= List of hospitals in Scotland =

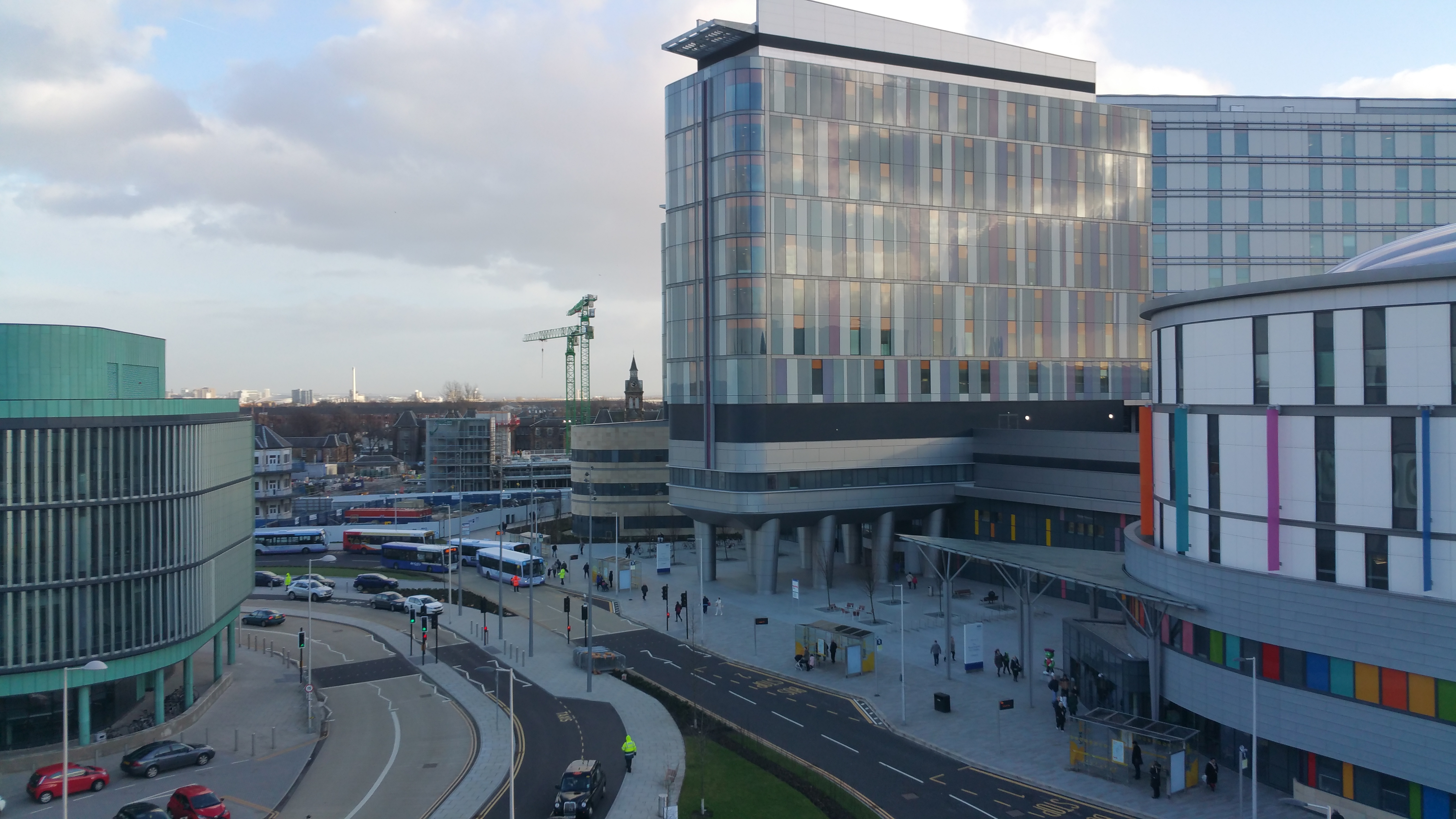
Queen Elizabeth University Hospital in Glasgow, one of the largest acute hospital campuses in Europe.

The following is a list of acute, general district, and mental health hospitals currently open and operational in Scotland, organised into each of the 14 regional health boards of NHS Scotland. Private hospitals that are not under the operational overview of NHS Scotland are also included.

== NHS hospitals in Scotland ==
Organised by NHS board areas, see NHS National Services Scotland and Subdivisions of Scotland.

=== Ayrshire and Arran ===
East Ayrshire, North Ayrshire and South Ayrshire

==== East Ayrshire ====
- East Ayrshire Community Hospital, Cumnock
- University Hospital Crosshouse, Crosshouse, Kilmarnock

==== North Ayrshire ====
- Arran War Memorial Hospital, Lamlash, Isle of Arran
- Ayrshire Central Hospital, Irvine
- Brooksby House Hospital, Largs
- Lady Margaret Hospital, Millport, Isle of Cumbrae
- Woodland View, Irvine

==== South Ayrshire ====
- Ailsa Hospital, Ayr
- Biggart Hospital, Prestwick
- Girvan Community Hospital, Girvan
- University Hospital Ayr

=== Borders ===
- Borders General Hospital, Melrose
- Hawick Community Hospital, Hawick
- Hay Lodge Hospital, Peebles
- Kelso Hospital, Kelso
- Knoll Hospital, Duns

=== Dumfries and Galloway ===
==== Within Dumfries ====
- Dumfries and Galloway Royal Infirmary
- Midpark Hospital

==== Outwith Dumfries ====
- Annan Hospital, Annan
- Castle Douglas Hospital, Castle Douglas
- Galloway Community Hospital, Stranraer
- Kirkcudbright Hospital, Kirkcudbright
- Lochmaben Hospital, Lochmaben
- Moffat Hospital, Moffat
- Newton Stewart Hospital, Newton Stewart
- Thomas Hope Hospital, Langholm
- Thornhill Hospital, Thornhill

=== Fife ===
- Adamson Hospital, Cupar
- Cameron Hospital, Windygates
- Glenrothes Hospital, Glenrothes
- Lynebank Hospital, Dunfermline
- Queen Margaret Hospital, Dunfermline
- Randolph Wemyss Memorial Hospital, Buckhaven
- St Andrews Community Hospital, St Andrews
- Stratheden Hospital, Springfield (Cupar)
- Victoria Hospital, Kirkcaldy
- Whyteman's Brae Hospital, Kirkcaldy

=== Forth Valley ===
Clackmannanshire, Falkirk and Stirling

==== Falkirk ====
===== Within Falkirk =====
- Falkirk Community Hospital

===== Outwith Falkirk =====
- Bo'ness Hospital, Bo'ness
- Forth Valley Royal Hospital, Larbert

==== Stirling ====
- Stirling Health and Care Village

=== Grampian ===
Aberdeenshire, Aberdeen City and Moray

==== Aberdeen City ====
- Aberdeen Health Village
- Aberdeen Maternity Hospital
- Aberdeen Royal Infirmary
- City Hospital
- Roxburghe House
- Royal Aberdeen Children's Hospital
- Royal Cornhill Hospital
- Woodend Hospital

==== Aberdeenshire ====
- Aboyne Hospital
- Chalmers Hospital, Banff
- Fraserburgh Hospital
- Glen o' Dee Hospital, Banchory
- Insch War Memorial Hospital
- Inverurie Hospital
- Jubilee Hospital, Huntly
- Kincardine Community Hospital, Stonehaven
- Peterhead Community Hospital
- Turriff Hospital
- Ugie Hospital, Peterhead

==== Moray ====
- Dr Gray's Hospital, Elgin
- Fleming Cottage Hospital, Aberlour
- Seafield Hospital, Buckie
- Stephen Cottage Hospital, Dufftown
- The Oaks, Elgin
- Turner Memorial Hospital, Keith

=== Greater Glasgow and Clyde ===
Argyll and Bute, Inverclyde, Glasgow City, East Dunbartonshire, West Dunbartonshire, Renfrewshire, and East Renfrewshire. Together with parts of South Lanarkshire and North Lanarkshire.

==== Inverclyde ====
- Inverclyde Royal Hospital, Greenock

==== Glasgow City ====
- Beatson West of Scotland Cancer Centre
- Gartnavel General Hospital
- Gartnavel Royal Hospital
- Glasgow Dental Hospital and School
- Glasgow Royal Infirmary
- Leverndale Hospital
- Lightburn Hospital
- NHS Centre for Integrative Care
- Princess Royal Maternity Hospital
- Royal Hospital for Children, Glasgow
- Stobhill Hospital
- New Victoria Hospital
- Queen Elizabeth University Hospital

==== West Dunbartonshire ====
- Dumbarton Joint Hospital
- Vale of Leven Hospital, Alexandria

==== Renfrewshire ====
- Dykebar Hospital, Paisley
- Royal Alexandra Hospital, Paisley

=== Highland ===
==== Argyll and Bute ====
- Argyll and Bute Hospital, Lochgilphead
- Campbeltown Hospital, Campbeltown
- Cowal Community Hospital
- Islay Hospital, Bowmore, Isle of Islay
- Lorn and Islands Hospital, Oban
- Mid Argyll Community Hospital, Lochgilphead
- Mull and Iona Community Hospital, Isle of Mull
- Victoria Hospital, Rothesay
- Victoria Integrated Care Centre, Helensburgh

==== Badenoch and Strathspey ====
- Ian Charles Community Hospital, Grantown-on-Spey
- St Vincent's Hospital, Kingussie

==== Caithness ====
- Caithness General Hospital, Wick
- Dunbar Hospital, Thurso
- Wick Town and County Hospital, Wick

==== Inverness ====
- New Craigs Psychiatric Hospital, Inverness
- Raigmore Hospital, Inverness
- RNI Community Hospital, Inverness

==== Lochaber ====
- Belford Hospital, Fort William

==== Nairnshire ====
- Nairn Town and County Hospital, Nairn

==== Ross-shire ====
- County Community Hospital, Invergordon
- Ross Memorial Hospital, Dingwall

==== Skye ====
- Mackinnon Memorial Hospital, Broadford, Isle of Skye
- Portree Hospital, Isle of Skye

==== Sutherland ====
- Lawson Memorial Hospital, Golspie
- Migdale Hospital, Bonar Bridge

=== Lanarkshire ===
The majority of North Lanarkshire and South Lanarkshire

==== North Lanarkshire ====
- Cleland Hospital, Cleland
- Coathill Hospital, Coatbridge
- Kilsyth Victoria Cottage Hospital, Kilsyth
- University Hospital Monklands, Airdrie
- University Hospital Wishaw, Wishaw
- Wester Moffat Hospital, Airdrie

==== South Lanarkshire ====
- Kello Hospital, Biggar
- Kirklands Hospital, Bothwell
- Lady Home Hospital, Douglas
- Stonehouse Hospital
- Udston Hospital, Hamilton
- University Hospital Hairmyres, East Kilbride

=== Lothian ===
City of Edinburgh, East Lothian, Midlothian and West Lothian

==== City of Edinburgh ====
- Astley Ainslie Hospital, Edinburgh
- Chalmers Hospital, Edinburgh
- Corstorphine Hospital
- Edinburgh Dental Institute
- Ellen's Glen House
- Lauriston Building
- Leith Community Treatment Centre
- Liberton Hospital
- Princess Alexandra Eye Pavilion
- Royal Edinburgh Hospital
- Royal Hospital for Children and Young People (Edinburgh)
- Royal Infirmary of Edinburgh at Little France
- Royal Victoria Hospital (Edinburgh)
- Western General Hospital

==== East Lothian ====
- Belhaven Hospital, Dunbar
- Edington Cottage Hospital, North Berwick
- East Lothian Community Hospital, Haddington

==== Midlothian ====
- Midlothian Community Hospital

==== West Lothian ====
- St John's Hospital, Livingston
- St Michael's Hospital, Linlithgow
- Tippethill House Hospital, Whitburn

=== Orkney ===
- Balfour Hospital, Kirkwall

=== Shetland ===
- Gilbert Bain Hospital, Lerwick
- Montfield Hospital, Lerwick

=== Tayside ===
Angus, Dundee City and Perth and Kinross

==== Angus ====
- Arbroath Infirmary
- Stracathro Hospital, Brechin
- Whitehills Hospital, Forfar

==== Dundee City ====
===== Within Dundee =====
- Carseview Centre
- Dundee Dental Hospital
- King's Cross Hospital
- Ninewells Hospital
- Royal Victoria Hospital
- Tayside Children's Hospital

==== Perth and Kinross ====
===== Within Perth =====
- Murray Royal Hospital
- Perth Royal Infirmary

===== Outwith Perth =====
- Blairgowrie Community Hospital
- Crieff Community Hospital
- Pitlochry Community Hospital
- St Margaret's Hospital, Auchterarder

=== Western Isles ===
- St Brendan's Hospital, Castlebay, Isle of Barra
- Uist and Barra Hospital, Balivanich, Isle of Benbecula
- Western Isles Hospital, Stornoway, Isle of Lewis

=== Others ===
The following NHS hospitals are classed as Special NHS Boards, and serve the whole of Scotland.

==== South Lanarkshire ====
- State Hospital, Carstairs

==== West Dunbartonshire ====
- Golden Jubilee University National Hospital, Clydebank

== Private hospitals in Scotland ==
=== General Hospitals ===
- Albyn Hospital, Aberdeen
- Carrick Glen Hospital, Ayr, South Ayrshire
- Fernbrae Hospital, Dundee
- Kings Park Hospital, Stirling
- Murrayfield Hospital, Edinburgh
- Nuffield Health Glasgow Hospital, Glasgow
- Nuffield Health Edinburgh Hospital, Edinburgh
- Ross Hall Hospital, Glasgow
- Boye Hall Clinic, Edinburgh

=== Psychiatric Hospitals ===
- Alexander Clinic, Oldmeldrum, Aberdeenshire
- Castle Craig Hospital, Peebles
- Graham Anderson House, Glasgow
- Huntercombe Hospital – Edinburgh, Uphall, West Lothian
- Monroe House, Dundee
- Partnerships in Care Ayr Clinic, Ayr
- Priory Hospital Glasgow, Glasgow
- Surehaven Glasgow Hospital, Glasgow

=== Other Specialist Services ===
- Murdostoun Castle, Wishaw specialises in the rehabilitation of patients with acquired brain injury.
- Scottish Epilepsy Centre, Glasgow specialises in the treatment of epilepsy, epilepsy associated conditions and sleep disorders.
- Vision Scotland, Glasgow, Edinburgh, Aberdeen specialised eye surgery centres.
