= Highland Hospital Radio =

Coordinates: 57.4736°N 4.1930°W

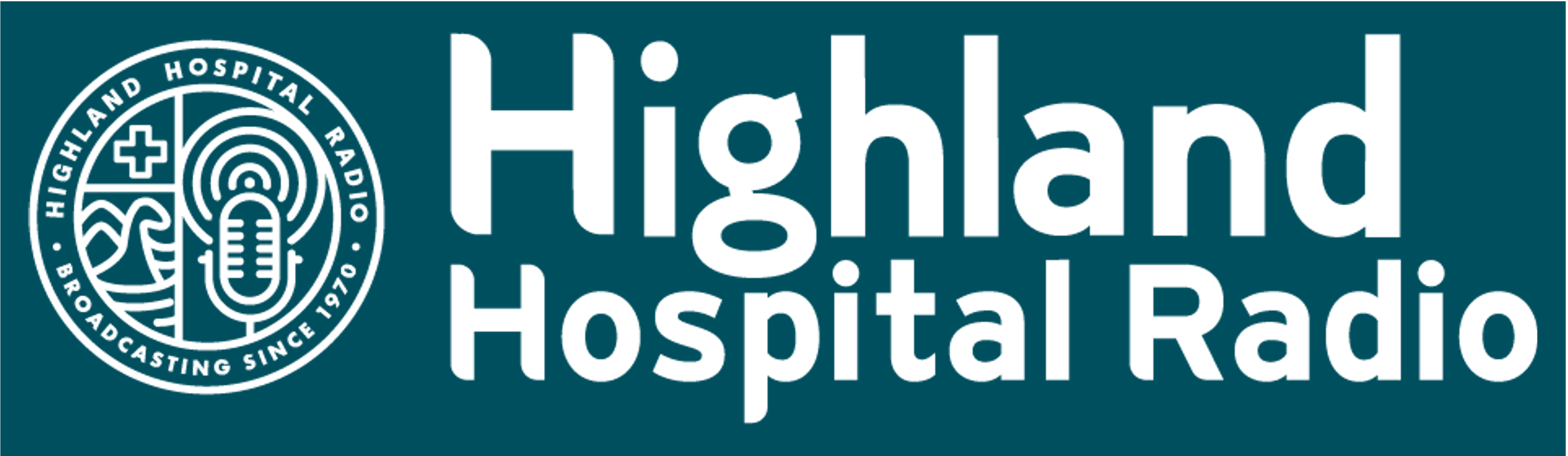
- Scotland
- Broadcast area: NHS Highland

Programming
- Format: Hospital Radio

Ownership
- Owner: Registered Charity

History
- First air date: 2 November 1970
- Former names: Inverness Hospital Radio, Radio Inverness

Links
- Website: hhr.scot

Highland Hospital Radio is a volunteer-run hospital radio service based with purpose-built studios at Raigmore Hospital in Inverness, Scotland. The station broadcasts 7 days a week and welcomes requests and dedications for patients. The station has been in service since 1970. The station received the Queen's Award for Voluntary Service in 2012.

Highland Hospital Radio is the working name for Inverness Hospitals Broadcasting Service SCIO (Registered Scottish Charity SC052323).

== History ==
The station first went on air on 2 November 1970 with a pre-recorded show broadcast to the patients in the RNI and Raigmore Hospital. A small room in the RNI became the first studio of Radio Inverness in 1975. Since 22 August 1979 they have been a registered charity.

The station moved to a brand new studio in Raigmore Hospital in 1998 and began using the name Inverness Hospital Radio.

The service launched an online streaming service on 2 November 2021 as part of the 50th anniversary celebrations of the station. This date was in fact the 51st anniversary as the original plans were delayed due to the COVID-19 pandemic. The stream is available free via the website or various internet radio systems.

== Programming ==
The station broadcasts 24 hours a day 7 days a week. Highland Hospital Radio produces over 25 hours of original content every week. The main crux of this is during the evenings from 7pm to 10pm which incorporate the main live request show at 8pm each night. A Saturday day time magazine programme 'The Saturday Drop In' offers a day time request service, and welcome guests in to the studio from the NHS Highland area from charities and other organisations who aims are Health and Well Being, with a specific focus on good mental health.

The station genre tends to centre around Middle of the road (music) but there is a focus on traditional Scottish music every day at 1pm. The weekday day time schedule makes use of replayed live evening shows and Decade and Genre specific music programming.

The station schedule is mainly filled with music entertainment programmes but also has special features focusing on health and well being in collaboration with NHS Highland and local health based charities. The station also carries Public Service Announcements on behalf of local and Scottish Government.

== Awards ==
In 2012 the station received the Queen's Award for Voluntary Service.

Donnie Aird, one of the founders who has been involved throughout the station's 40-year history, was presented with The John Whitney Award at the 2014 Hospital Broadcasting Association awards. This award recognises outstanding contributions to Hospital Radio over a period of years.
