= Snecked masonry =

Stone laying technique using stones of varying size

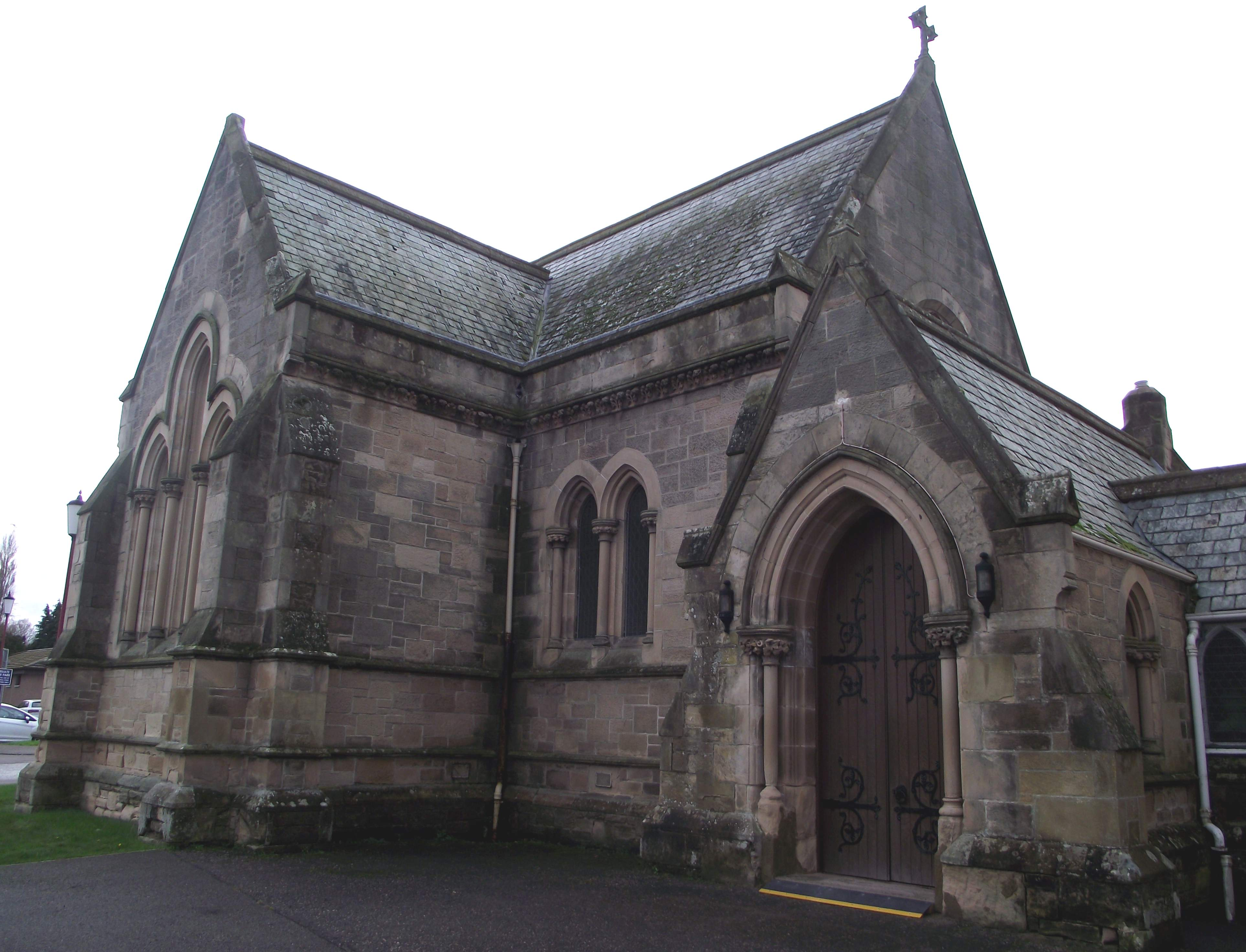
Snecked masonry in the walls of Tweedmouth Memorial Chapel at the Royal Northern Infirmary, Inverness, Scotland

Snecked masonry is a stone laying technique which mixes squared ashlar stones of varying size laid in interrupted horizontal courses. A typical mix has squares, large rectangles, flat rectangles, and smaller fillers called "snecks". The random combination of sizes produces a strong bond and an attractive finish. Both smooth-faced and rusticated finishes are found, as well as dry stone and mortared walls. Even with dressed stone, snecked masonry may require on-site stone cutting and shaping.
