= Rural general hospital =

A rural general hospital is a small hospital, similar to a district general hospital, but is specifically trained and staffed to provide healthcare services in remote and rural areas. The concept was pioneered by NHS Scotland.

== Access to services ==
The rural general hospitals are all to be found in the Scottish Highlands and Islands in areas which generally have a small or scattered populations who would otherwise face a long or difficult journey to get to larger settlements.

The rural general hospital model aims to overcome some of the practical difficulties associated with delivering services to the people living in these areas.

== Framework ==
Rural general hospitals provide consultant-led general surgical services and examples of the type of planned operations that patients can have include gall bladder surgery and endoscopy. Certain specialist procedures can be performed at rural general hospitals by visiting surgeons. Some specialist staff may travel between rural general hospitals. Rural general hospitals are equipped and staffed to be able to resuscitate, stabilise and prepare patients who might require emergency surgery. Some emergency surgery can be carried out in the rural general hospital- surgery to remove an appendix or resolve an abdominal problem, for example.

Many have consultant-led general medical services also. A few hospitals have medical services provided by hospital practitioners, who are general practitioners with extra training.

All the rural general hospitals have maternity services, generally provided by general practitioners and midwives, although some have Consultant-led services. Rural general hospitals that are located on islands are also equipped and staffed to be able to carry out caesarean sections.

Map showing the locations of rural general hospitals in Scotland

== Recognition and support ==
The Scottish Government accepted the recommendations of the Remote and Rural Steering Group's report and since 2008 have recognised 6 rural general hospitals:

- Balfour Hospital, Kirkwall, Orkney - run by NHS Orkney
- Belford Hospital, Fort William, Lochaber - run by NHS Highland
- Caithness General Hospital, Wick, Caithness - run by NHS Highland
- Gilbert Bain Hospital, Lerwick, Shetland - run by NHS Shetland
- Western Isles Hospital, Stornoway, Isle of Lewis - run by NHS Western Isles
- Lorn and Islands Hospital, Oban, Argyll

Originally about £1.5 million of funding was allocated to support this framework.

== Other rural hospital models of care ==
There are some other hospitals that face similar challenges, but that have employed different models to deliver care to rural communities:

- Dr Gray's Hospital, Elgin, Moray
- Mackinnon Memorial Hospital, Broadford, Isle of Skye - run by NHS Highland
