= Ugie Hospital =

- NHS Grampian
- Shown in Aberdeenshire

Geography
- Location: Peterhead, Aberdeenshire, Scotland, United Kingdom
- Coordinates: 57°30′55″N 1°47′32″W

Organisation
- Care system: NHS Scotland
- Type: Psychogeriatric

Services
- Emergency department: No Accident & Emergency

History
- Founded: 1905

Links
- Website: Official website
- Lists: Hospitals in Scotland

Ugie Hospital is a small hospital in Peterhead, Scotland, providing psychogeriatric services. It is managed by NHS Grampian.

== History ==
The foundation stone for the facility was laid in June 1905. It first opened as the local infectious diseases hospital in 1907.

In 2004, the Ravenscraig geriatric ward at the hospital was closed to new admissions because of an outbreak of MRSA among the elderly patients. Eight of the 13 patients were found to be carriers of the bacteria, although none of the patients was actually infected.

In August 2005 Aberdeenshire Community Health Partnership issued a consultation document on Older People's Services, Maternity Services and Diagnostic and Treatment Services, one of which would have allowed "the relocation of all psychogeriatric services out of Ugie Hospital and enable it to be closed".

After certain services transferred to Fraserburgh Hospital, the Buchanhaven Ward at Ugie Hospital was closed in May 2011.
