= Highland Clinical Research Facility =

The Highland Clinical Research Facility (HCRF) supports clinical research in the Highlands of Scotland. It was opened in 2009, and is a purpose-built facility housed within the Centre for Health Science, adjacent to Raigmore Hospital in Inverness.
