= Nairn Town and County Hospital =

- NHS Highland
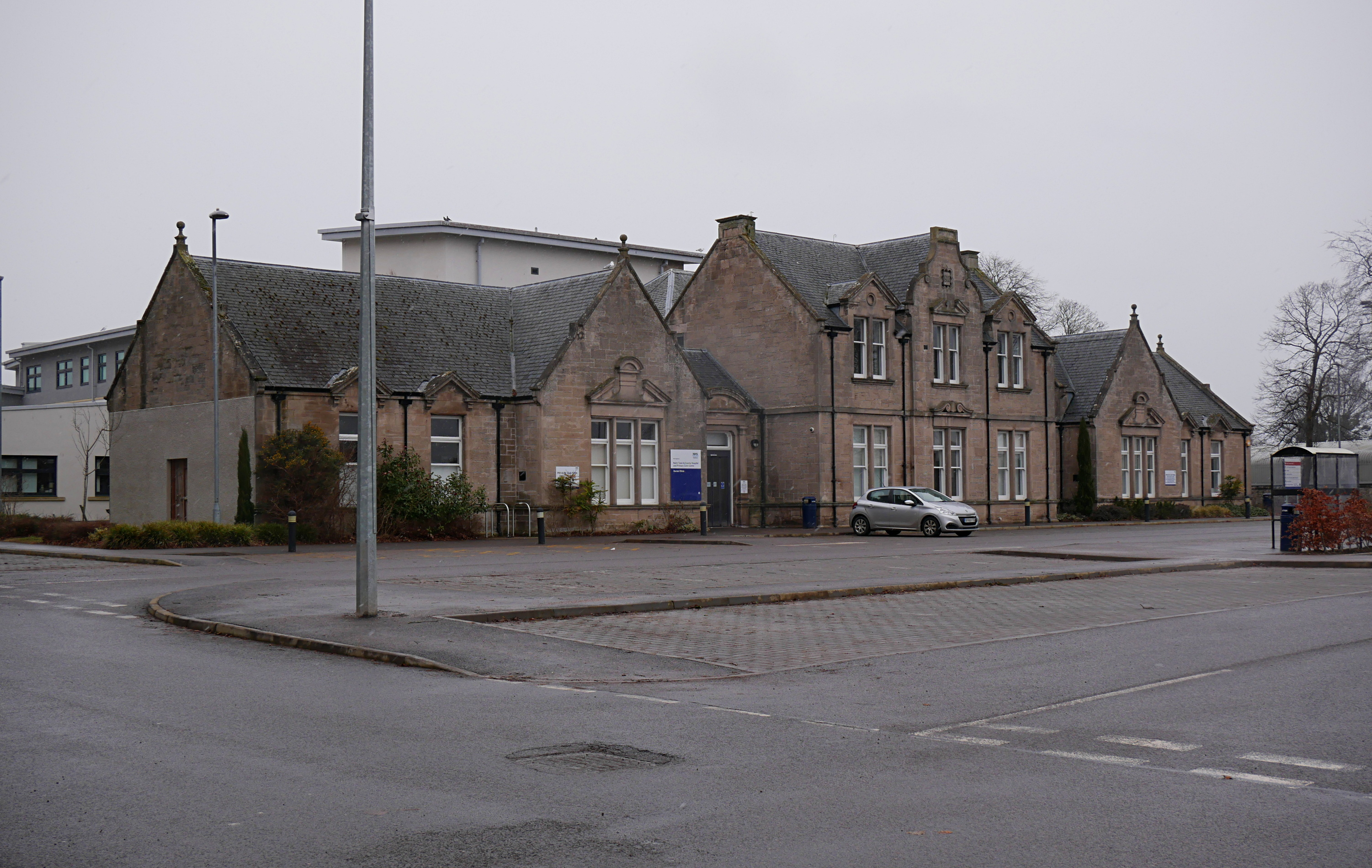
- Nairn Town and County Hospital

- Shown in Nairnshire

Geography
- Location: Nairn, Highland, Scotland, United Kingdom
- Coordinates: 57.578208°N 3.872834°W

Organisation
- Care system: NHS Scotland
- Type: Community hospital

Services
- Emergency department: No Accident & Emergency
- Beds: 19

History
- Founded: 1906

Links
- Website: www.nhshighland.scot.nhs.uk/Services/Pages/NairnTownandCountyHospital.aspx
- Lists: Hospitals in Scotland

Nairn Town and County Hospital and Primary Care Centre, also known as the Town and County Hospital, is a healthcare facility located in Nairn, Scotland. It serves a population of around 14,000 people living in the Nairn and Ardersier area and is managed by NHS Highland.

== History ==
The hospital has its origins as a fever hospital designed by Thomas Mackenzie which was completed on Lodgehill Road in 1846.

A new purpose-built facility, designed by William Mackintosh of Inverness, was built on Cawdor Road between 1904 and 1906 and became known as the Town and County Hospital.

In the early 21st century it was decided to redevelop the site to create modern healthcare facilities. The works, which were carried out by Morrison Construction at a cost of £12 million, commenced in 2008. The works were completed in several phases and involved the creation of a new community hospital, a new primary care centre and the conversion of the old Edwardian Hospital into five dental surgeries. The centre was officially opened by the Chief Executive of NHS Scotland, Dr Kevin Woods, in September 2012.

== Integrated services ==
The facility incorporates a community hospital and primary care centre. The 19 community hospital beds are used for the care of patients who require more intensive medical input than can be provided in their own home, but who do not require to be admitted to the District General Hospital located in Inverness. The primary care centre has 22 consultation and treatment rooms, including a dedicated minor surgery suite and ultrasound room.

The Nuffield Trust and King’s Fund observed that this facility has a configuration that allows it to operate as an integrated primary, community and social care services centre within which the merged GP partnership is based. Alex Neil, Cabinet Secretary for Health and Wellbeing visited the facility in June 2014 to see the benefits arising from having these integrated health and social care arrangements available to patients.
