= Victoria Integrated Care Centre, Helensburgh =

Victoria Integrated Care Centre
- NHS Highland
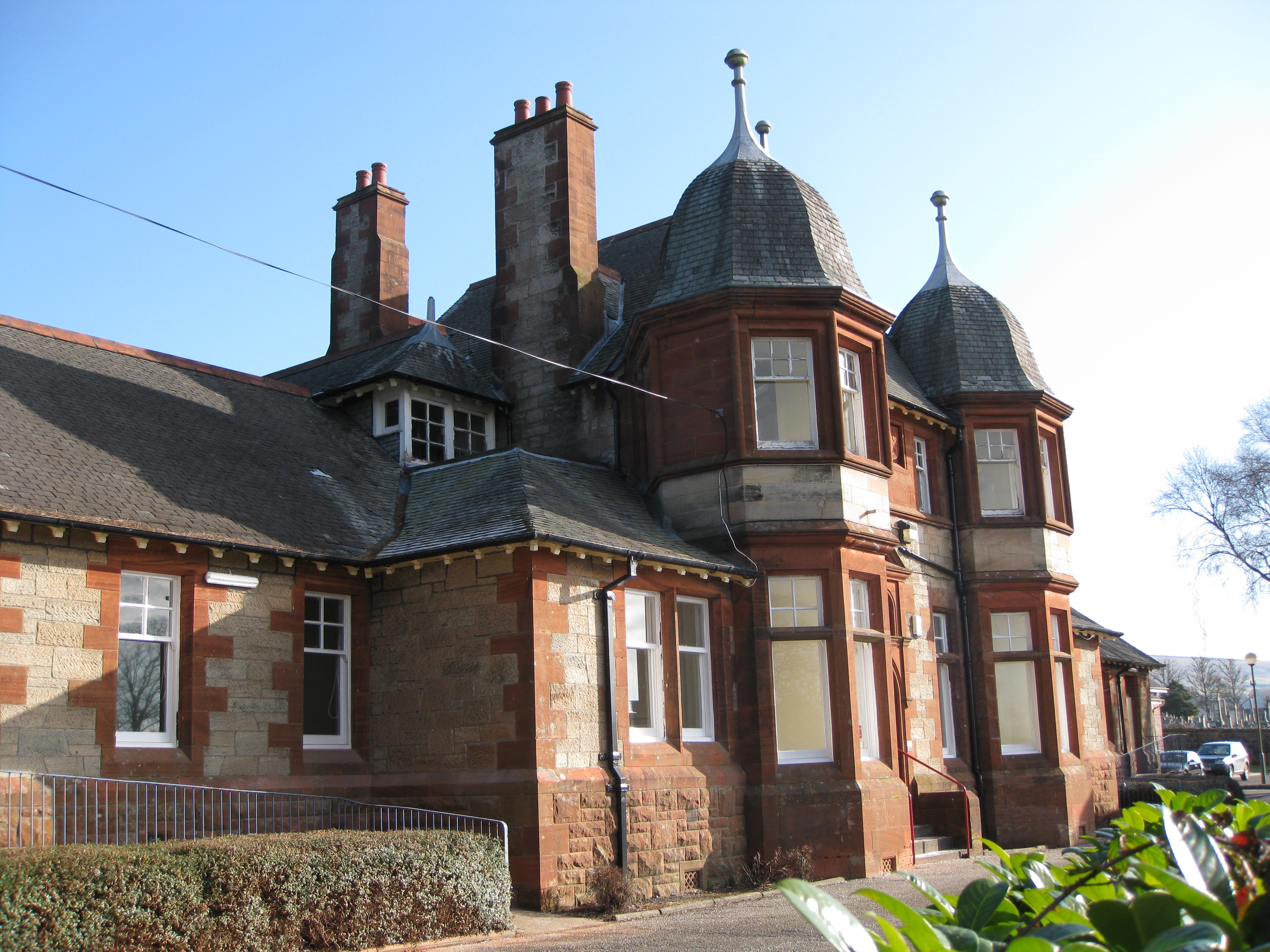
- The Victoria Infirmary Building

- Shown in Argyll and Bute

Geography
- Location: Helensburgh, Scotland
- Coordinates: 56.0028°N 4.7152°W

Organisation
- Care system: NHS Scotland
- Type: Integrated Care Centre

History
- Founded: 1876

Links
- Website: website
- Lists: Hospitals in Scotland

The Victoria Integrated Care Centre is a health facility in Helensburgh, Scotland. It is managed by NHS Highland.

== History ==
The facility has its origins in the Helensburgh Hospital which was financed by a legacy from Anne Alexander and which opened as a hospital for both infectious and non-infectious diseases in 1876. A new hospital, designed by William Leiper and intended to deal purely with non-infectious cases, opened on a near-by site in September 1895. It became the Victoria Infirmary to commemorate Queen Victoria's Diamond Jubilee in 1897. The hospital joined the National Health Service in 1948 and an extension providing new physiotherapy, X-ray and out-patient facilities opened in 1951.

The Jeanie Deans Unit, which was built to the south of the infirmary building, received a visit by the Princess Royal in 1998. It was redeveloped as a modern integrated care centre in 2009.

== Services ==
The site comprises the Victoria Infirmary Building, the Jeanie Deans Centre, the Community Base and the Out-Patient Department. The Victoria Infirmary Building is now little used. The Jeanie Deans Centre now provides a base for outreach Mental Health Services including consultants/CPNs and clinical psychology. In addition, there are out-patient facilities for Chiropody. The former nurses' home has been converted into a base for community staff working within the area including nurse, community paediatric and administrative staff. The Out-Patient Department provides facilities for a number of visiting consultants together with X-ray, physiotherapy and dental departments.
