= Portree Hospital =

Health facility in Portree

- NHS Highland
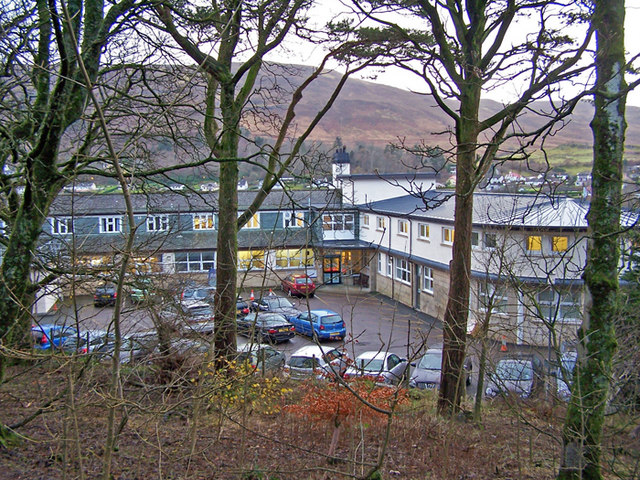
- Portree Hospital

- Shown on the Isle of Skye

Geography
- Location: Fancyhill, Portree, Isle of Skye, Scotland
- Coordinates: 57.41049°N 6.1933°W

Organisation
- Care system: NHS Scotland
- Type: General

History
- Founded: 1964

Links
- Lists: Hospitals in Scotland

The Portree Hospital is a health facility in Fancyhill, Portree on the Isle of Skye. It is managed by NHS Highland.

== History ==
The facility, which was commissioned to replace the old Ross Memorial Hospital in Portree, opened in 1964. An outpatients department was added in 1965 and the whole hospital was enlarged by adding an extra storey in 2007. A report prepared by Sir Lewis Ritchie, published in May 2018, recommended that the hospital continue to offer inpatient services and out-of-hours care.
