= Lawson Memorial Hospital =

- NHS Highland
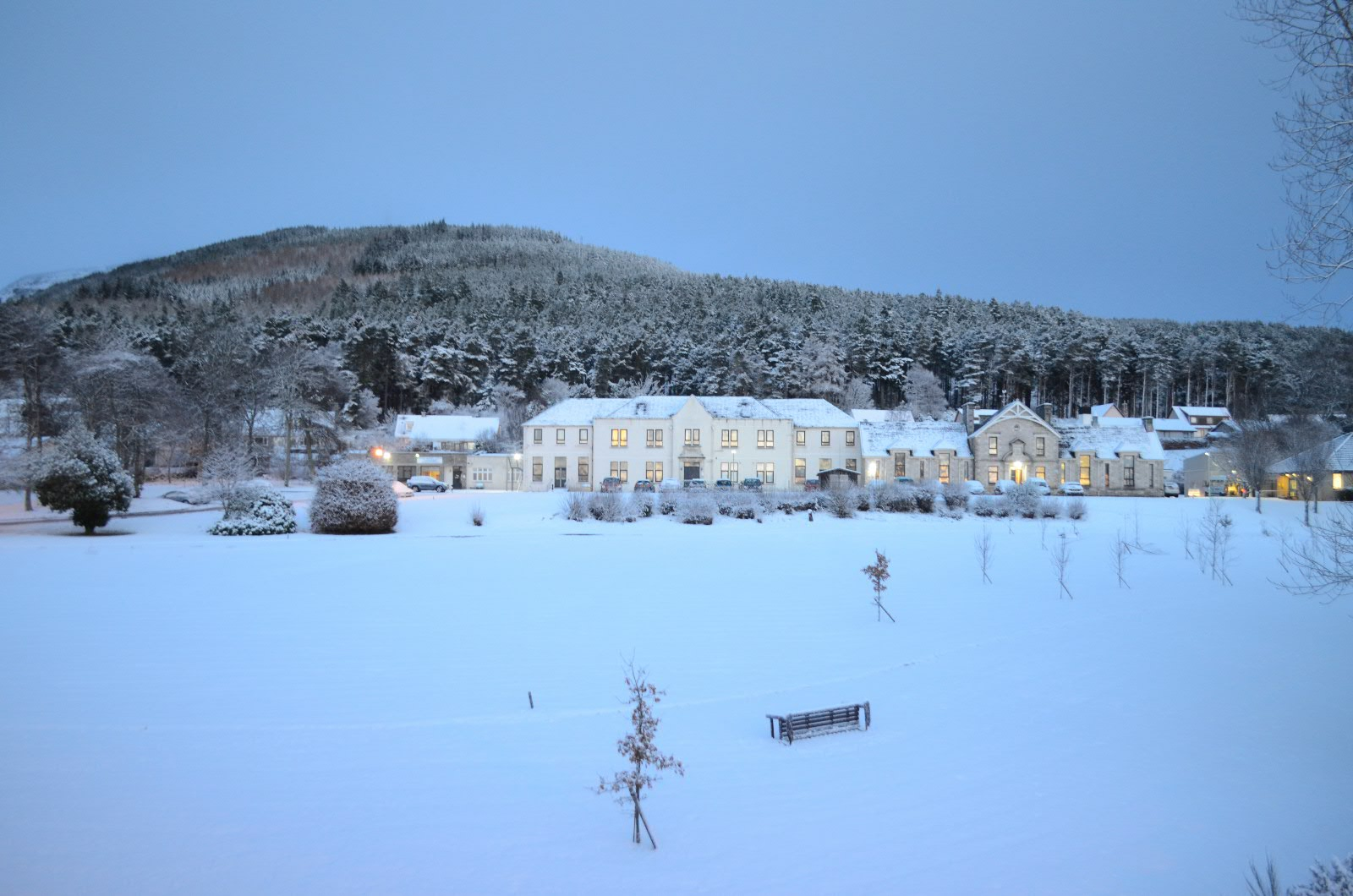
- Lawson Memorial Hospital

- Shown in Sutherland

Geography
- Location: Station Road, Golspie, Sutherland KW10 6SS, Scotland
- Coordinates: 57.9730°N 3.9883°W

Organisation
- Care system: NHS Scotland
- Type: General

History
- Founded: 1899

Links
- Lists: Hospitals in Scotland

The Lawson Memorial Hospital is a health facility in Ben Bhraggie Terrace, Golspie, Scotland. It is managed by NHS Highland.

== History ==
The facility, which was designed by John Hinton Gall, was built as a memorial to Alexander Brown Lawson and opened in 1899. An extra wing, known as the Cambusavie Wing, was added in 1935 and, after the hospital had joined the National Health Service in 1948, further extensions were completed in the 1970s and in 1989. John Lennon, the musician, and Yoko Ono and their children were treated in the hospital after a road traffic accident in 1969.
