= Mackinnon Memorial Hospital =

- NHS Highland
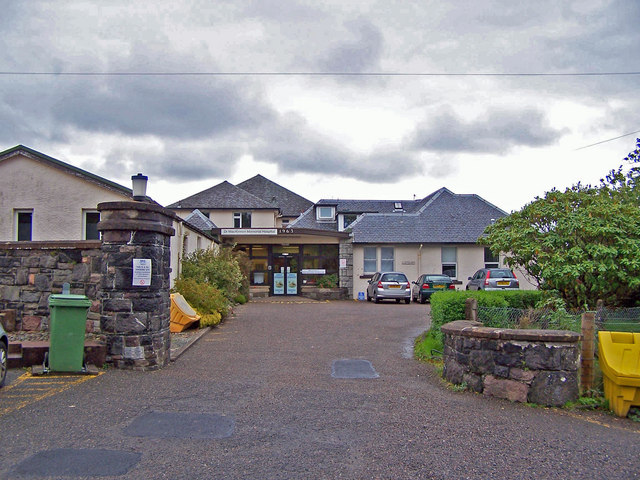
- Entrance to Mackinnon Memorial Hospital

- Shown on the Isle of Skye

Geography
- Location: Broadford, Isle of Skye, Scotland
- Coordinates: 57°14′48″N 5°54′39″W

Organisation
- Care system: NHS Scotland
- Type: Rural General Hospital

Services
- Beds: 23

Links
- Website: Website
- Lists: Hospitals in Scotland

The former Mackinnon Memorial Hospital building is now vacant; it sits adjacent to the new Broadford Hospital, all services having moved into this new purpose built building in March 2022. It was a community hospital, located in the village of Broadford on the Isle of Skye. It was managed by NHS Highland.

== History ==
The hospital was commissioned as voluntary hospital commemorating the work of the Reverend Donald Mackinnon, the former parish priest, who died in 1888. It was designed by W L Carruthers & Alexander and opened in September 1914. A substantial renovation and expansion was completed in 1963.

The hospital established a reputation for rural surgical care, with an important role played by general surgeon John Ball, who spent his entire consultant career in Broadford, retiring in 1999.

== Services ==
The hospital had 25 in-patient beds and 24-hour on site medical and nursing cover. The hospital provides a 24-hour Accident and Emergency service. It has a single resuscitation room which is normally used for assessment of patients presenting to the hospital with trauma or acute illness (i.e. as they would to a normal Emergency Department). Patients may self-present, may be referred in by their primary care doctor or may be brought in by the ambulance services (again, as with a normal Emergency Department). There is an x-ray machine with a radiographer on-call 24 hours a day, and various near-patient testing devices available are used in lieu of laboratory tests (formal laboratory tests are undertaken by sending samples to Raigmore Hospital in Inverness for analysis and as such are not available in a timely manner). Telemedicine is utilised at the site whereby practitioners are able to discuss cases and obtain specialist opinions on diagnosis and management in real time via videoconferencing with specialists based elsewhere in Scotland. Transfers of patients requiring emergency specialist or surgical management (e.g. those with acute appendicitis or acute STEMI) to secondary care hospitals such as Raigmore Hospital or tertiary units based in the larger hospitals in the central belt may be undertaken via ambulance or helicopter (depending on acuity and other considerations such as the weather and availability of resources).

There are a variety of other services based in the hospital at various times of the week, including a fracture clinic, minor surgery, medical day case (e.g. for patients to receive chemotherapy), midwifery and diagnostic ultrasound.

== Rural practitioners ==
The hospital has 10 medical staff who are designated rural practitioners, general practitioners who have had specialised training in trauma and anaesthetics. For air transfers, a local airfield is used, where fixed-wing aircraft can also land: the helipad at the hospital was closed in 2014 due to safety concerns.
