= Caithness General Hospital =

- NHS Highland
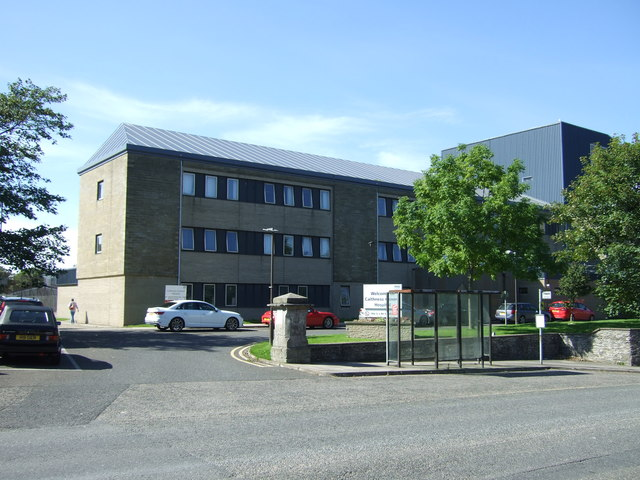
- Caithness General Hospital

- Shown in Caithness

Geography
- Location: Caithness, Highland, Scotland
- Coordinates: 58°26′29″N 3°5′39″W

Organisation
- Care system: NHS Scotland
- Type: Rural General

Services
- Emergency department: Yes
- Beds: 44

History
- Founded: 1986

Links
- Website: www.cgh.scot.nhs.uk

Caithness General Hospital is a rural general hospital operated by NHS Highland, located in Wick, Caithness, Scotland. It is managed by NHS Highland.

== History ==
The hospital became operational in 1986 to replace the previous Caithness Central Hospital. A new Day Case Unit was opened by Sam Galbraith in 1999. A CT scanner service was introduced in August 2008.

The hospital formerly had a consultant-led maternity unit, but stringent application of clinical risk assessment criteria meant that in 2012 and 2013 around 30% of pregnant women in the Caithness area needed to travel to Raigmore Hospital in Inverness to give birth. In November 2016 the NHS Highland board approved the introduction of a community midwifery unit.

== Services ==
=== Capacity ===
The hospital has the capacity to accommodate 44 inpatients: 20 acute assessment beds, 24 post-acute and rehabilitation beds. Its services include: 24-hour Accident & Emergency department, assessment and rehabilitation, general medicine, general surgery, community midwifery unit and palliative care.

=== Emergency surgical services ===
In December 2014 the health board announced that emergency surgical services would not be available at night or weekends from 15 December 2014, due to a lack of suitable consultant cover. A meeting between the health board and community leaders to discuss staff shortages was then scheduled for 6 January 2015.

=== Community midwife unit ===
In January 2017, the hospital completed the introduction of a midwife-led unit. As of 2015, there are an estimated 136 births a year at the hospital; it has full accreditation as baby friendly, since November 2009.

== Hospital radio ==
Radio Remedy is a volunteer-run radio station based at the hospital.
