= Campbeltown Hospital =

- NHS Highland
- Location within Argyll and Bute

Geography
- Location: Ralston Road, Campbeltown, Scotland
- Coordinates: 55.4212°N 5.6049°W

Organisation
- Care system: NHS Scotland
- Type: General

Services
- Emergency department: No

History
- Founded: 1896

Links
- Lists: Hospitals in Scotland

Campbeltown Hospital is a community hospital in Ralston Road, Campbeltown, Scotland. It is managed by NHS Highland.

== History ==
The facility has its origins in the Campbeltown Cottage Hospital which was opened on Witchburn Road in 1896. The hospital joined the National Health Service in 1948 but, after the cottage hospital became decrepit, services transferred a modern facility in Ralston Road in the early 1990s. The number of beds was reduced from over 60 beds at opening and from 19 to 15 in January 2019.
