= Mid Argyll Community Hospital =

- NHS Highland
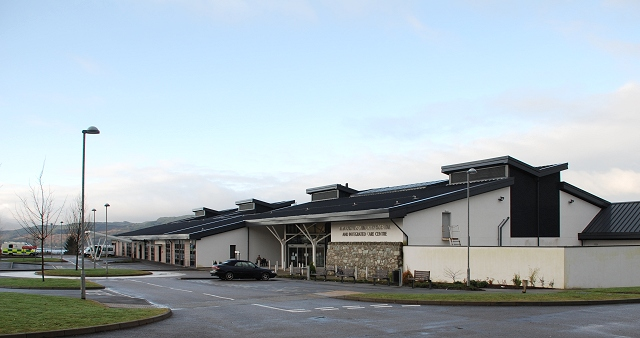
- Mid Argyll Community Hospital and Integrated Care Centre

- Location within Argyll and Bute

Geography
- Location: Blarbuie Road, Lochgilphead, Scotland
- Coordinates: 56.0402°N 5.4229°W

Organisation
- Care system: NHS Scotland
- Type: General

Services
- Emergency department: Yes

Helipads
- Helipad: Yes

History
- Founded: 1896

Links
- Lists: Hospitals in Scotland

Mid Argyll Community Hospital is a community hospital in Blarbuie Road, Lochgilphead, Scotland. It is managed by NHS Highland.

== History ==
The facility has its origins in an infectious diseases hospital, designed by Speirs & Co. and completed in 1897. The hospital joined the National Health Service in 1948. New facilities were procured under a Private Finance Initiative contract in 2004. The new building, which was designed by HLM Architects and built by Balfour Beatty at a cost of £19.2 million, opened in 2007.

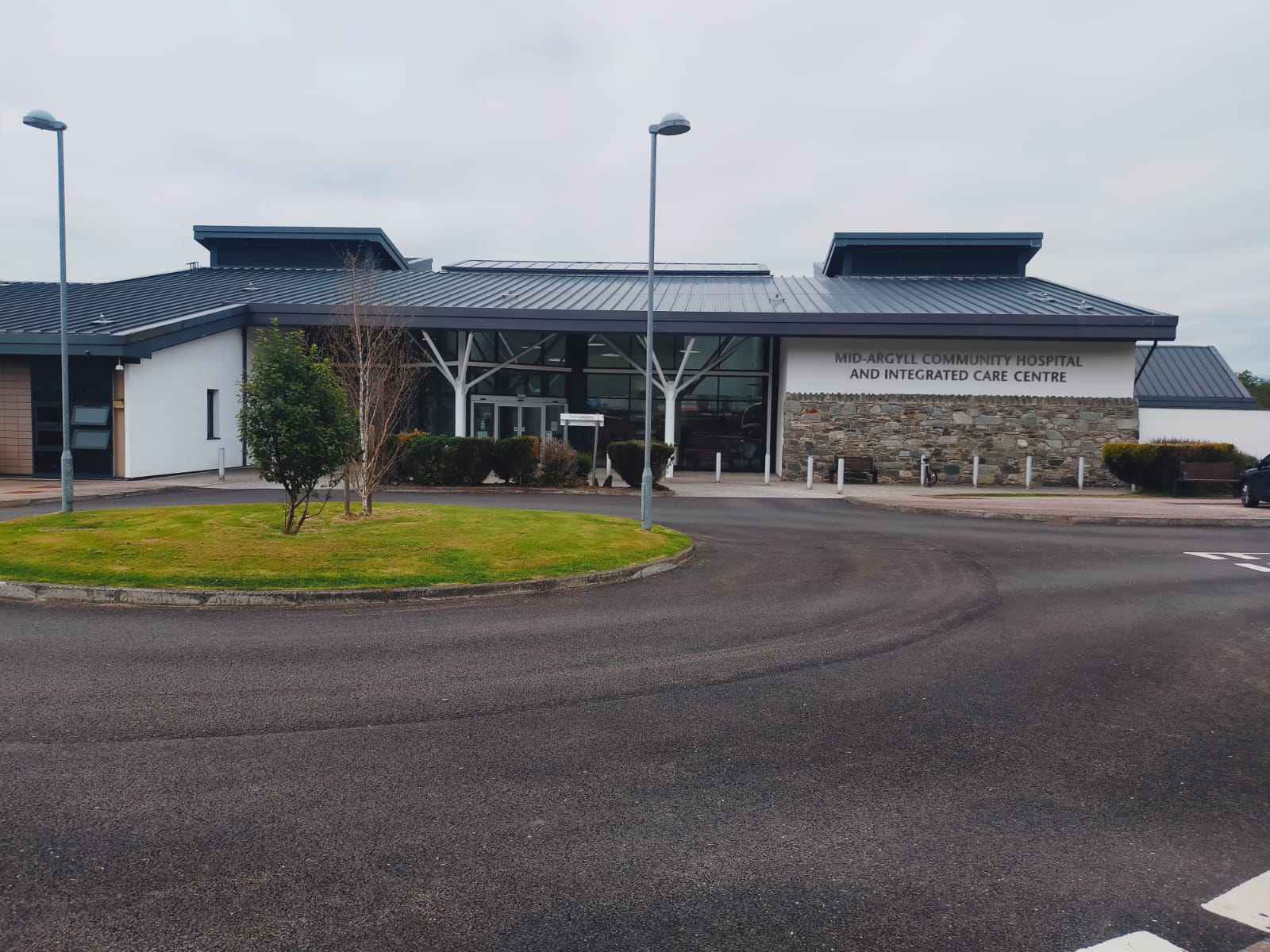
Mid Argyll Community Hospital

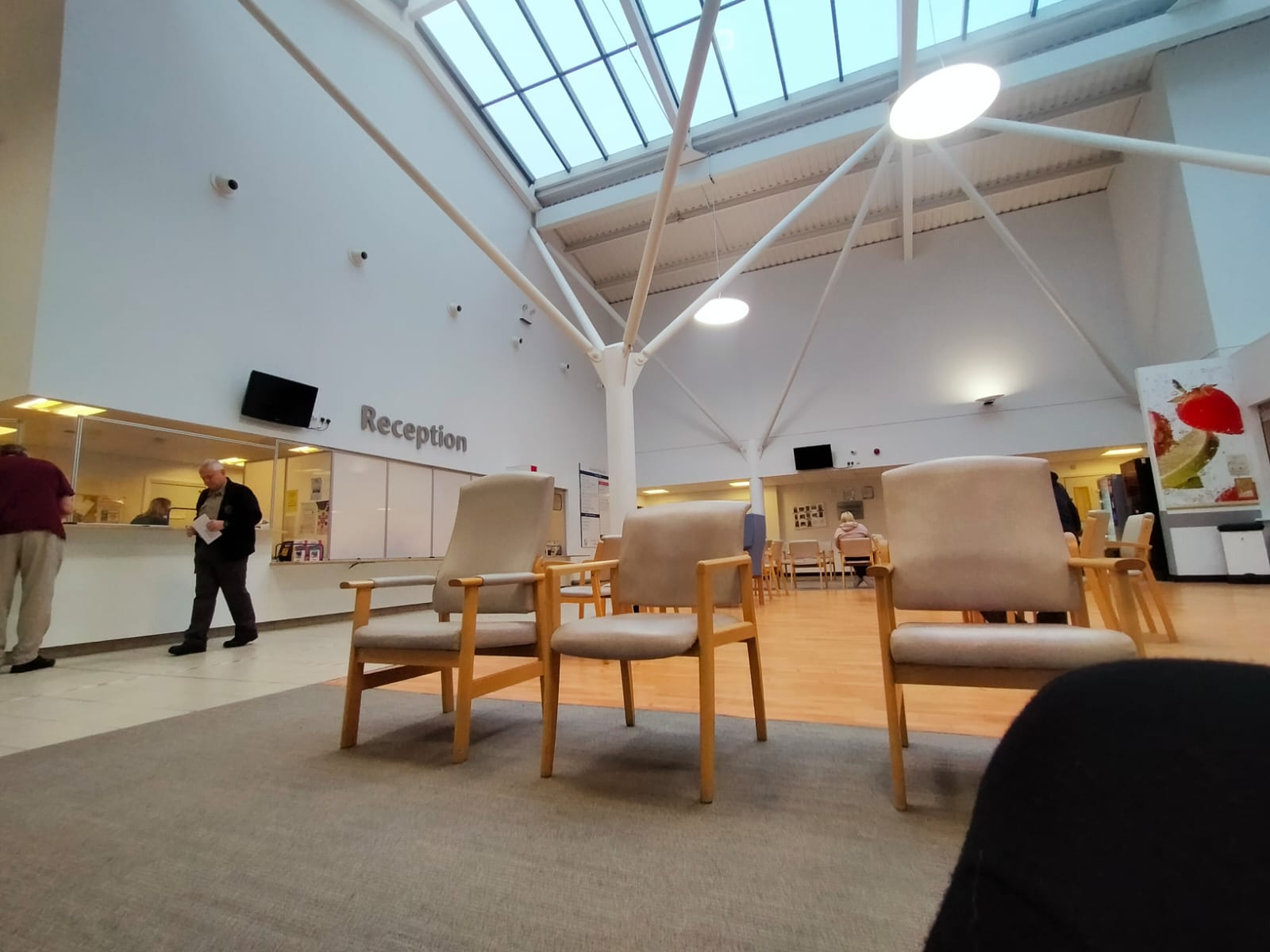
Mid Argyll Hospital Reception Hall

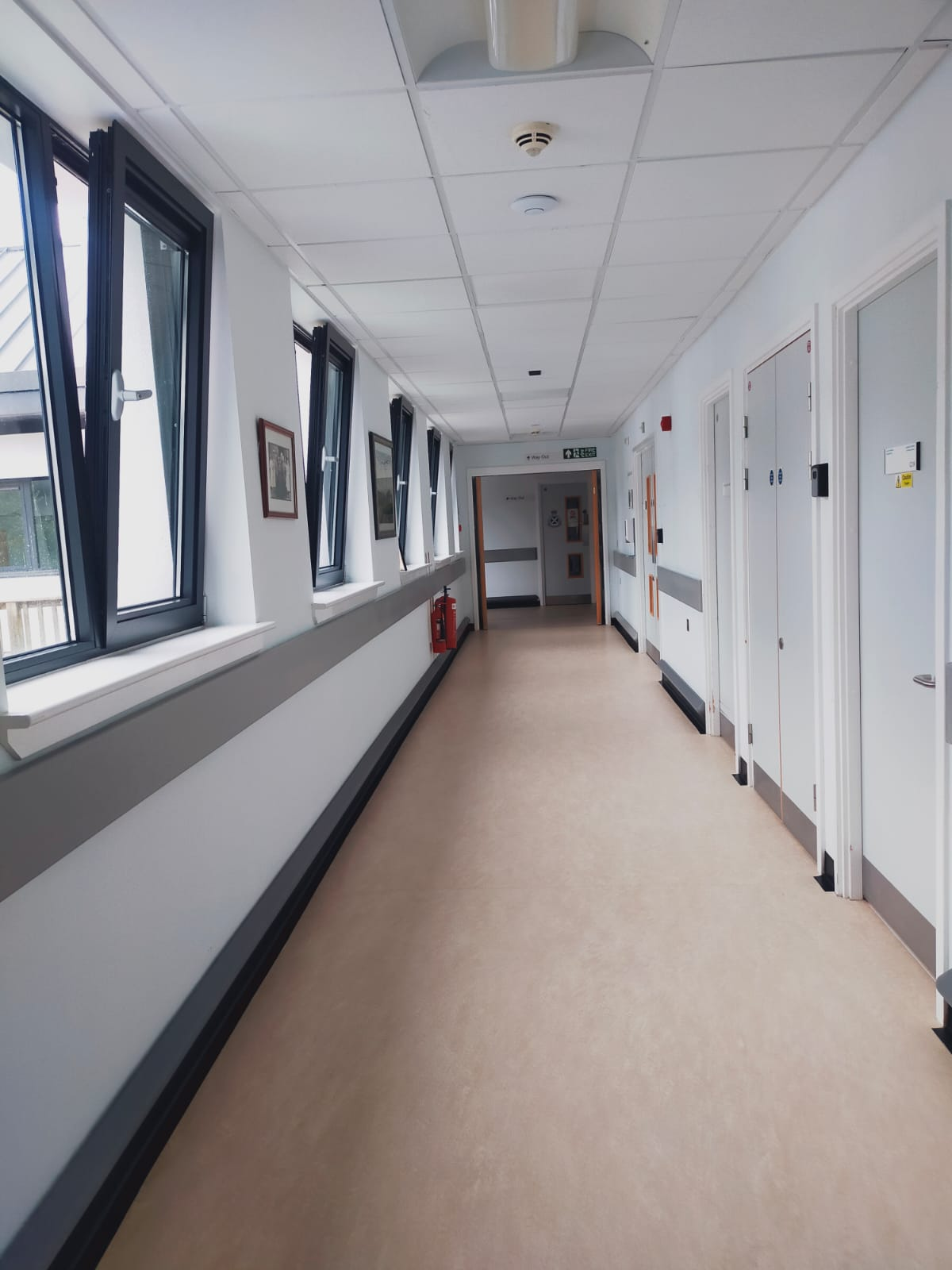
Mid Argyll Hospital pathway

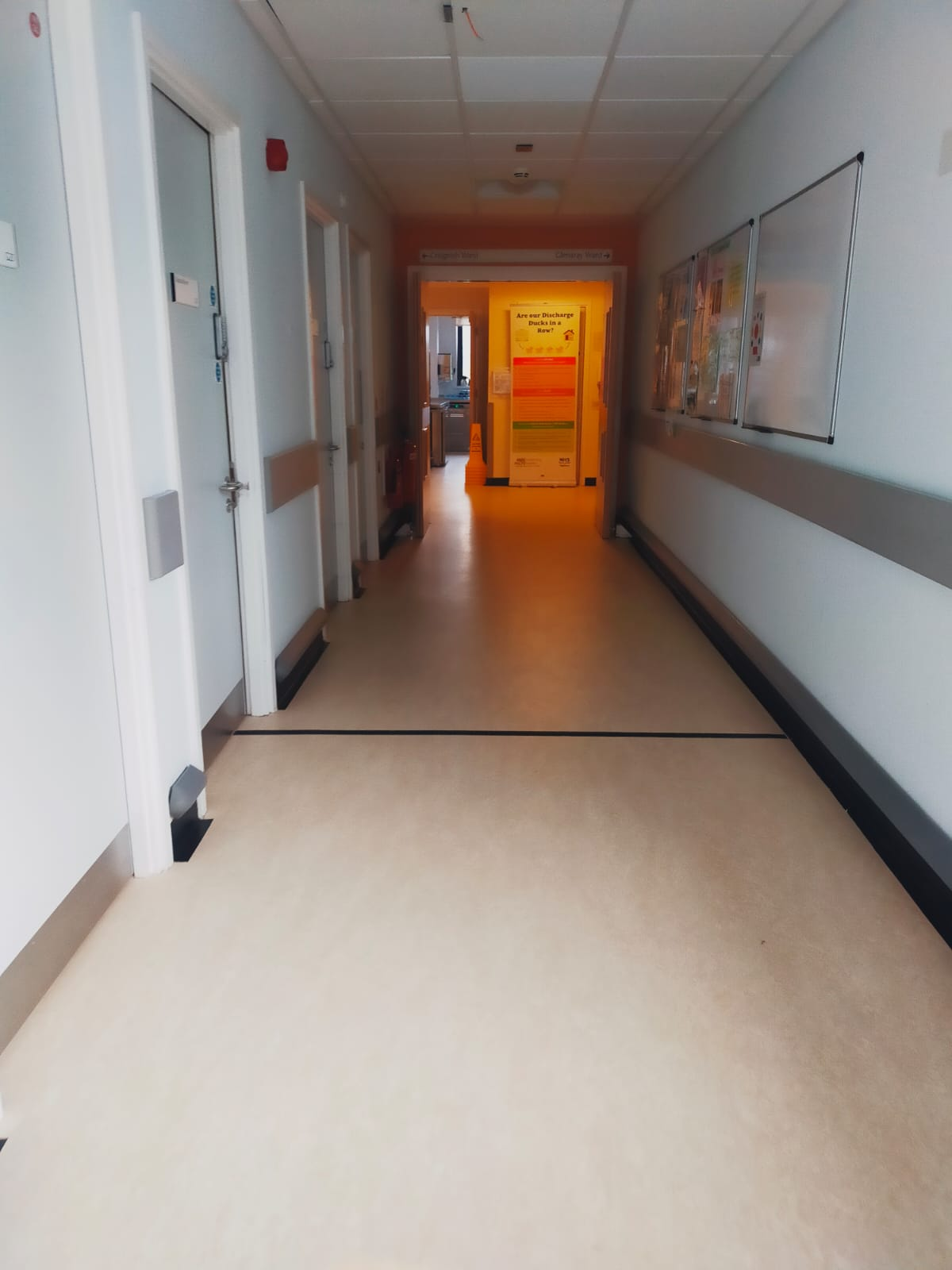
Mid Argyll Hospital pathway

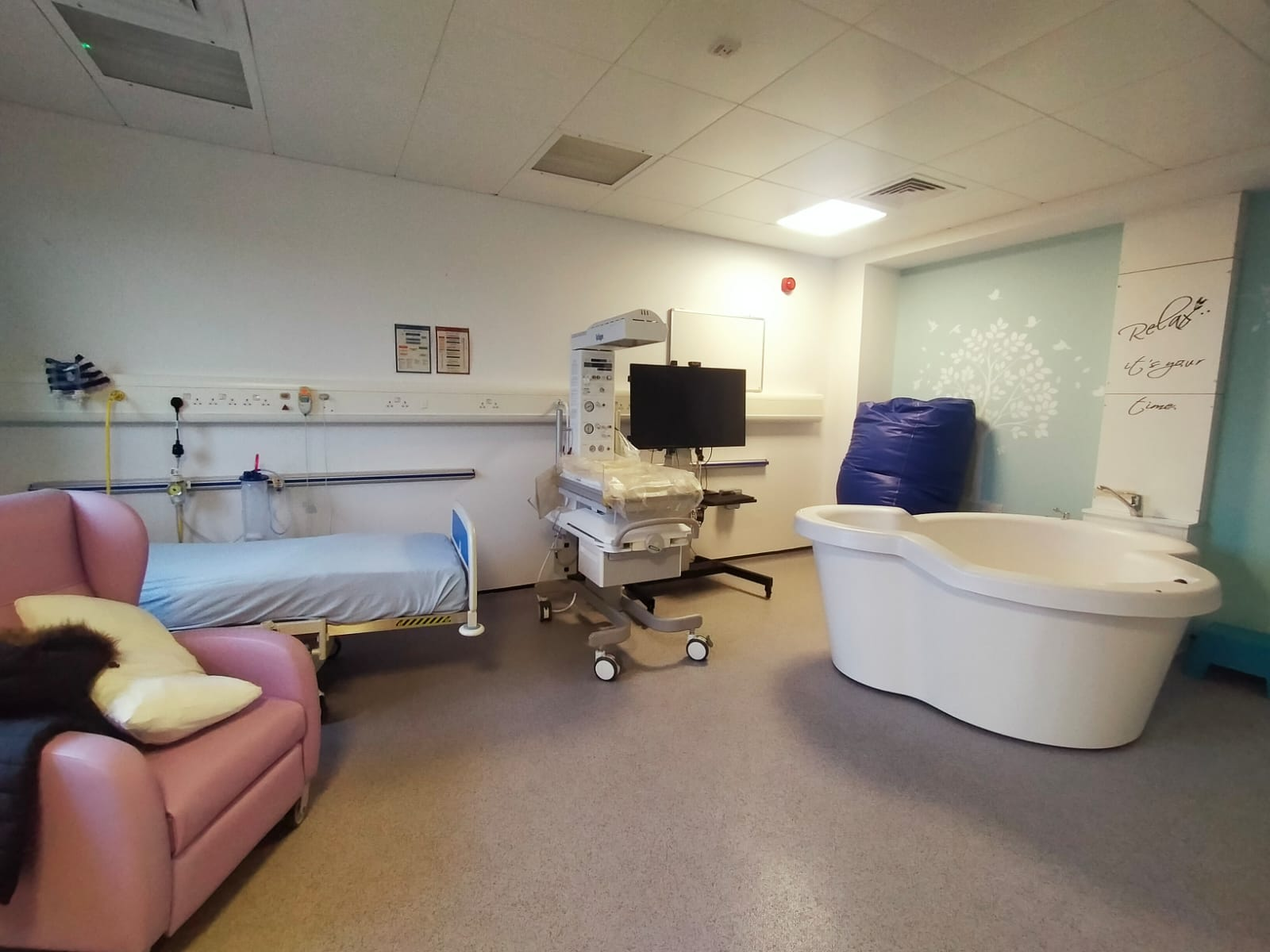
Mid Argyll Hospital Maternity ward

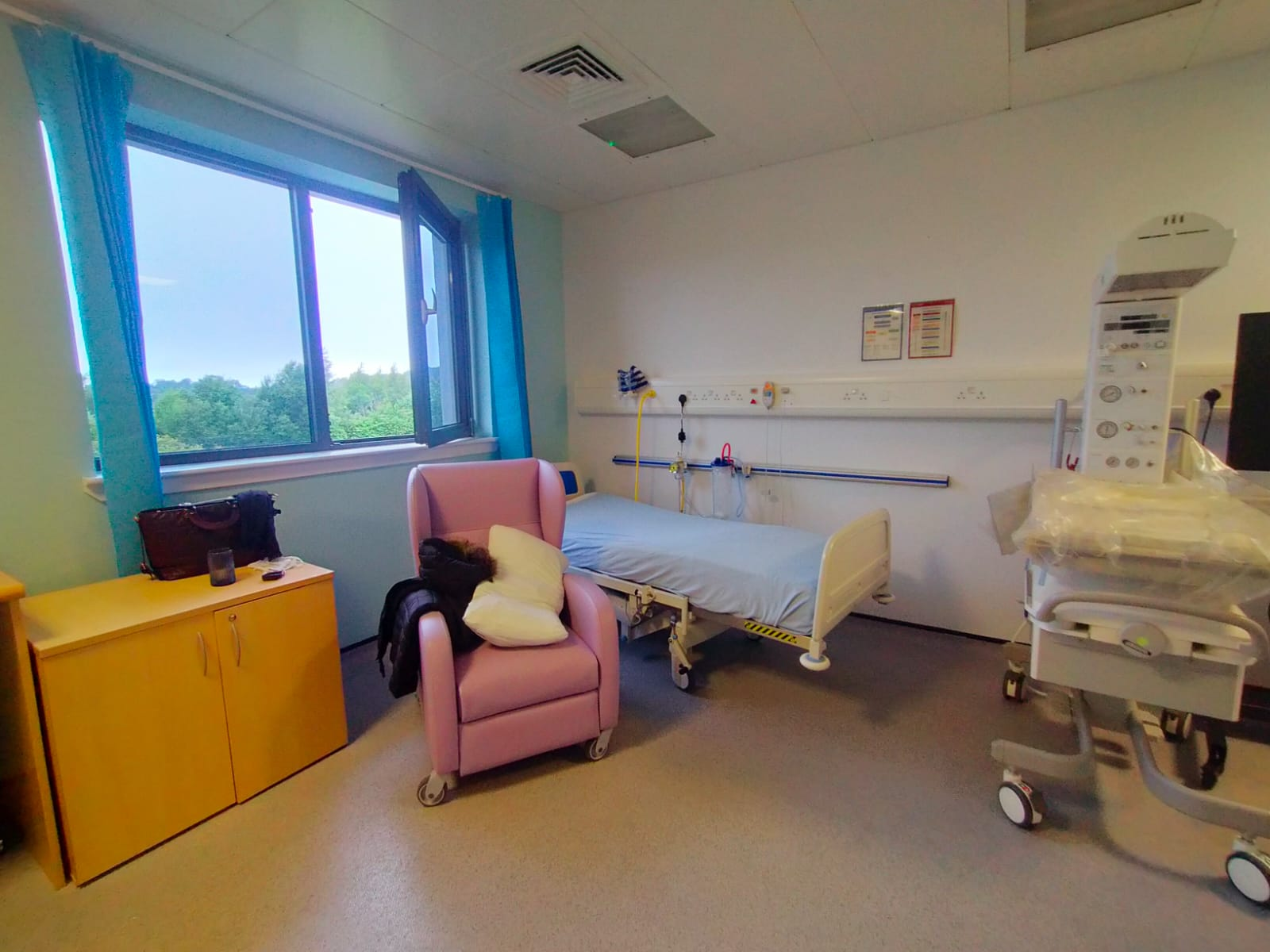
Mid Argyll Hospital Maternity ward

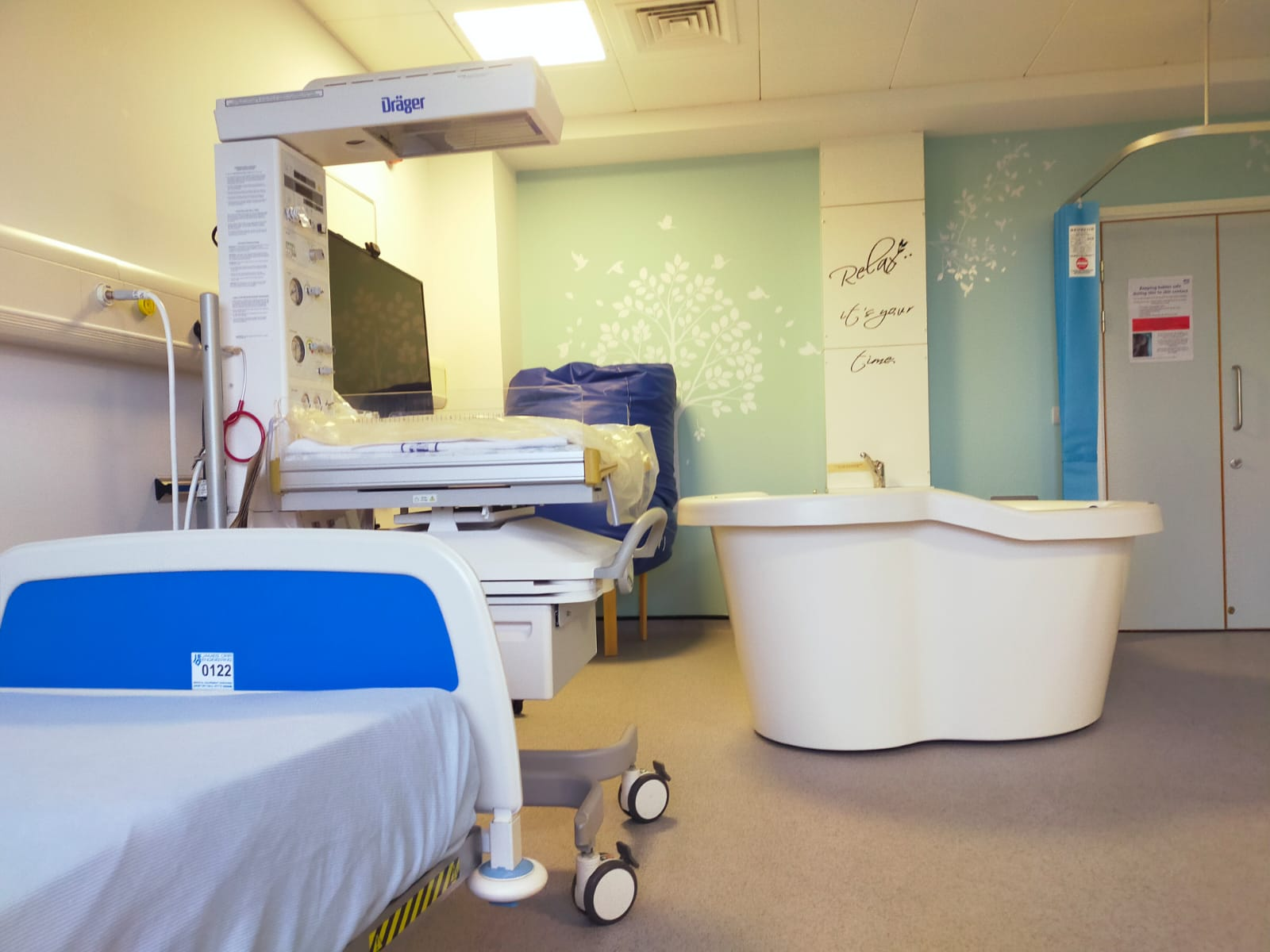
Mid Argyll Hospital Maternity ward

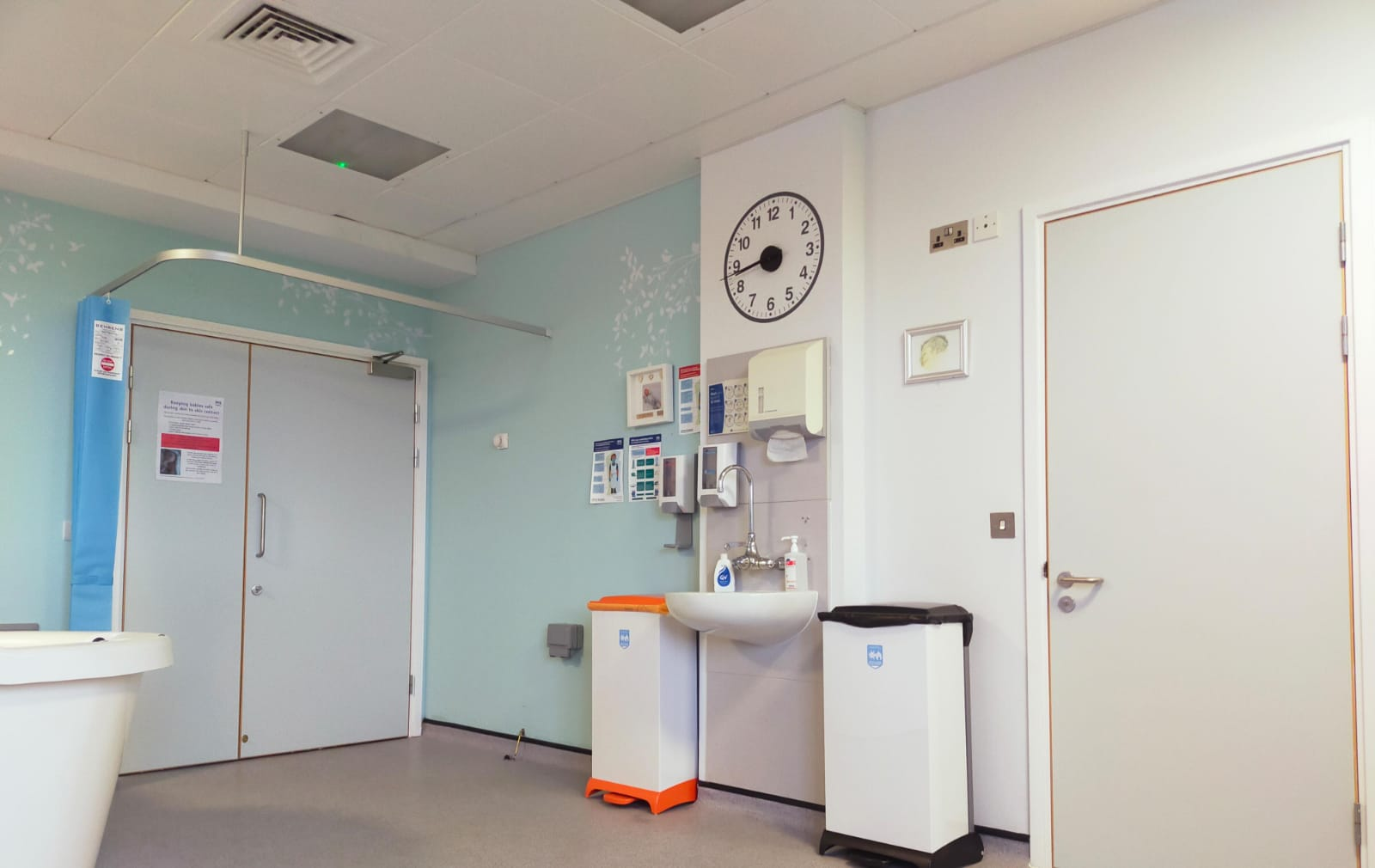
Mid Argyll Hospital Maternity ward
