= Wick Town and County Hospital =

- NHS Highland
- Location within Caithness

Geography
- Location: Seaforth Avenue, Wick, Scotland
- Coordinates: 58.4329°N 3.0979°W

Organisation
- Care system: NHS Scotland
- Type: General

Services
- Emergency department: No

History
- Founded: 1910

Links
- Lists: Hospitals in Scotland

Wick Town and County Hospital is a health facility in Seaforth Avenue, Wick, Scotland. It is managed by NHS Highland.

== History ==
The facility, which was designed by Sinclair Macdonald as an infectious diseases hospital, opened in 1910. The hospital joined the National Health Service in 1948 and a modern extension has since been built on the site. Protesters concerned about the potential closure of the hospital held candlelight meetings in October 2017.
