= Lightburn Hospital =

- NHS Greater Glasgow and Clyde
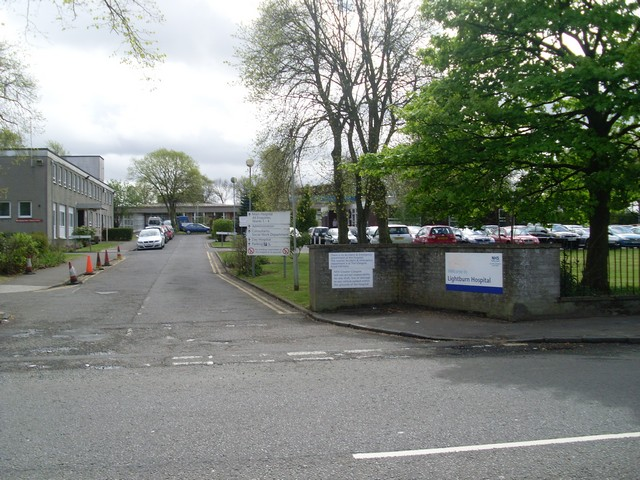
- Lightburn Hospital

- Shown in Glasgow

Geography
- Location: Carntyne Road, Glasgow, Scotland
- Coordinates: 55.8604°N 4.1655°W

Organisation
- Care system: NHS Scotland
- Type: Geriatric

Services
- Emergency department: No

History
- Founded: 1903

Links
- Website: Lightburn Hospital
- Lists: Hospitals in Scotland

Lightburn Hospital is a health facility in Carntyne Road, Glasgow, Scotland. It is managed by NHS Greater Glasgow and Clyde.

== History ==
The facility (located just off the A8 Edinburgh Road in the east end of the city) has its origins in the old Lightburn Infectious Diseases Hospital which was designed by James Thomson and completed in 1896. It joined the National Health Service in 1948. The infectious diseases hospital closed in 1964 and was replaced by a new 120‑bed geriatric unit. The new unit was extended in 1972 and in 1977. A proposal from the health board to close the hospital was rejected by the Scottish Government in January 2018; a similar plan was halted in 2011.
