= Islay Hospital =

- NHS Highland
- Location within Islay

Geography
- Location: Gortanvogie Road, Bowmore, Scotland
- Coordinates: 55.7557°N 6.2794°W

Organisation
- Care system: NHS Scotland
- Type: General

Services
- Emergency department: Yes

History
- Founded: 1865

Links
- Lists: Hospitals in Scotland

Islay Hospital is a community hospital in Gortanvogie Road, Bowmore, Scotland. It is managed by NHS Highland.

== History ==
The facility has its origins in the poorhouse for the Islay Combination of parishes. The poorhouse was established on the site in 1865. It joined the National Health Service as Gortanvogie House in 1948. In the early 1960s, it was decided to replace both Gortanvogie House and the old Gartnatra Hospital with modern facilities in Gortanvogie Road; the new facilities, which were designed by Kenneth Geoffrey Ellis, opened in 1966. Dental services are provided from a portable cabin in the car parking of the hospital.
