= Mull and Iona Community Hospital =

- NHS Highland
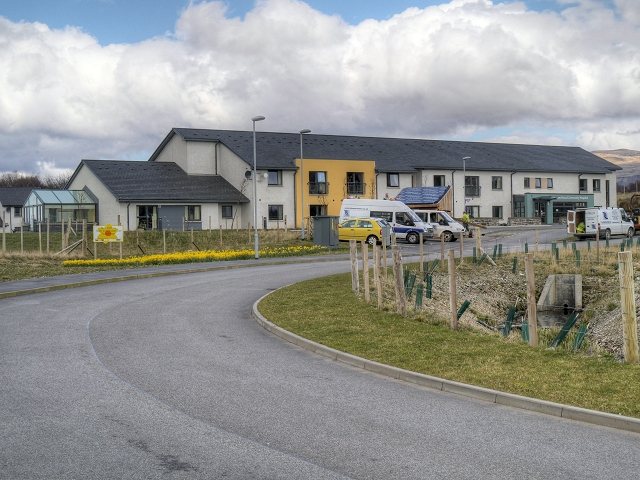
- Mull and Iona Community Hospital

- Location within Argyll and Bute

Geography
- Location: Java Road, Craignure, Scotland
- Coordinates: 56.4796°N 5.7157°W

Organisation
- Care system: NHS Scotland
- Type: General

Services
- Emergency department: Yes

History
- Founded: 2013

Links
- Lists: Hospitals in Scotland

Mull and Iona Community Hospital is a community hospital in Java Road, Craignure, Scotland. It is managed by NHS Highland.

== History ==
The facility was commissioned to replace the aging Dunaros Residential Care Centre and the Salen Community Hospital. It was designed by CMA Architects and built by a local contractor at a cost of £8 million; it was opened in 2012. Additional roads were provided later to improve access to this remote facility.
