= Dunbar Hospital, Thurso =

Dunbar Hospital
- NHS Highland
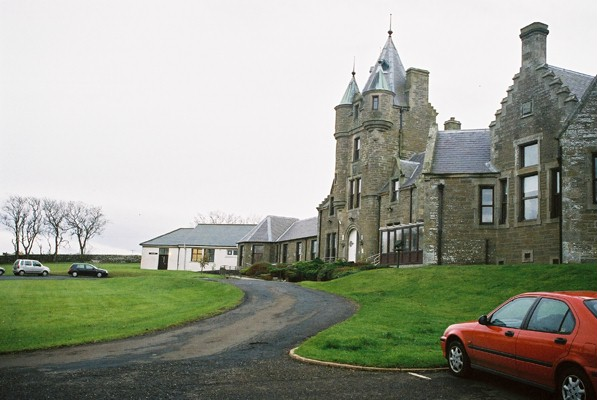
- Dunbar Hospital

- Location within Caithness

Geography
- Location: Ormlie Road, Thurso, Scotland
- Coordinates: 58.5836°N 3.5394°W

Organisation
- Care system: NHS Scotland
- Type: General

Services
- Emergency department: No

History
- Founded: 1885

Links
- Lists: Hospitals in Scotland

Dunbar Hospital is a health facility in Ormlie Road, Thurso, Scotland. It is managed by NHS Highland.

== History ==
The facility, which financed by a legacy from Mr Alexander Dunbar and designed in the Scottish baronial style, opened in 1885. After the hospital joined the National Health Service in 1948, additions included a new maternity wing in 1960 and a physiotherapy department in 1970. It was confirmed in July 2017 that, despite discharging its only inpatient, the hospital would remain open for business.
