= Belford Hospital =

Rural general hospital in Fort William, Lochaber, Scotland

- NHS Highland
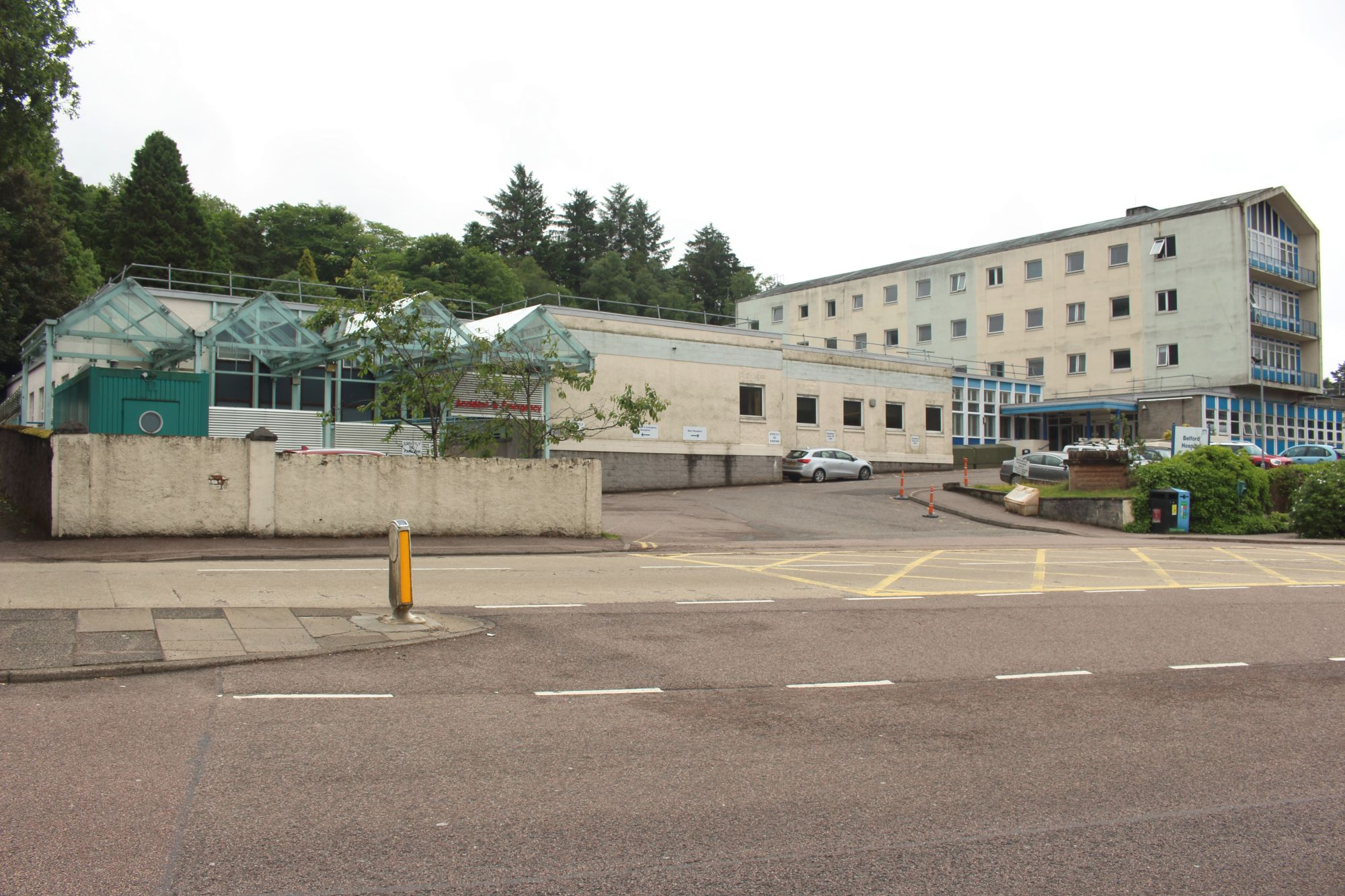
- Belford Hospital

- Location in Lochaber Location in Scotland Location in United Kingdom

Geography
- Location: Fort William, Highland, Scotland
- Coordinates: 56°49′10″N 5°6′14″W

Organisation
- Care system: NHS Scotland
- Type: Rural general hospital
- Affiliated university: University of Aberdeen

Services
- Emergency department: Yes
- Beds: 34

Helipads
- Helipad: No

History
- Founded: 1863

Links
- Website: Official Website
- Lists: Hospitals in Scotland

Belford Hospital, locally known as The Belford, is a rural general hospital in Fort William, Lochaber, Scotland. It is managed by NHS Highland.

== History ==
The original hospital, which was financed by a legacy from Andrew Belford and designed by Henry Burrell, opened in 1865. A prefabricated hospital for fever patients was erected in the grounds in 1893 but, after it burnt down in 1900, was replaced by a more permanent structure in 1901. The main facility was extended following a donation by Balfour Beatty in 1928. After the existing facility proved inadequate, a new hospital, which was designed by Joseph Gleave and built by Arnott Macleod, was officially opened by Princess Margaret and the Earl of Snowdon in April 1965.

When the Scottish Executive looked at reorganising rural health care in 2004 there were clear reasons put forward to retain provision of an emergency service at the Belford. Following this there were calls to work more closely with the Lorn and Islands Hospital in Oban. In 2006, following the Kerr report, the Belford was designated a rural general hospital.

At the end of November 2009 the surgical and medical wards were merged to form a Combined Assessment Unit (CAU).

== Services ==
There are 34 inpatient beds and a 10-bedded day case unit. The emergency department sees around 9,000 patients a year making it one of the smallest in Scotland; however due to its proximity to the outdoor activity centres in the Lochaber region sees proportionally a significant amount of trauma prior to transfer to tertiary centres in Edinburgh, Glasgow and Aberdeen.

There is also a midwife-led service to provide maternity care. In September 2009 it achieved stage 1 of the baby-friendly accreditation programme. Although equipped to perform antenatal ultrasound scans, this service has not been offered at the Belford since June 2012, because of a national shortage of appropriately trained staff. There are also specialist in-patient services for older people.
