= Migdale Hospital =

- NHS Highland
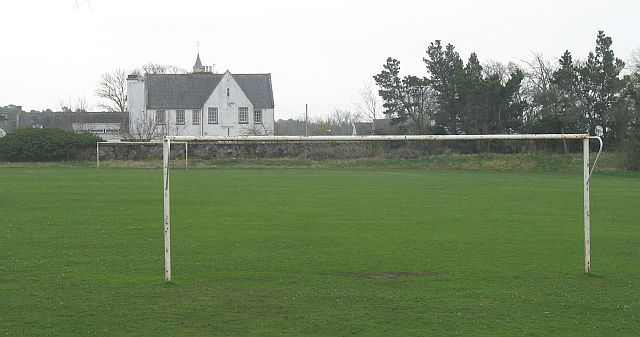
- The old Migdale Hospital

- Shown in Sutherland

Geography
- Location: Cherry Grove, Bonar Bridge, Scotland
- Coordinates: 57.8914°N 4.3429°W

Organisation
- Care system: NHS Scotland
- Type: General

Services
- Beds: 22

History
- Founded: 1865

Links
- Lists: Hospitals in Scotland

The Migdale Hospital is a health facility in Bonar Bridge, Scotland. It is managed by NHS Highland.

== History ==
The facility has its origins in the Sutherland Combination Poorhouse which was designed by Andrew Maitland and completed in 1865. It joined the National Health Service as the Sworedale Institution in 1948. It was replaced by a modern facility, located closer to Bonar Bridge, which was designed by Austin-Smith:Lord and built by Robertson Construction at a cost of £8 million. It opened to patients in June 2011 and was officially opened by Michael Matheson, Minister for Public Health, in August 2012. In 2020 services were reconfigured.
