= Lorn and Islands Hospital =

Lorn & Islands Hospital
- NHS Highland
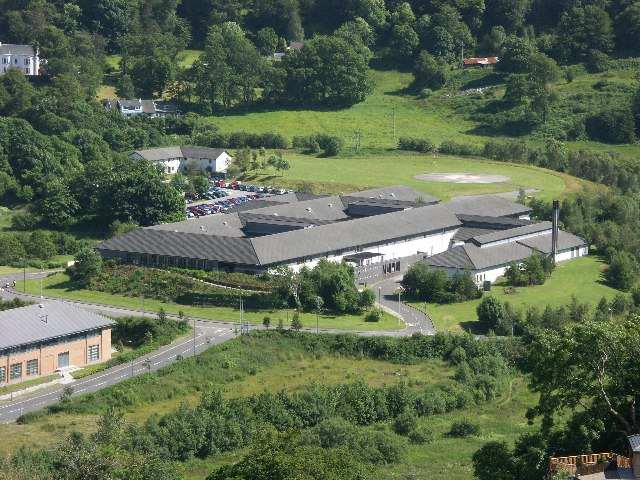
- Lorn and Islands Hospital

- Shown in Argyll and Bute

Geography
- Location: Oban, Argyll and Bute, Scotland
- Coordinates: 56.400094°N 5.47426°W

Organisation
- Care system: NHS Scotland
- Type: Rural General Hospital
- Affiliated university: University of Aberdeen

Services
- Emergency department: Yes
- Beds: 66

Helipads
- Helipad: Yes

History
- Founded: 1995

Links
- Website: Official Website
- Lists: Hospitals in Scotland

Lorn & Islands Hospital is a rural general hospital on the southern outskirts of Oban in Argyll, Scotland. It is managed by NHS Highland.

== History ==
The hospital was designed by Reiach & Hall using a design solution that has been recognised as particularly well-suited to the local environment. It was officially opened in 1995.

When the Scottish Executive looked at reorganising rural health care in 2004 there were local protests: following this there were calls to work more closely with the Belford Hospital in Fort William.

A new audiology unit was opened by Rhona Brankin, deputy health minister, in 2005.

== Services ==
Since this facility opened it has been possible for a number of services to be run from one location, where previously they had been provided from some smaller facilities located across the district. A range of services are provided and the hospital has 66 inpatient beds and a multi-purpose day hospital.

There is also a midwife-led service to provide maternity care. In September 2009 it achieved stage 1 of the baby-friendly accreditation programme. A multi-disciplinary team treats patients who are admitted to the hospital following a stroke. The stroke team offers continuity to patients from admission to the point of discharge and even into the community, where appropriate. Although plans to offer a dentistry treatment service from the hospital have been approved, by March 2014 there was still no confirmation about when this would be operational.

Palliative care services are also organised through the hospital after the McKelvie Hospital, a small Victorian era cottage hospital in Oban, had closed 2000.
