= Dumbarton Joint Hospital =

- NHS Greater Glasgow and Clyde
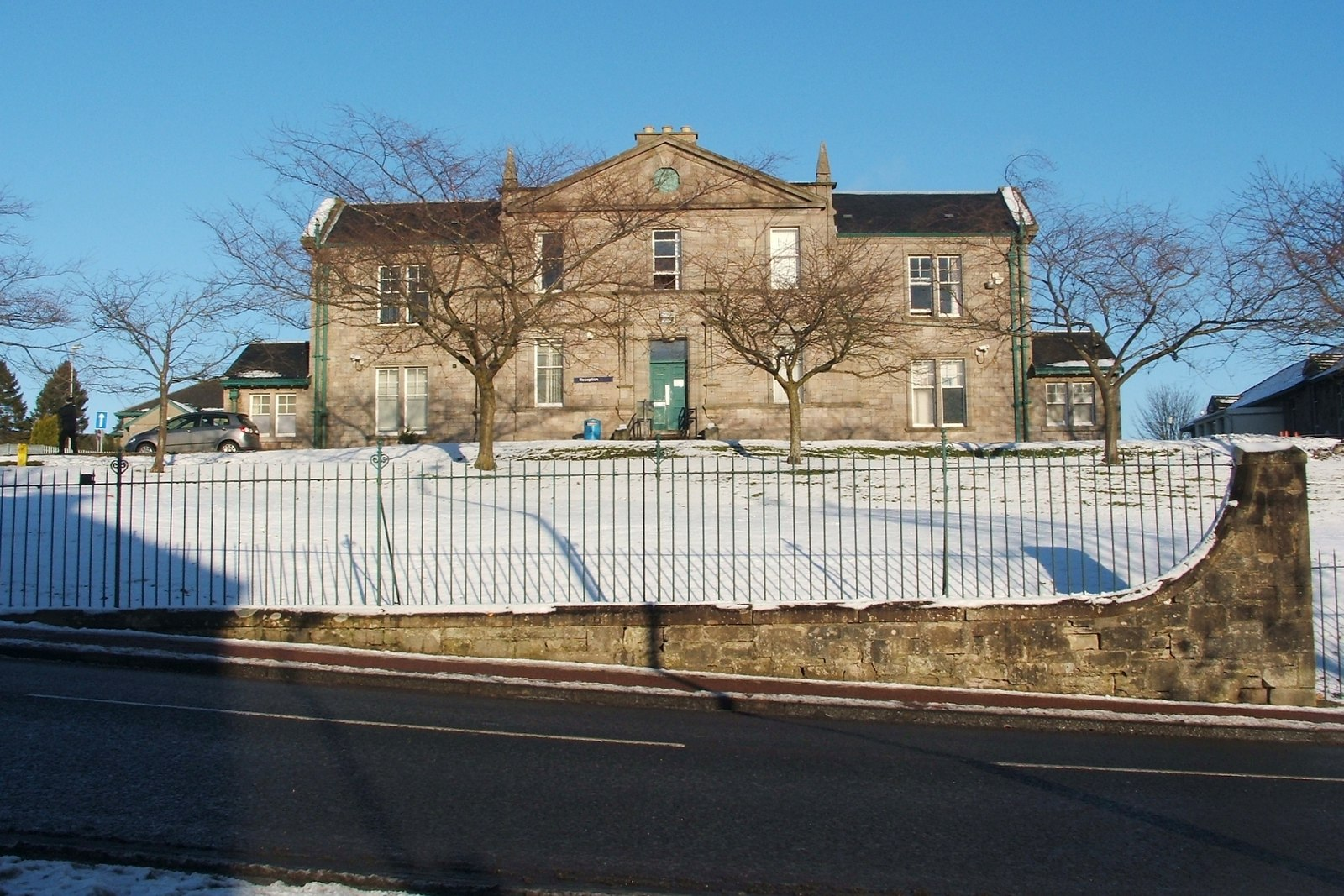
- Dumbarton Joint Hospital

- Shown in West Dunbartonshire

Geography
- Location: Cardross Road, Dumbarton, Scotland
- Coordinates: 55.9486°N 4.5948°W

Organisation
- Care system: NHS Scotland
- Type: Geriatric

Services
- Emergency department: No

History
- Founded: 1898

Links
- Website: Dumbarton Joint Hospital
- Lists: Hospitals in Scotland

Dumbarton Joint Hospital is a health facility on Cardross Road in Dumbarton, West Dunbartonshire, Scotland. It is managed by NHS Greater Glasgow and Clyde.

== History ==
The facility, which was designed by John McLean Crawford (1854–1950), was established as an infectious diseases hospital in 1898. The hospital joined the National Health Service in 1948 and subsequently focused on provision of geriatric care with some wards specialising in dementia and other mental health difficulties.
