= St Michael's Hospital, Linlithgow =

- NHS Lothian
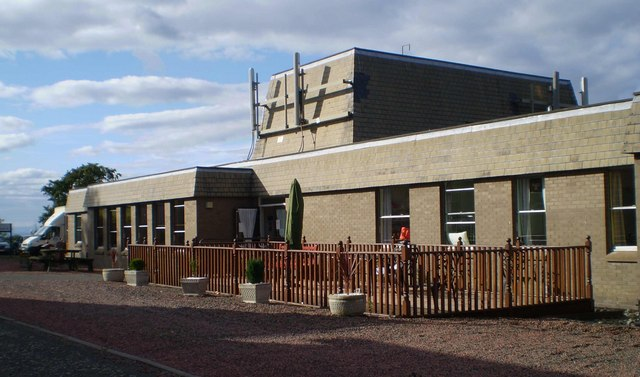
- St Michael's Hospital

- Shown in West Lothian

Geography
- Location: Linlithgow, West Lothian, Scotland
- Coordinates: 55°58′30″N 3°35′14″W

Organisation
- Care system: NHS Scotland

Services
- Emergency department: No
- Beds: 24

History
- Closed: 2022

Links
- Website: NHS Lothian: St Michael's Hospital
- Lists: Hospitals in Scotland

St Michael's Hospital, Linlithgow, was a community hospital in Linlithgow, Scotland, operated by NHS Lothian.

== History ==
The hospital had its origins in the Linlithgow Combination Poorhouse and Infirmary which opened on the site in 1856. An infectious diseases hospital was built on an adjacent site in around 1900. The poorhouse infirmary and the infectious diseases hospital came together to form St Michael's Home and Hospital in 1932. The combined facility joined the National Health Service in 1948. The poorhouse building was demolished in 1969 and replaced with the most recent facility.

== Closure ==
During the COVID-19 pandemic the hospital was temporarily closed, primarily due to a nursing shortage. In June 2022, it was decided by the NHS Lothian health board that the site should be permanently closed, with a final decision pending public consultation.
