= St Vincent's Hospital, Kingussie =

Former Hospital in Kingussie, Scotland

St Vincent's Hospital
- NHS Highland
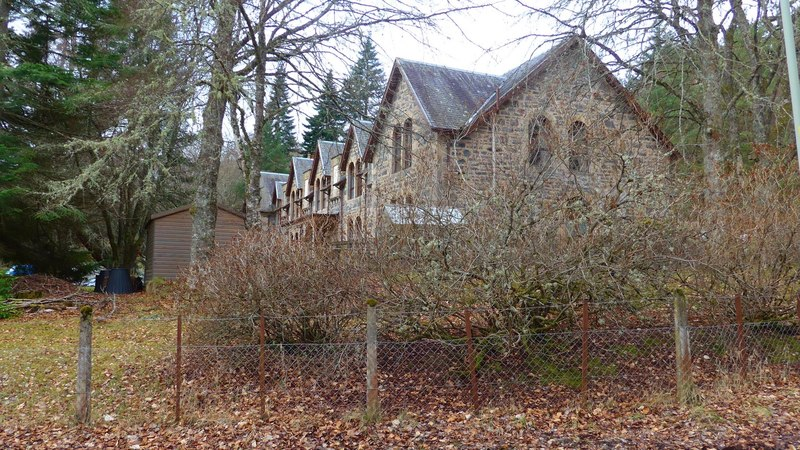
- St Vincent's Hospital

- Location within Badenoch and Strathspey

Geography
- Location: Gynack Road, Kingussie, Scotland
- Coordinates: 57.0846°N 4.0570°W

Organisation
- Care system: NHS Scotland

History
- Founded: 1901
- Closed: 2021

Links
- Lists: Hospitals in Scotland

St Vincent's Hospital is a former health facility located in Kingussie, Scotland. The site was closed in 2021 due to the opening of the Badenoch and Strathspey Community Hospital in Aviemore.

== History ==
The facility, which was founded by Dr de Watteville, opened as the Grampian Sanatorium in 1901. It was acquired by the Sisters of Charity of Saint Vincent de Paul and only joined the National Health Service in 1986. In February 2015, it was announced that the hospital would close once a new health centre in Aviemore had been completed.
