= Victoria Hospital, Rothesay =

Victoria Hospital
- NHS Highland
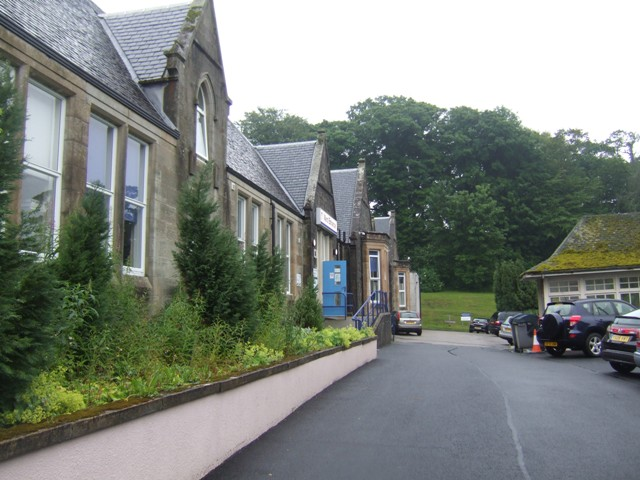
- Victoria Hospital

- Location on Bute

Geography
- Location: High Street, Rothesay, Scotland
- Coordinates: 55.8300°N 5.0554°W

Organisation
- Care system: NHS Scotland
- Type: General

Services
- Emergency department: Yes

History
- Founded: 1873

Links
- Lists: Hospitals in Scotland

Victoria Hospital is a health facility in High Street, Rothesay, Scotland. It is managed by NHS Highland.

== History ==
The facility has its origins in the Robertson Stewart Hospital for infectious diseases which opened in 1873. A new hospital, which was designed by John Russell Thomson, was built adjacent to the original facility and opened as the Victoria Cottage Hospital in 1897. It was extended in 1927 and, after joining the National Health Service in 1948, it was re-organised to create a dedicated palliative care area in 2018.
