= Albyn Hospital =

- Circle Health Group
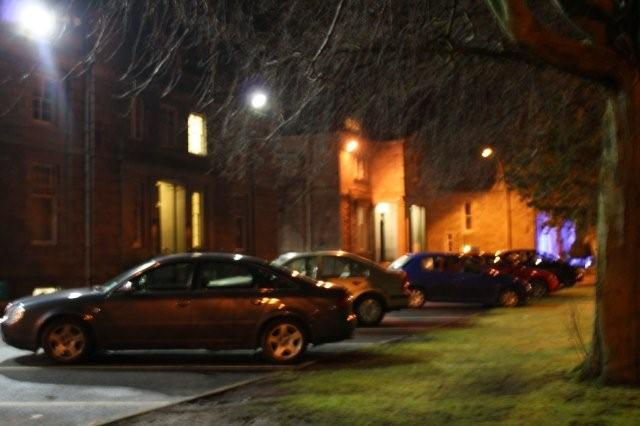
- The front car park and granite buildings of Albyn Hospital at night

- Shown in Aberdeen

Geography
- Location: 21-24 Albyn Place, Aberdeen, Scotland
- Coordinates: 57.1424°N 2.1206°W

Organisation
- Care system: Private
- Type: Acute Surgical and Medical

Services
- Emergency department: No
- Beds: 30

History
- Founded: Early 1950s

Links
- Lists: Hospitals in Scotland

Albyn Hospital is a private hospital in Aberdeen, Scotland. It is situated on Albyn Place, and is managed by Circle Health Group.

== History ==
The buildings in which the hospital is located were built as villas in the 1830s. The St John Nursing Home was established in the buildings by members of the Order of St John in the early 1950s. St John's Spring was moved there from Skene Row at Hardweird in 1955 and the Aberdeen Mountain Rescue Association was established in a garage in the grounds of the buildings in 1964.

The hospital was acquired by BMI Healthcare in August 1995. After a Healthcare Improvement Scotland inspection in 2014 the hospital was told to upgrade its clinical hand wash basins and to ensure that staff understood how to clean up spillages of body fluids.
