= Ross Memorial Hospital =

- NHS Highland
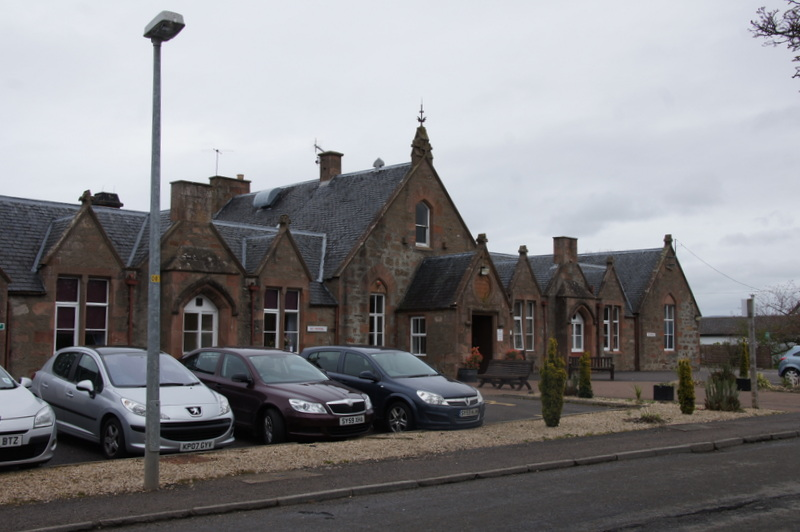
- Ross Memorial Hospital

- Shown in Ross and Cromarty

Geography
- Location: Ferry Road, Dingwall, Highland, Scotland
- Coordinates: 57.5944°N 4.4176°W

Organisation
- Care system: NHS Scotland
- Type: General

History
- Founded: 1873

Ross Memorial Hospital is a health facility in Ferry Road, Dingwall, Scotland. It is managed by NHS Highland. It is a Category B listed building.

== History ==
The facility, which was designed by William Cumming Joass, was built as a memorial to Dr William Ross and opened in 1873. Additions included a new isolation hospital in 1909 and a new maternity wing in 1939 and, after joining the National Health Service in 1948, a new out-patient department opened in 1962.
