= County Community Hospital, Invergordon =

County Community Hospital
- NHS Highland
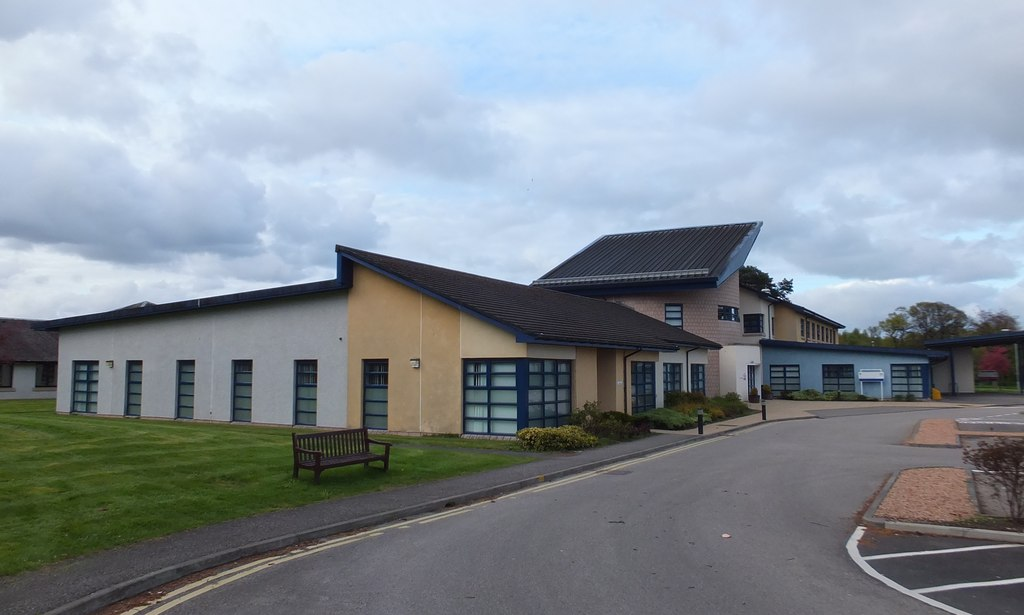
- County Community Hospital

- Shown in Ross and Cromarty

Geography
- Location: Saltburn Road, Invergordon, Highland, Scotland
- Coordinates: 57.6963°N 4.1518°W

Organisation
- Care system: NHS Scotland
- Type: General

History
- Founded: 1917

County Community Hospital is a health facility in Saltburn Road, Invergordon, Scotland. It is managed by NHS Highland.

== History ==
The facility has its origins in a naval hospital which was established on the site in 1917. Casualties were transported to Invergordon by steam drifter and then to the hospital by train during the First World War. It became an infectious diseases hospital in 1920 and, after being renamed the County Hospital, joined the National Health Service in 1948. After the old hospital became decrepit, a new facility was procured under a private finance initiative contract. The new facility, which was built by Robertson Group at a cost of £8.8 million, opened in October 2005.
