= Fraserburgh Hospital =

- NHS Grampian
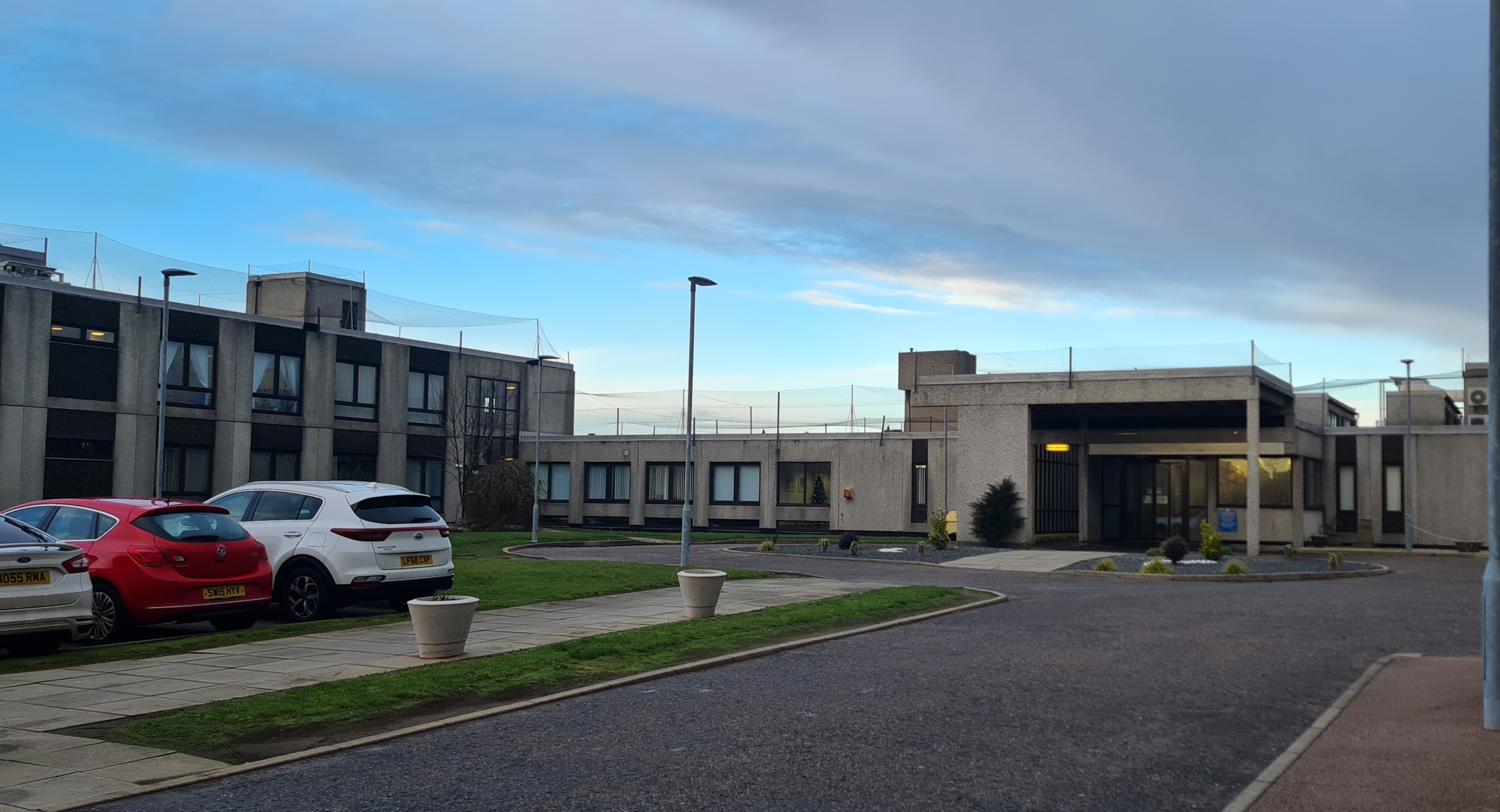
- Fraserburgh Hospital in 2022

- Location within Aberdeenshire

Geography
- Location: Lochpots Road, Fraserburgh, Scotland
- Coordinates: 57.6877°N 2.0194°W

Organisation
- Care system: NHS Scotland
- Type: General

Services
- Emergency department: Yes

History
- Founded: 1968

Links
- Lists: Hospitals in Scotland

Fraserburgh Hospital is a community hospital in Lochpots Road, Fraserburgh, Scotland. It is managed by NHS Grampian.

== History ==
The facility was established as an infectious diseases hospital in 1905.

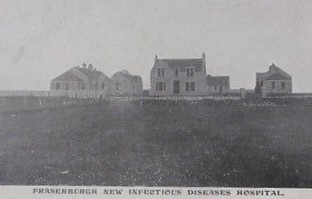
Old Fraserburgh Infectious Diseases hospital from a postcard

It joined the National Health Service in 1948. The old infectious diseases hospital was demolished in order to make way for a modern facility which was also intended to replace the old Thomas Walker Hospital in Charlotte Street which had opened in 1878. The new facility was designed by Moira & Moira and opened on the site by Sidney G. Davidson FRCS in September 1968. The Princess Royal visited the site to celebrate the hospital's 50th anniversary on 27 September 2018.

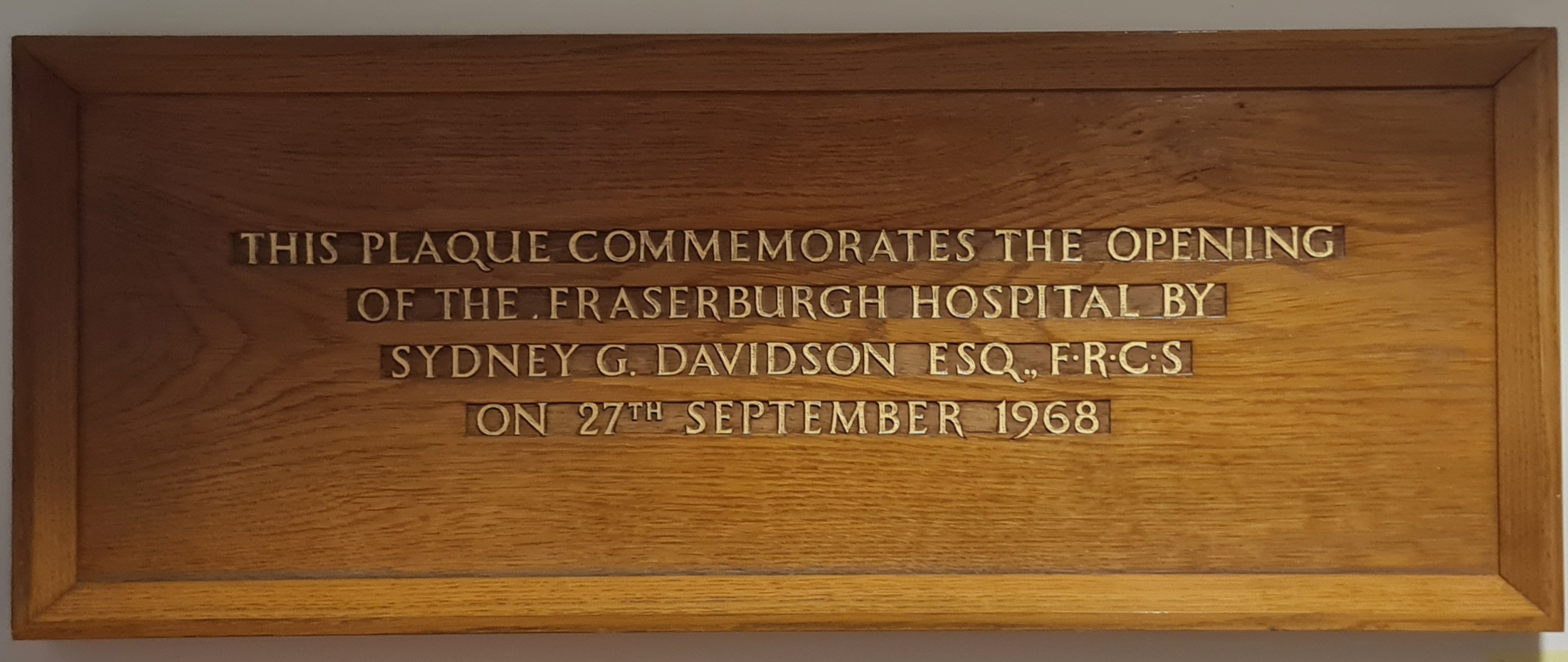
Commemorative plaque marking the opening of Fraserburgh Hospital in 1968

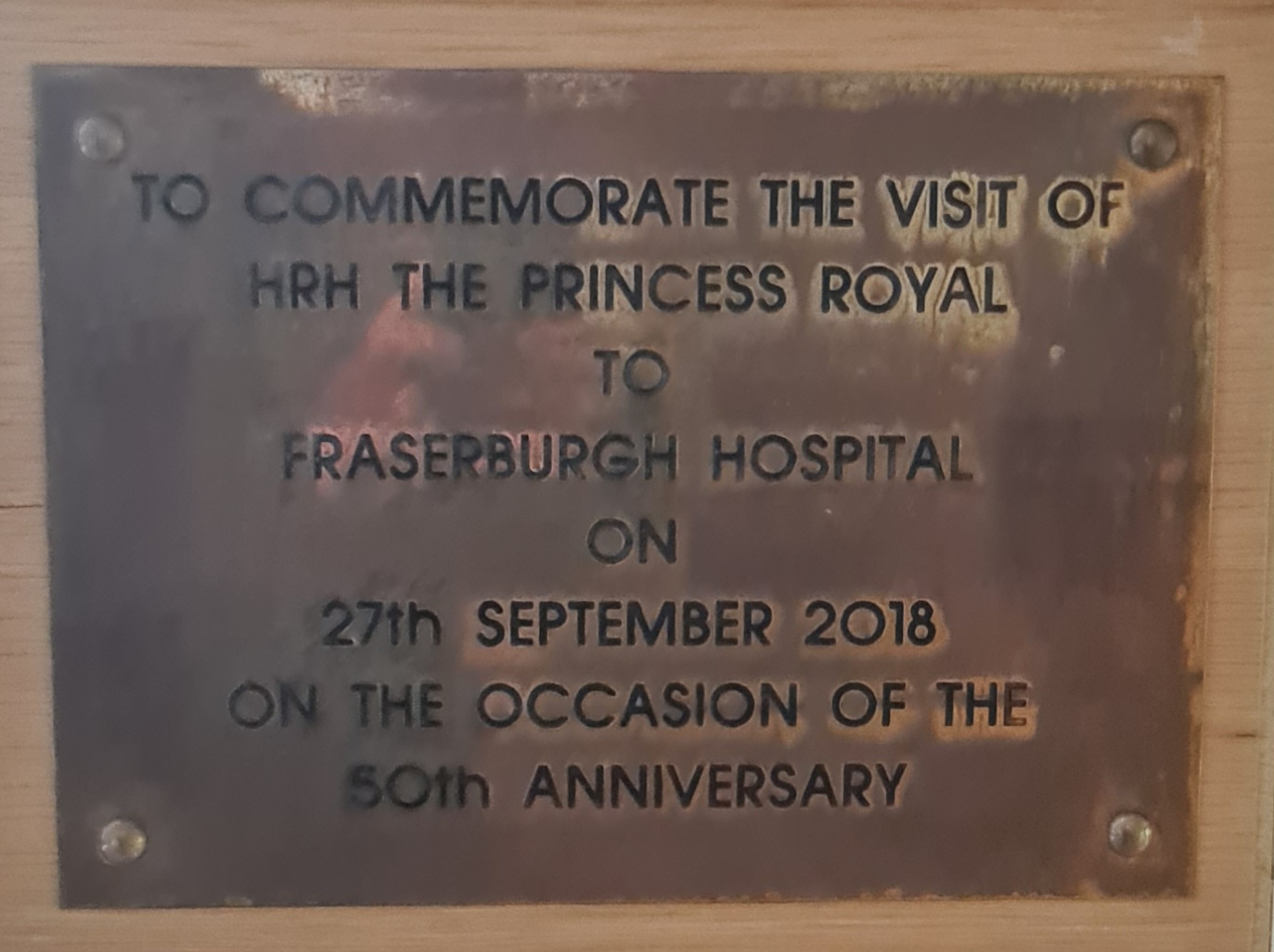
Commemorative plaque marking 50th anniversary visit by the Princess Royal

== Services ==
The hospital is supported by GP services from Central Buchan Medical Group, Crimond Surgery, Finlayson Street Medical Practice and Saltoun Surgery. It has a minor injuries unit.
