= NHS Highland =

NHS board based in Inverness, Scotland

- NHS na Gàidhealtachd

- Type: NHS board
- Headquarters: Assynt House; Beechwood Park; Inverness; IV2 3BW
- Region served: Argyll and Bute; Highland
- Hospitals: Belford Hospital; Caithness General Hospital; Campbeltown Hospital; County Community Hospital; Cowal Community Hospital; Dunbar Hospital; Mackinnon Memorial Hospital; Ian Charles Community Hospital; Islay Hospital; Lawson Memorial Hospital; Lorn and Islands Hospital; Mid Argyll Community Hospital; Migdale Hospital; Mull and Iona Community Hospital; Nairn Town and County Hospital; New Craigs Hospital; Portree Hospital; RNI Community Hospital; Ross Memorial Hospital; St Vincent's Hospital; Victoria Hospital; Victoria Integrated Care Centre; Wick Town and County Hospital
- Staff: 9,692 WTE (2023/24)
- Website: www.nhshighland.scot.nhs.uk

NHS Highland (Scottish Gaelic: NHS na Gàidhealtachd) is one of the fourteen regions of NHS Scotland. Geographically, it is the largest Health Board, covering an area of 32,500 km^{2} (12,500 sq mi) from Kintyre in the south-west to Caithness in the north-east, serving a population of 320,000 people. In 2016–17 it had an operating budget of £780 million. It provides prehospital care, primary and secondary care services.

== Organisational structure ==
NHS Highland is composed of two Health and Social Care Partnerships (HSCPs):

- The Highland Health and Social Care partnership covers the local government area of Highland. It has two main divisions:
  - The North and West operational unit covers Caithness, Sutherland, Lochaber and Skye, Lochalsh and Wester Ross.
  - The Inner Moray Firth operating unit covers Raigmore Hospital, Badenoch and Strathspey, Mid Ross, Inverness and Nairn.
- The Argyll and Bute Health and Social Care Partnership covers the local government area of Argyll and Bute. This includes the Cowal peninsula, which is closer to services in the central belt than those in Inverness.

== History ==
On 1 October 2001 NHS Highland health board was established. NHS Highland's first board members were announced 10 days later. In 2005 Community Health Partnerships (CHPs) were introduced.

On 1 April 2006, NHS Highland took over responsibility for part of the former NHS Argyll and Clyde region (corresponding approximately to the Argyll and Bute council area), the other part of which was transferred to NHS Greater Glasgow and Clyde.

On 1 April 2012 NHS Highland became the lead agency responsible for Adult Social Care services, with the council taking over issues relating to children.

It directly employs over 10,500 people and there are also around 1,000 primary care staff in the region.

In December 2014, Broadford, Skye was chosen as the site for a new hospital, after a consultation process. Some campaigners had hoped that the central hub of services in Skye could have been based at Portree Hospital; however the Scottish Health Council has pronounced the process followed by the board as legitimate.

In 2017, the board reduced the number of main administrative buildings: refitting Assynt House, which the board owns, and reorganising Larch House, which is leased.

In 2017 the Highland PICT Team is started as a trial.

In 2020, Skyports, a drone delivery service provider, began delivering pathology samples, medicine, essential personal protective equipment and COVID-19 testing kits in Argyll and Bute. Delivery should take only 30 minutes, where previously it has taken 48 hours. Communication will be provided by Vodafone's 4G network and satellite communications. The plan is to integrate the operation into the local NHS supply chain.

In March 2022, the PICT Team was awarded Highland Hero Emergency Services Hero of the Year.

== Training initiatives ==
In 2011 NHS Highland announced it would be running a week-long "boot camp" for junior surgeons at Raigmore Hospital, Inverness.

== Prehospital Care ==
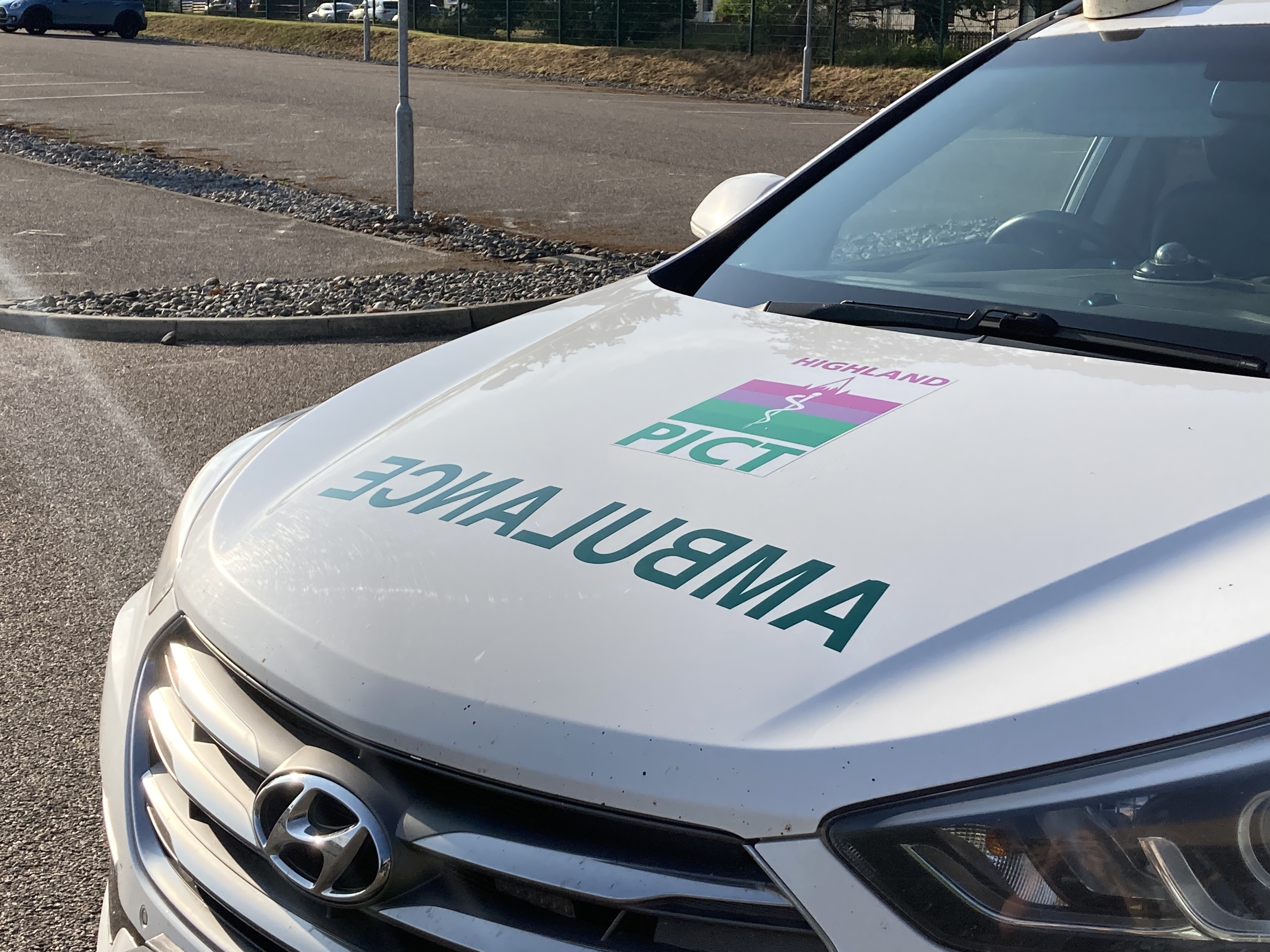
Response car used by PICT Team

NHS Highland funds and runs a specialist pre-hospital care team comprising a senior doctor and an advanced practitioner (nurse or paramedic). This is known as the Prehospital Immediate Care and Trauma (PICT) Team. The name being a play on words in relation to the Picts, the group of peoples who lived in what is now northern and eastern Scotland (north of the Firth of Forth) during Late Antiquity and the Early Middle Ages. The team was the winner of the 2022 Highland Heroes awards in the category of Emergency Services.

PICT currently operates 12 hours per day, seven days a week, responding to around 150 patients a month. The PICT Team responds by land to major trauma (as an integrated part of the Scottish Trauma Network) and critically unwell patients in the Highlands of Scotland. The doctor on the PICT Care will also assume the role of the medical incident officer when required at a major incident. The PICT Team have attended a variety of incidents, including aircraft crashes, road traffic collisions, stabbings, shootings and critically unwell patients.

NHS Highland announced in early 2022 that they would defund the Inverness PICT Team, in steps which will leave the Highlands and Inverness without a seven-day physician-led enhanced care service. This led to the local MSP Sir Edward Mountain to campaign to save this prehospital resource from defunding. Mountain stated that

"This pioneering service is essential when responding to major trauma incidents across the Highlands – we simply cannot afford to lose it."

== Hospitals ==
NHS Highland is responsible for a number of different types of hospital - a large district general hospital, 3 rural general hospitals, a psychiatric hospital and a number of community hospitals

=== District general hospital ===
- Raigmore Hospital, Inverness

=== Rural general hospitals ===
- Caithness General Hospital, Wick
- Belford Hospital, Fort William
- Lorn and Islands Hospital, Oban

=== Psychiatric hospitals ===
- Argyll and Bute Hospital, Lochgilphead
- New Craigs Hospital, Inverness

=== Community hospitals ===
- Badenoch and Strathspey Community Hospital, Aviemore
- Campbeltown Hospital, Campbeltown
- County Community Hospital, Invergordon
- Cowal Community Hospital, Dunoon
- Dunbar Hospital, Thurso
- Mackinnon Memorial Hospital, Broadford on Skye
- Islay Hospital, Bowmore
- Lawson Memorial Hospital, Golspie
- Mid Argyll Community Hospital, Lochgilphead
- Migdale Hospital, Bonar Bridge
- Mull and Iona Community Hospital, Isle of Mull
- Nairn Town and County Hospital, Nairn
- Portree Hospital, Portree
- RNI Community Hospital, Inverness
- Ross Memorial Hospital, Dingwall
- St Vincent's Hospital, Kingussie
- Victoria Hospital, Rothesay
- Victoria Integrated Care Centre, Helensburgh
- Wick Town and County Hospital, Wick

== Primary Care ==
The board started tests of the GP Near Me service with patients of Riverview Practice in Wick, Caithness in October 2018; with patients booking video appointments if a face-to-face appointment is not required. A similar system NHS Near Me has been used in Caithness for hospital outpatient appointments.

== See also ==
- Glencoe House
