= Royal Northern Infirmary =

- NHS Highland
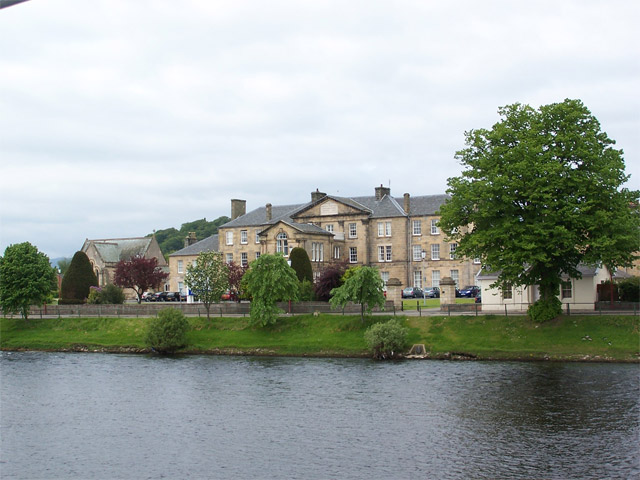
- Royal Northern Infirmary

- Shown in Inverness

Geography
- Location: Ness Walk, Inverness, Highland IV3 5SF, Scotland
- Coordinates: 57.4707°N 4.2319°W

Organisation
- Care system: NHS Scotland
- Type: General

History
- Founded: 1804

The Royal Northern Infirmary was a health facility in Ness Walk, Inverness, Scotland. The site remains the home of a small facility, known as the RNI Community Hospital, which was built in the grounds of the old hospital and is managed by NHS Highland.

== History ==
The structure was financed by public subscription. Subscribers included a member of the hospital board of management, John Ross (1782–1849), who had emigrated from Golspie to Berbice. His money was generated by the colonized plantations, worked by indentured servants of British Guiana, now the independent nation of Guyana. Construction of the facility, which was designed by John Smith of Banff in the neoclassical style, began in 1799 and the building was opened in 1804.

A continuous three‑storey facade, designed by Matthews & Lawrie, was added in 1865 and an operating theatre extension, designed by Ross & Macbeth, jutting out of the front facade was added in 1898. A chapel, financed by Lady Tweedmouth in memory of her husband, Lord Tweedmouth, was also added in 1898 and a nurses' home was completed in 1899. It joined the National Health Service in 1948. After services transferred to a community hospital built in the grounds of the infirmary in 1999, the main building closed and was subsequently converted for use as the headquarters of the University of the Highlands and Islands.

In 2023, the University put the former Infirmary building up for sale. It was reported as under offer in November 2025.
