= Raigmore Hospital =

- NHS Highland
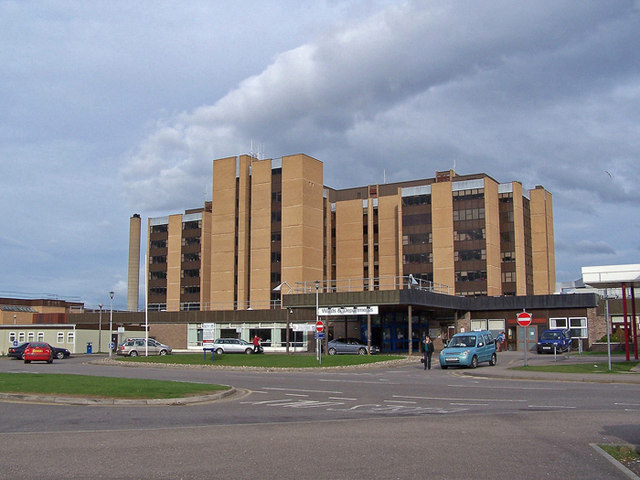
- The tower at Raigmore Hospital

- Shown in Inverness

Geography
- Location: Inverness, Highland, Scotland
- Coordinates: 57.4736°N 4.1930°W

Organisation
- Care system: NHS Scotland
- Type: Acute General
- Affiliated university: University of Aberdeen; University of Stirling

Services
- Emergency department: Yes
- Beds: 452

Helipads
- Helipad: Yes

History
- Founded: 1941 (original site); 1970 (current development)

Links
- Website: nhshighland.scot.nhs.uk/Services/Pages/RaigmoreHospital.aspx

Raigmore Hospital (Scottish Gaelic: Ospadal an Rathaig Mhòir) is a health facility located in Inverness, Scotland. It serves patients from the local area as well as providing specialist services to patients from across the Highland area. It is a teaching hospital, educating a range of healthcare professionals in association with the Universities of Aberdeen and Stirling. It is managed by NHS Highland.

== History ==
The Mackintosh family from Raigmore House were principle financial supporters of Infirmary in the Raigmore area in 19th century.

The hospital has its origins in a temporary facility which was built by James Campbell & Sons on part of the Raigmore House estate, as one of the seven new Emergency Hospital Service facilities, in 1941. The single storey wartime wards continued to be used for a further three decades, until the construction of the present buildings. A maternity facility was added in 1947 and the hospital joined the National Health Service in 1948.

In 1962 an announcement was made that a modern district general hospital would be provided at Raigmore. The new facilities were designed by J. Gleave & Partners and the first phase, which included radiology and radiotherapy, laboratory, out-patient services and medical departments, opened in 1970. A second phase, which included the main tower block with operating theatres, opened in 1985.

The hospital has progressively taken over the provision of some or all of the services previously performed by older hospitals in Inverness including Culduthel Hospital (closed 1989), Hilton Hospital (closed 1987) and the Royal Northern Infirmary (since 1999 the location of a newer Community hospital with the main building now used by the University of the Highlands and Islands).

In 2004 a new emergency department was constructed. In the General Medical Council's 2014 National Trainee Survey the department was rated highly by trainee doctors who had worked there.

The Wyvis Suite opened in 2007 following a £600,000 refurbishment project. It provided a new home for the re-located nurse-led pre-op assessment unit and the cardiac ultrasound service. These facilities had increased service capacity and allowed more direct and rapid access.

As part of a national replacement programme, the first of two new radiotherapy machines arrived in 2009.

An appeal had been launched in March 2011 to refurbish the Children's ward, but the £1m target was quickly reached so a decision was taken to extend the target and create a new unit. In June 2016 a new children's ward was opened with a 30-bed inpatient area.

In March 2016, £28m was put towards a three-year programme to upgrade the hospital's critical care areas and operating theatres.

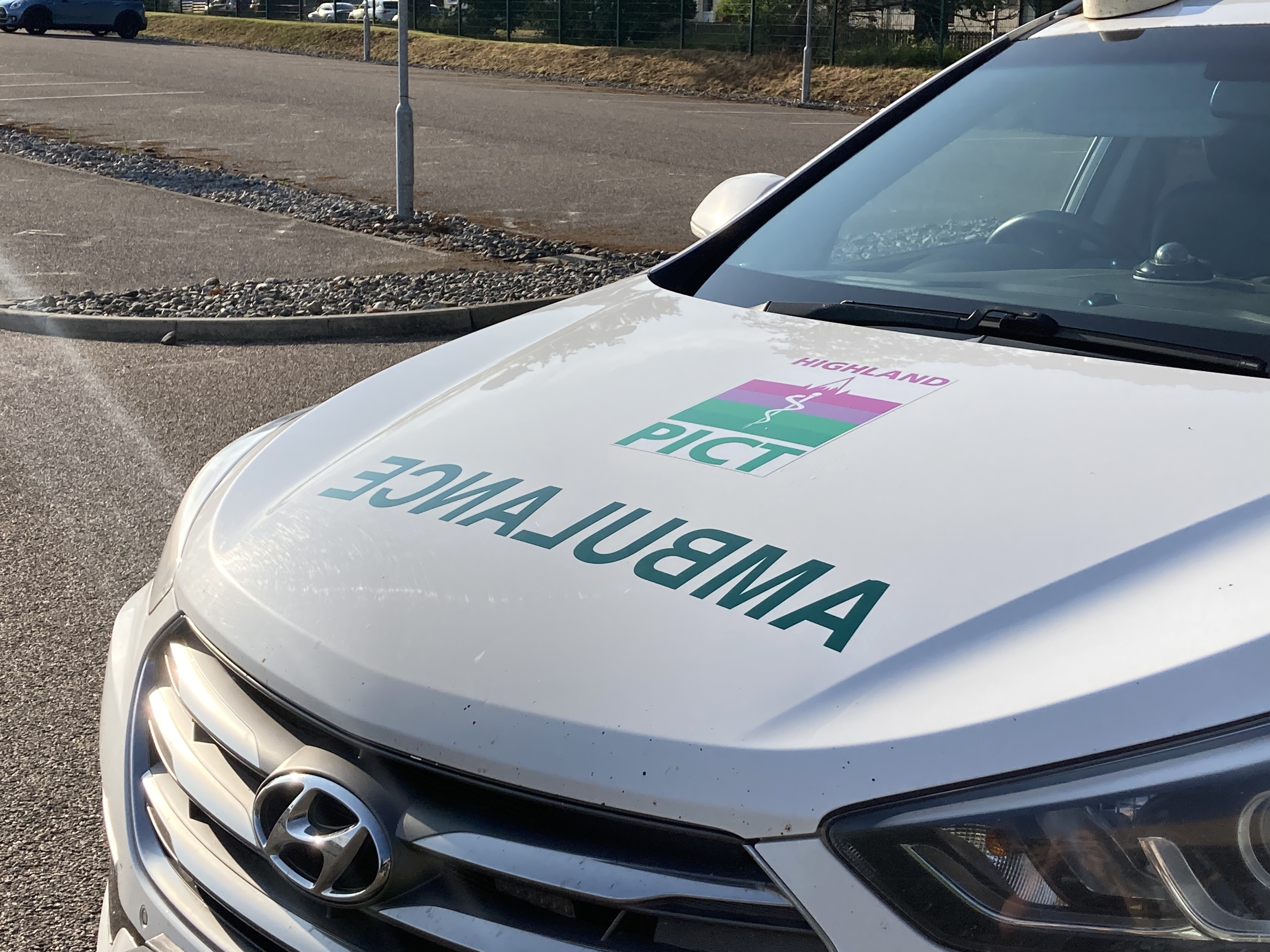
Scottish Ambulance Service response car used by the PICT Team

== Services ==
There are 452 beds in the hospital, mostly in the 8-storey tower building. The hospital has 9 operating theatres. In October 2014 the board agreed a £26m plan to refurbish the existing operating theatres and add a 10th.

=== Highland Pre-Hospital Immediate Care and Trauma Team ===
Raigmore hosts the award winning Highland PICT Team. This is a specialist prehospital response team based out of the Emergency Department and providing enhanced care across the Highlands. PICT currently operates 12 hours per day, seven days a week. They respond to around 150 patients a month, attending a range of 999 calls. The team utilise advanced interventions such as portable ultrasound to assess and treat casualties.

=== Specialist units ===
The hospital has a 30-bed Paediatric unit, where in-patient care in Medical Paediatrics; Oral Surgery, ENT (Ear, Nose and Throat) unit and Child and Family Psychiatry are based. Raigmore also contains a 57-bed maternity unit; specialist services such as cystic fibrosis, cardiology and rheumatology and the Birnie Child Development Centre for children with learning difficulties and special needs.

=== Baby-friendly hospital ===
Raigmore Hospital has approximately 2077 births per year and has full accreditation as baby friendly, since November 2005.

=== Admissions Lounge ===
In 2010 an Admissions Lounge was added, located on first floor of the tower. This is a pre-operative waiting area to accommodate patients coming in on the day of their planned surgery.

=== The infusion suite ===
In 2011 a new service began that allows patients to attend as outpatients to get medication through a drip. This meant that several patients could be getting treatment at the same time.

=== Citizens advice ===
The hospital has had its own onsite citizen's advice office since 2003.

== Associated charitable organisations ==
=== Maggie's Centre ===
A Maggie's Centre, Maggie's Highlands, (registered charity number: SC 024414) can also be found beside Raigmore Hospital. The building, which won the RIAS Andrew Doolan Award for Architecture in 2006, was designed by Scottish architectural firm Page\Park Architects and its gardens were designed by landscape architect and designer Charles Jencks. It was opened officially by the Scottish Health Minister, Andy Kerr, and Carol McGregor on 7 June 2005.

=== Inverness Hospital Radio ===
The hospital is served by the volunteer-run radio station, Inverness Hospital Radio, (registered charity number SC 007993) which has a studio located on the ground floor of the main building. They welcome requests and dedications for patients, and broadcast 7 days a week. The station has been in service since 2 November 1970 and received the Queen's Award for Voluntary Service in 2012.

=== Friends of Raigmore ===
The Friends of Raigmore (registered charity number SC 017742) are a group of volunteers who aim to improve hospital facilities for patients and staff.

== Notable patients ==
Labour Party politician Robin Cook (1946–2005) died there after suffering from hypertensive disease while on a two-week holiday in the Scottish Highlands with his wife Gaynor.
