= Cardrona railway station =

Disused railway station in Cardrona, Scottish Borders

Cardrona
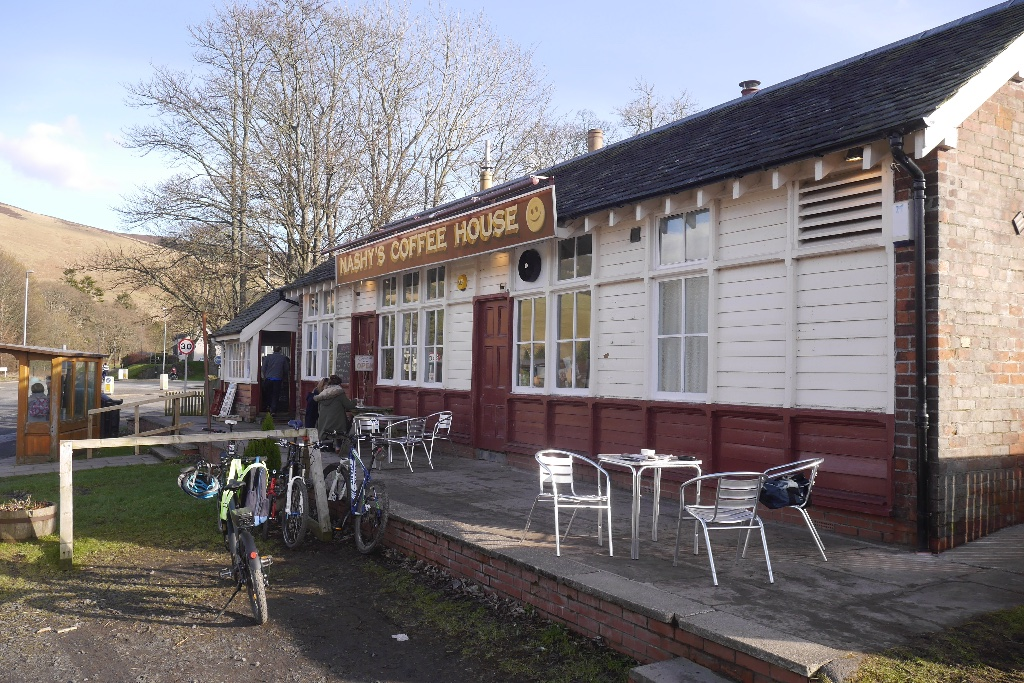
- The site of the station in 2016

General information
- Location: Cardrona, Scottish Borders; Scotland
- Coordinates: 55.64°N 3.1129°W
- Grid reference: NT300390
- Platforms: 1

Other information
- Status: Disused

History
- Original company: Peebles Railway
- Pre-grouping: North British Railway
- Post-grouping: LNER; British Rail (Scottish Region)

Key dates
- 1 October 1864: Opened
- 5 February 1962: Closed
Location

Cardrona railway station served the village of Cardrona, Scottish Borders, Scotland from 1864 to 1962 on the Peebles Railway.

== History ==
The station opened on 1 October 1864 by the Peebles Railway.

It was situated on the south side of an unnamed minor road with the station goods siding to the south.

A Board of Trade inspector visited the station prior to opening to say that the facilities needed improving. Nothing was done at the time but a new signal box was opened to the west end of the platform in 1895. This controlled access to the goods yard, which comprised one siding running behind the platform and a second short siding acting as a head shunt serving a short cattle dock. Cardrona was the only station beside Rosslynlee Hospital Halt on the line to survive until the closure of the line which was not fitted with totem name signs.

The station was host to a LNER camping coach from 1935 to 1939 and possibly one for some of 1934.

It closed to both passengers and goods traffic on 5 February 1962.

The station building is now used as a shop and the platform survives along with the signal box.

Preceding station	Disused railways	Following station
Peebles (West); Line and station closed	North British Railway; Peebles Railway	Innerleithen; Line and station closed
