= Peebles railway station =

Peebles railway station may refer to:

- Peebles railway station (1855) a former railway station in Peebles, Scotland built in 1855
- Peebles railway station (1864) a former railway station in Peebles, Scotland built in 1864
