= Midlothian Community Hospital =

- NHS Lothian
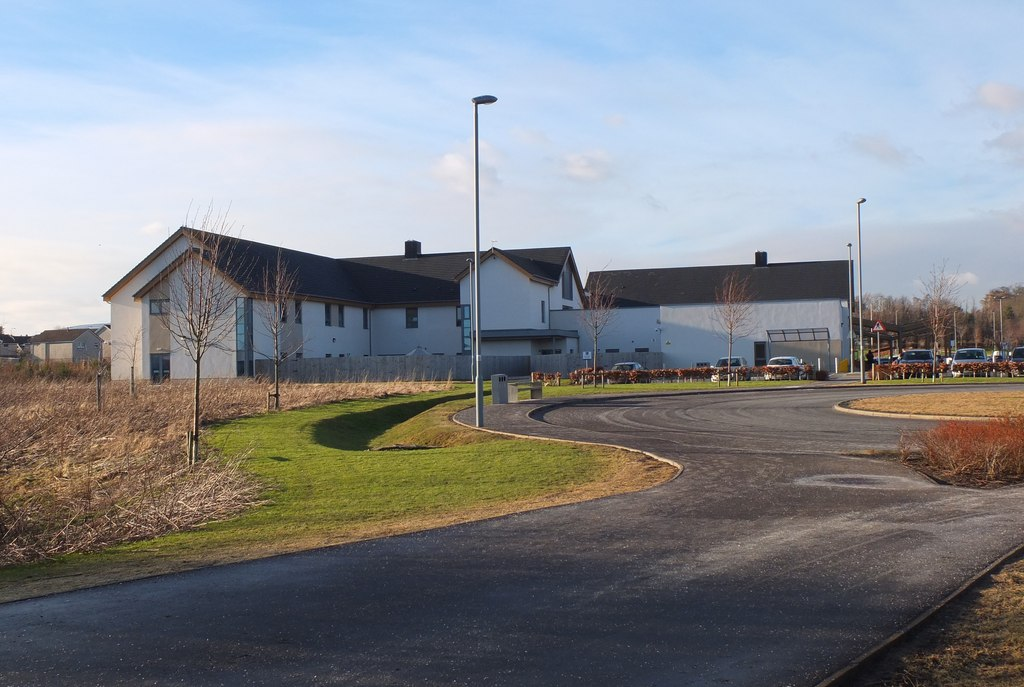
- Midlothian Community Hospital

- Shown in Midlothian

Geography
- Location: Bonnyrigg, Lothian, Scotland, United Kingdom
- Coordinates: 55.88018°N 3.09001°W

Organisation
- Care system: NHS Scotland
- Type: Community hospital

Services
- Emergency department: No Accident & Emergency
- Beds: 88

History
- Founded: 2010

Links
- Website: www.nhslothian.scot.nhs.uk/hospitals/mlch/
- Lists: Hospitals in Scotland

The Midlothian Community Hospital is a community hospital in Eskbank Road, Bonnyrigg, Scotland. It is managed by NHS Lothian.

== History ==
Plans for the hospital were announced in 2005, with the facility intended to replace the continuing care elements of Loanhead Hospital and Rosslynlee Hospital. It was built by Robertson Group and opened in September 2010.

== Services ==
The hospital has 88 staffed beds spread across 4 wards. Some 40 beds are allocated to care of the elderly and 48 for elderly people with mental health issues.
