= Rosslynlee railway station =

Disused railway station in Roslin, Midlothian

Rosslynlee
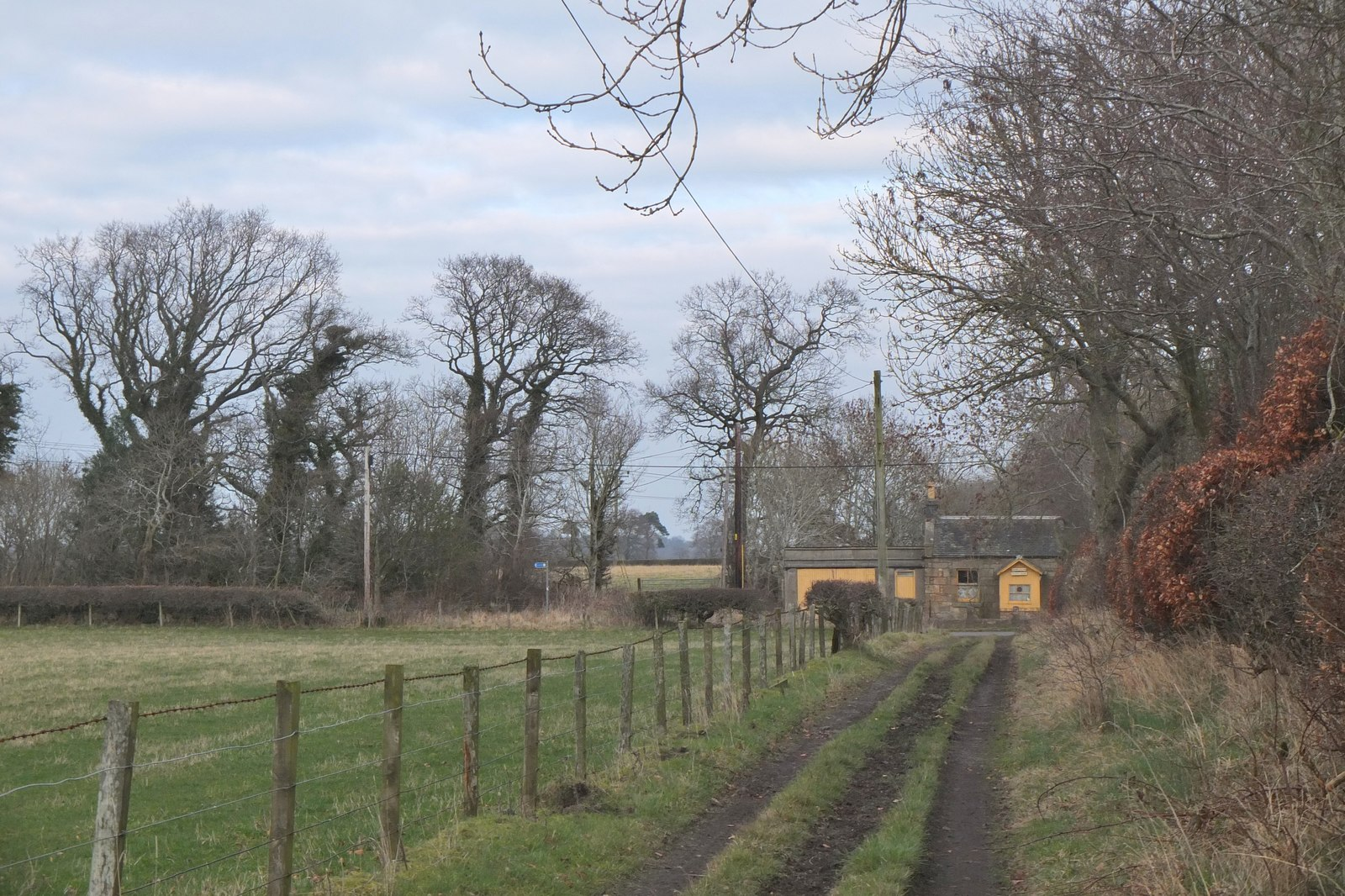
- The site of the station, looking towards the cottage, in 2019

General information
- Location: Roslin, Midlothian; Scotland
- Coordinates: 55.8438°N 3.1623°W
- Grid reference: NT273617
- Platforms: 1

Other information
- Status: Disused

History
- Original company: Peebles Railway
- Pre-grouping: North British Railway
- Post-grouping: LNER; British Rail (Scottish Region)

Key dates
- 4 July 1855: Opened as Roslin
- June 1864: Name changed to Rosslyn
- 2 September 1872: Name changed to Rosslynlee
- 1 January 1917: Closed as a wartime economy measure
- 2 June 1919: Reopened
- 5 February 1962: Closed completely
Location

Rosslynlee railway station served the village of Roslin, Midlothian, Scotland from 1855 to 1962 on the Peebles Railway.

== History ==
The station opened on 4 July 1855 by the Peebles Railway. The station was situated on the north side of an unnamed minor road. The station was originally planned to be named Kirkstall, but it was named Roslin. It was renamed Rosslyn in June 1864 and finally renamed Rosslynlee on 2 September 1872 to avoid confusion with the station of the same name. There was a small goods yard behind the single platform, which consisted of one siding running into a dock. This closed on 3 August 1959 although a private siding remained in use after that. The station was closed to both passengers and goods traffic on 5 February 1962.

| Preceding station | Disused railways | Following station |
|---|---|---|
| Rosewell and Hawthornden; Line and station closed | North British Railway; Peebles Railway | Rosslynlee Hospital Halt; Line and station closed |
