= University Hospital of North Durham =

- County Durham and Darlington NHS Foundation Trust
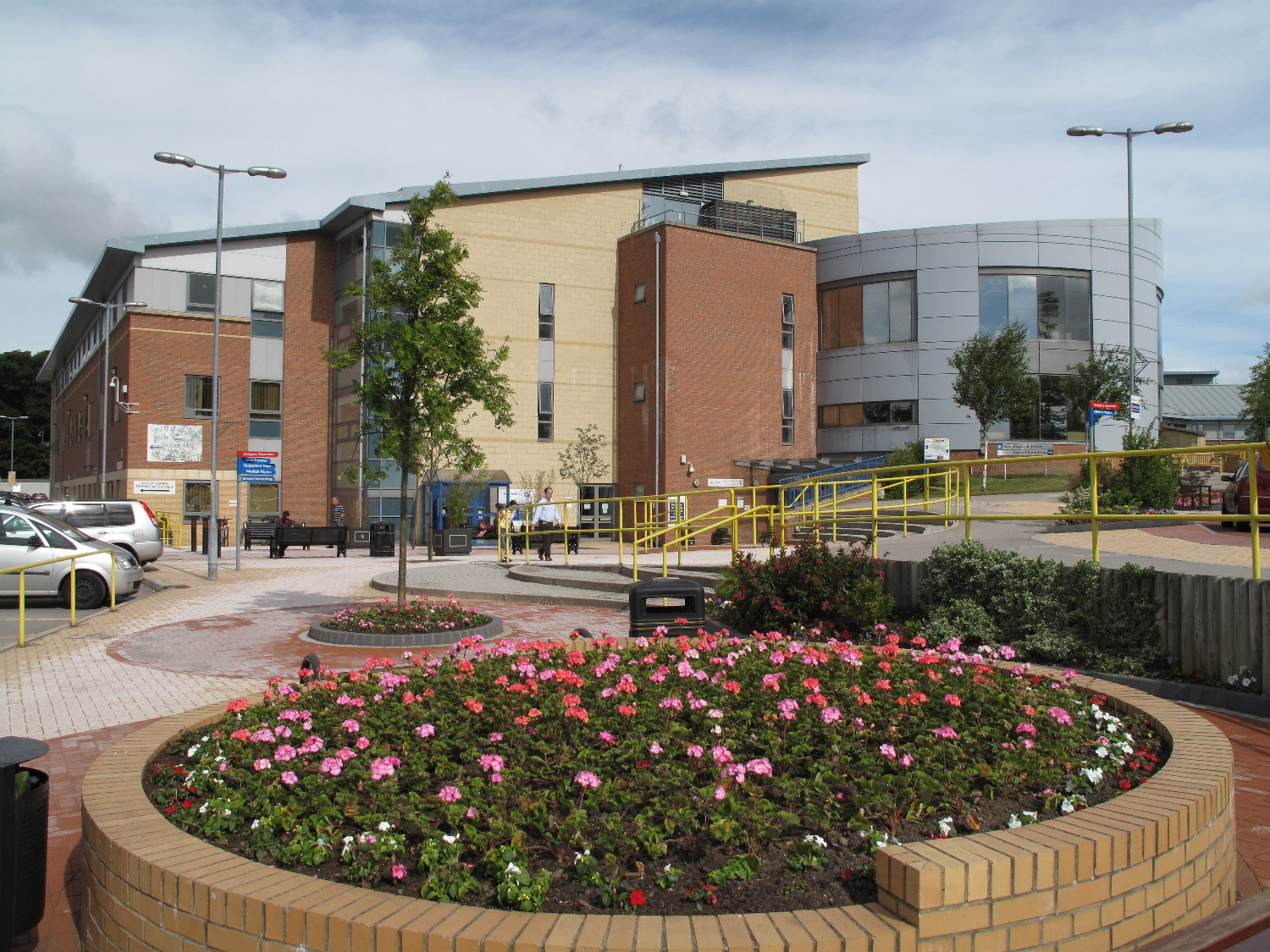
- University Hospital of North Durham

- Shown in County Durham

Geography
- Location: Durham, England
- Coordinates: 54.78930°N 1.59339°W

Organisation
- Care system: NHS
- Type: District General
- Affiliated university: Newcastle University Medical School

Services
- Emergency department: Yes
- Beds: 528

History
- Founded: 2001

Links
- Website: University Hospital of North Durham at cddft.nhs.uk
- Lists: Hospitals in England

University Hospital of North Durham is an acute care hospital built to replace the older Dryburn Hospital on the same site. It is managed by the County Durham and Darlington NHS Foundation Trust.

== History ==
The hospital has its origins in the Dryburn Emergency Hospital which was established at Dryburn Hall, the former home of William Lloyd Wharton, in 1940, during the Second World War. After the war, the establishment was expanded into a civilian facility known as Dryburn Hospital.

A new hospital was procured under a Private Finance Initiative contract which was awarded to a consortium of Balfour Beatty and the Royal Bank of Scotland in 1998. It was built by Balfour Beatty with an initial cost of £87 million and opened in 2001. Facilities management services were provided by Engie. Balfour Beatty subsequently sold their stake to Dalmore Capital in 2014.

== Services provided ==
The main hospital building contains the vast majority of the hospitals departments. It has a basement for pathology and pharmacy and three other floors, each consisting of a long main corridor with wards and departments on both sides. Most of the wards consist of four single beds in each room, as well as side rooms. A few buildings from the original "Dryburn Hospital" remain in operation. These buildings include Dryburn House which is used as the hospital doctor's residence.

The hospital works in partnership with Bishop Auckland Hospital and Darlington Memorial Hospital. Cases relating to some of the departments not present in the University Hospital of North Durham (e.g. neurosurgery) are referred to the other hospitals for management.

== 2014 report and response ==
In 2014 a BBC report identified that "out of 126 serious incidents when patients were delayed admission to hospitals for more than two hours, 71 happened at the University Hospital of North Durham". The hospital trust subsequently announced they had earmarked £5.6million to invest into the emergency departments at Darlington Memorial Hospital and University Hospital of North Durham.

That focus has resulted in improved patient perceptions but a 2015 Care Quality Commission assessment of the County Durham and Darlington NHS Foundation Trust resulted in an overall "Requires Improvement" rating.

A subsequent inspection undertaken in July 2019 and published the following December raised this rating to "Good".

== See also ==
- List of hospitals in England
