= Pomathorn Halt railway station =

Disused railway station in Penicuik, Midlothian

Pomathorn Halt

General information
- Location: Penicuik, Midlothian; Scotland
- Coordinates: 55.821°N 3.2105°W
- Grid reference: NT242593
- Platforms: 1

Other information
- Status: Disused

History
- Original company: Peebles Railway
- Pre-grouping: North British Railway
- Post-grouping: LNER; British Rail (Scottish Region)

Key dates
- 4 July 1855: Opened as Penicuik
- 2 December 1872: Name changed to Pomathorn
- 7 July 1947: Suffix 'Halt' added to its name
- 5 February 1962: Closed
Location

Pomathorn Halt railway station served the town of Penicuik, Midlothian, Scotland from 1855 to 1962 on the Peebles Railway.

== History ==
The station opened on 4 July 1855 by the Peebles Railway. The station was situated on the north side of the B6372. The station was originally called Penicuik, but it was renamed Pomathorn on 2 December 1872, although the station signs always called it 'Pomathorn for Penicuik'. The goods yard was accessed from the north and consisted of three sidings, two of which served a cattle dock. The station was downgraded to an unstaffed halt on 1 November 1946 and the suffix 'halt' was added to its name on 7 July 1947, although it didn't appear on tickets or signs, just the timetables.

Following the closure of Penicuik station in September 1951 - terminus of the Penicuik railway, half a mile nearer the centre of town - Pomathorn became Penicuik's only station. It closed to passengers and goods traffic on 5 February 1962.

Preceding station	Disused railways	Following station
Rosslynlee Hospital Halt; Line and station closed	North British Railway; Peebles Railway	Leadburn; Line and station closed
