= Eastbank Hospital =

- NHS Orkney
- Shown in Orkney

Geography
- Location: East Road, Kirkwall, Orkney, Scotland, United Kingdom
- Coordinates: 58.9844°N 2.9487°W

Organisation
- Care system: NHS Scotland
- Type: Geriatric

Services
- Emergency department: No

History
- Founded: 1937
- Closed: 2000

Eastbank Hospital was a health facility in Kirkwall, capital of the Orkney Islands. The hospital was managed by NHS Scotland until its closure in March 2000.

== History ==
Eastbank Hospital opened in 1937, in a Georgian style house on East Road, East Kirkwall. The house, known as Eastbank House, was purchased by Mr. Ferguson who converted it into an infectious diseases hospital, to replace the former Scapa Infectious Diseases Hospital at Scapa. Over time, the hospital had to adapt to meet the needs of patients who were recovering from alcoholism, had mental illnesses, or elderly patients who suffered from dementia. As the amount of patients at Eastbank increased, the hospital was extended rapidly in the 1960s in order to accommodate them.

In December 1977, Eastbank House was listed as a category C listed building by Historic Scotland.

== Closure ==
In March 2000, the Macmillan House ward was moved to the larger Balfour Hospital in South Kirkwall, which made Eastbank Hospital redundant, and a decision was taken by NHS Scotland to shut Eastbank Hospital that same year, despite protests about the facility's closure and the moving of patients to Balfour Hospital. After the closure of the hospital, several of the buildings were sold off and became housing. Eastbank House became a hostel, and the 1960s developments became a Christian Growth Centre and youth centre for East Kirkwall, known as The Life Centre.
