= Shotley Bridge Hospital =

- County Durham and Darlington NHS Foundation Trust
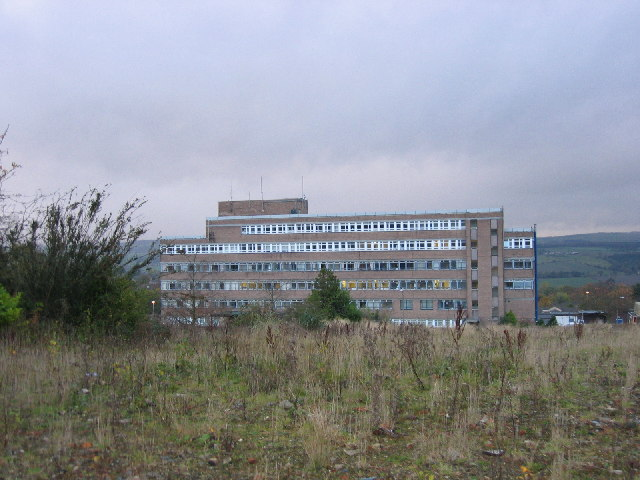
- Shotley Bridge Hospital

Geography
- Location: Shotley Bridge, County Durham, England
- Coordinates: 54.8692°N 1.8426°W

Organisation
- Care system: National Health Service
- Type: Community

History
- Founded: 1912

Links
- Website: www.cddft.nhs.uk

Shotley Bridge Hospital is a healthcare facility in Shotley Bridge, County Durham, England. It is managed by the County Durham and Darlington NHS Foundation Trust.

== History ==
The hospital originated with the acquisition of the Whinney House Estate in 1912. The facility, which was originally designed by Newcombe and Newcombe as a tuberculosis hospital, opened in 1912. It became a mental health facility known as the Shotley Bridge Mental Defectives Colony in 1927. It served as the Shotley Bridge Emergency Hospital during the Second World War specialising in plastic surgery, before joining the National Health Service as Shotley Bridge General Hospital in 1948. Although it was once one of the largest hospitals in the Northern Region, most primary care and acute services were transferred to the new University Hospital of North Durham in 2001. After this, most of the earlier buildings were demolished and it became a community hospital. In April 2019 the trust announced a consultation on the possible transfer of clinical services to a smaller medical centre.
