= Earlyvale Gate railway station =

Disused railway station in Earlyvale, Scottish Borders

Earlyvale Gate

General information
- Location: Earlyvale, Scottish Borders; Scotland
- Coordinates: 55.743775°N 3.208241°W
- Grid reference: NT242507

Other information
- Status: Disused

History
- Original company: Peebles Railway

Key dates
- June 1856: Opened
- 28 February 1857: Closed
Location

Earlyvale Gate railway station served the Dundas family residence in Earlyvale, Scottish Borders, Scotland for 8 months (June 1856 - February 1857) on the Peebles Railway.

== History ==
The station opened in June 1856 by the Peebles Railway. The station was situated on the west side of an unnamed minor road. James Hay Mackenzie, son of the Peebles Railway director William Forbes Mackenzie, He wrote to the PR board on behalf of a friend, George Dundas, who was planning to move his family into a house at Earlyvale Gate. In his request, he asked that trains be made to stop at the level crossing for the Dundas family’s use, proposing either the construction of a station or the provision of morning and evening stops. In return, Dundas promised to generate goods traffic on the line through his family and associates.

The PR board declined to build a station for a single household but agreed to have trains stop at the crossing in the morning and evening, on the condition that William purchase a season ticket. Eddleston to Edinburgh. Arrangements were made to stop the trains on Tuesday, Wednesday and Thursday (the market days). Any passengers had to inform the gatekeeper at Earlyvale so they could hoist the red stop signal and returning passengers had to notify the guard at Leadburn. The station was closed to passengers on 28 February 1857.

Preceding station	Disused railways	Following station
Leadburn; Line and station closed	North British Railway; Peebles Railway	Eddleston; Line and station closed
