= Chester Hospital =

Chester Hospital may refer to:

- Countess of Chester Hospital, Chester, Cheshire, England
- Chester-le-Street Hospital, County Durham, England
- West Chester Hospital, Cincinnati, Ohio, United States
- Crozer-Chester Medical Center, Upland, Pennsylvania, United States
- Chester County Hospital, West Chester, Pennsylvania, United States, part of the University of Pennsylvania Health System
