= St George's Park =

St George's Park may refer to:

- St George's Park, Bristol, a park in Bristol, England
- St George's Park, Gqeberha, a multi-use park in Gqeberha, South Africa
  - St George's Park Cricket Ground, the cricket ground at the park, sometimes called Crusaders Ground
- St George's Park, Morpeth, a mental health facility in Northumberland
- St Georges Park (Newport), an association football stadium on the Isle of Wight
- St. George Island State Park, a state park in Florida
- St George's Park National Football Centre, Burton
