= Leadburn railway station =

Disused railway station in Leadburn, Midlothian

Leadburn
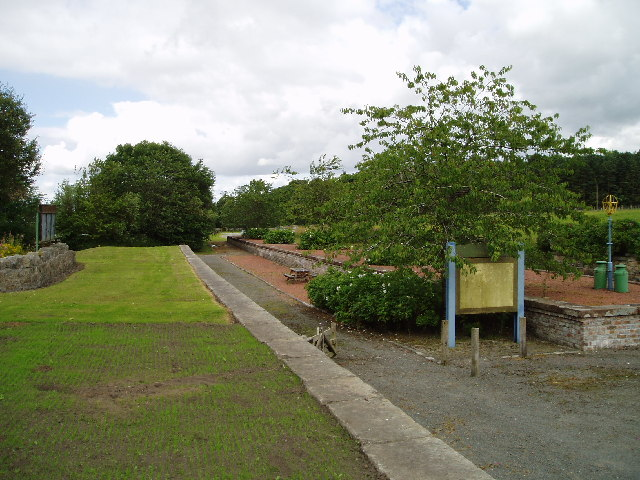
- Station site, 2005

General information
- Location: Leadburn, Midlothian; Scotland
- Coordinates: 55.7868°N 3.2204°W
- Grid reference: NT235555
- Platforms: 2

Other information
- Status: Disused

History
- Original company: Peebles Railway
- Pre-grouping: North British Railway
- Post-grouping: LNER; British Rail (Scottish Region)

Key dates
- 4 July 1855: Opened
- 7 March 1955: Closed to passengers
- 5 February 1962: Closed completely
Location

Leadburn railway station served the hamlet of Leadburn, Midlothian, Scotland from 1855 to 1962 on the Peebles Railway.

== History ==
The station opened on 4 July 1855 by the Peebles Railway. The station was situated on the south side of the A6094 east of its junction with A701 and A703. There was a siding running behind the up platform but the goods yard was on the north side of the down platform and consisted of two sidings, both of which served a small goods dock. After the Dolphinton branch closed in April 1933, the lines used in the bay platforms were converted into two additional goods sidings. The station closed to passengers on 7 March 1955 and remained open to goods traffic until the closure of the line on 5 February 1962.

Preceding station	Disused railways	Following station
Pomathorn Halt; Line and station closed	North British Railway; Peebles Railway	Earlyvale Gate; Line and station closed
