= Rosslynlee Hospital Halt railway station =

Railway station in Midlothian, Scotland

Rosslynlee Hospital Halt

General information
- Location: Roslin, Midlothian; Scotland
- Coordinates: 55.8359°N 3.1766°W
- Grid reference: NT264609
- Platforms: 1

Other information
- Status: Disused

History
- Original company: British Railways (Scottish Region)

Key dates
- 11 December 1958: Opened
- 5 February 1962: Closed
Location

Rosslynlee Hospital Halt railway station that served Rosslynlee Hospital, Midlothian, Scotland from 1958 to 1962 on the Peebles Railway.

== History ==
The station opened on 11 December 1958 by British Railways. The station was situated in the north west corner of Rosslynlee Hospital grounds. This was one of several attempts in Scotland to serve line-side institutions with new diesel trains; most of them were very short lived. The halt was only open for three years and was cheaply constructed. The halt was made possible by a collaboration between the Scottish Region of British Railways and the Board of Management of the Royal Edinburgh Hospital. The hospital staff were responsible for the lighting, the house steward sold tickets from the office and the station master of Rosewell and Hawthornden visited twice a week to collect money from ticket sales. There was one siding which took deliveries of coal from the internal gasworks. The station was closed to passengers on 5 February 1962.

Preceding station	Historical railways	Following station
Rosslynlee; Line and station closed	North British Railway; Peebles Railway	Pomathorn Halt; Line and station closed
