= Innerleithen railway station =

Disused railway station in Innerleithen, Scottish Borders

Innerleithen
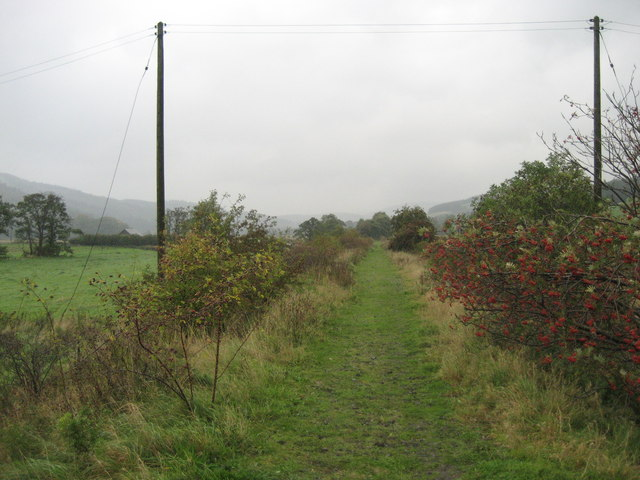
- The site of the station in 2006

General information
- Location: Innerleithen, Scottish Borders; Scotland
- Coordinates: 55.6157°N 3.0625°W
- Grid reference: NT331363
- Platforms: 2

Other information
- Status: Disused

History
- Original company: Peebles Railway
- Pre-grouping: North British Railway
- Post-grouping: LNER; British Rail (Scottish Region)

Key dates
- 1 October 1864: Opened
- 5 February 1962: Closed
Location

Innerleithen railway station served the town of Innerleithen, Scottish Borders, Scotland from 1864 to 1962 on the Peebles Railway.

== History ==
The station opened on 1 October 1864 by the Peebles Railway. The station was situated on the east side of Traquair Road on the B709. This station was the terminus for two years until the line was extended to Galashiels on 18 June 1866. The moderate sized goods yard consisted of four sidings and a loop giving access from both directions. One of the sidings passed a cattle dock and ran into a brick-built good shed. There were pens in the northwest corner of the yard. There were three further short sidings on the down side of the line. The station initially had one platform, but a second was built in the early 19th century. Some changes were made to the goods yard, including the loop being removed and relaid as a siding running behind the up platform and access was only from the east. Waverley Mills was provided with a private siding from the goods yard. The station was closed to both passengers and goods traffic on 5 February 1962.

Preceding station	Disused railways	Following station
Cardrona; Line and station closed	North British Railway; Peebles Railway	Walkerburn; Line and station closed
