= Bonnyrigg railway station =

Disused railway station in Bonnyrigg, Midlothian

Bonnyrigg
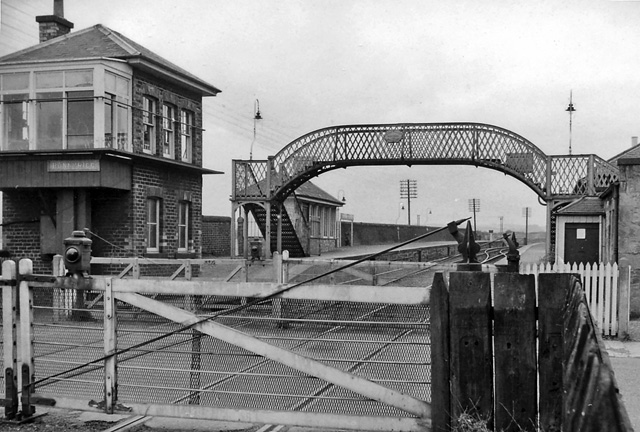
- The site of Bonnyrigg station on 10 September 1962

General information
- Location: Bonnyrigg, Midlothian; Scotland
- Coordinates: 55.8728°N 3.1019°W
- Grid reference: NT311649
- Platforms: 2

Other information
- Status: Disused

History
- Original company: Peebles Railway
- Pre-grouping: North British Railway
- Post-grouping: LNER; British Rail (Scottish Region)

Key dates
- 1 August 1855: Opened
- December 1866: Name changed to Bonnyrigg Road
- 1 August 1868: Name reverted to Bonnyrigg
- 10 September 1962: Closed to passengers
- 25 January 1965: Closed completely
Location

Bonnyrigg railway station was a railway station that served the town of Bonnyrigg, Midlothian, Scotland from 1855 to 1965 on the Peebles Railway.

== History ==
The station opened on 1 August 1855 by the Peebles Railway. It was situated on the south side of Dundas Street on the B704. The station's name was changed to Bonnyrigg Road in December 1866 to avoid confusion, but it was changed back to Bonnyrigg on 1 August 1868 due to more confusion being caused. Originally, the goods yard had one siding but in the early 20th century a second siding was added which served a cattle dock and a goods shed was added. A third siding ran end on to the dock. Polton Colliery was to the south of the station and opened in the mid 19th century. It was served by Polton number 2 colliery siding. The station was closed to passengers on 10 September 1962 but the goods yard remained open, which means that the station was downgraded to an unstaffed public deliver siding. The goods yard was closed on 25 January 1965.

Preceding station	Disused railways	Following station
Eskbank and Dalkeith; Line open, station closed	North British Railway; Peebles Railway	Rosewell and Hawthornden; Line and station closed
