= Eddleston railway station =

Disused railway station in Eddleston, Scottish Borders

Eddleston
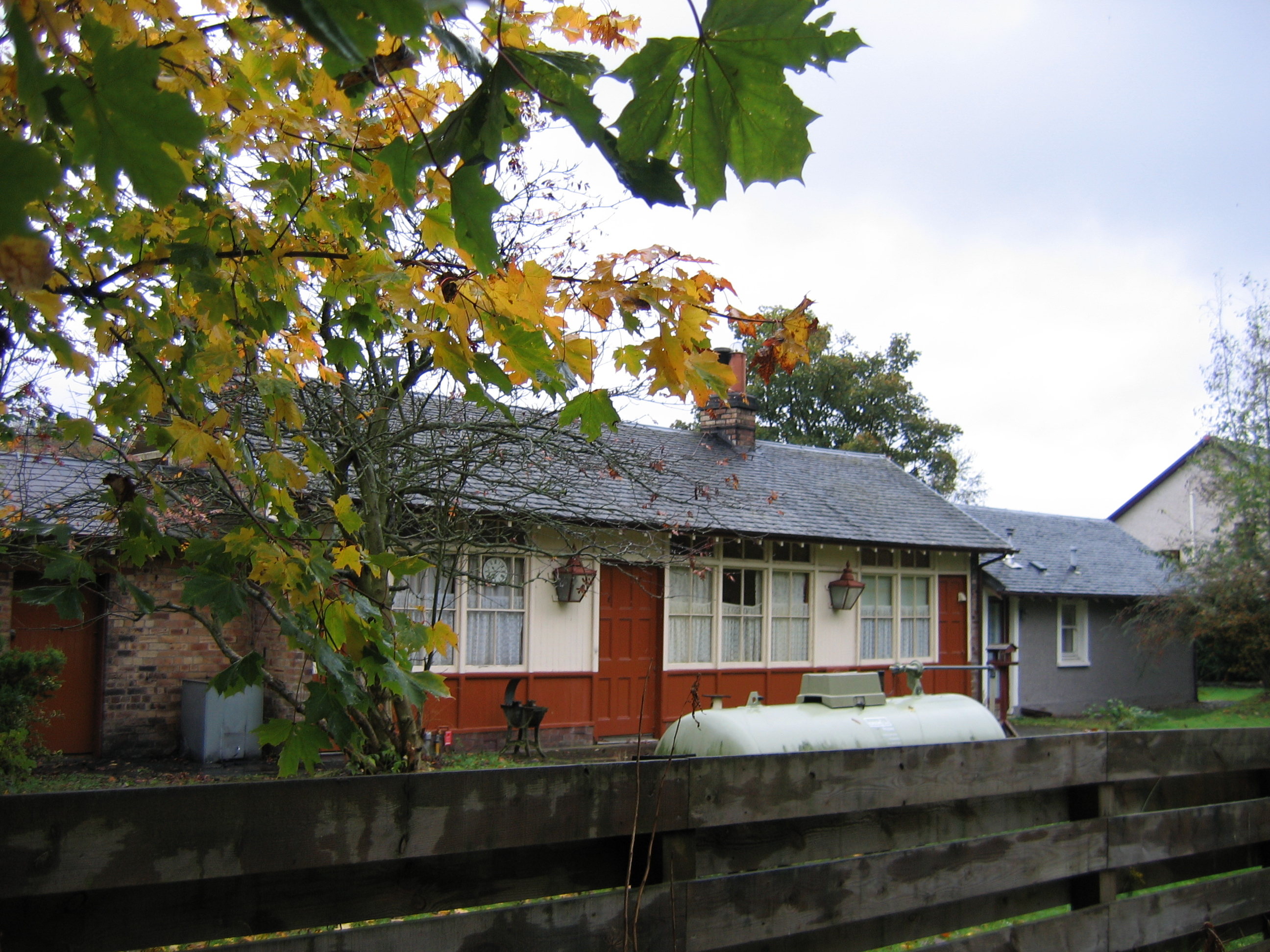
- The station building in 2005

General information
- Location: Eddleston, Scottish Borders; Scotland
- Coordinates: 55.7111°N 3.2095°W
- Grid reference: NT241470
- Platforms: 2

Other information
- Status: Disused

History
- Original company: Peebles Railway
- Pre-grouping: North British Railway
- Post-grouping: LNER; British Rail (Scottish Region)

Key dates
- 4 July 1855: Opened
- 5 February 1962: Closed

Eddleston railway station served the village of Eddleston, Scottish Borders, Scotland from 1855 to 1962 on the Peebles Railway.

== History ==
The station was opened on 4 July 1855 by the Peebles Railway. It was situated on the west side of Station Road. Initially, it had one platform but another was built along with a passing loop in the 1890s. The goods yard was small, behind the up platform and had two sidings, one serving a dock. A Camping coach was noticed standing in the goods yard in the 1930s. By this time, the down platform was taken out of use, the passing loop was lifted and the signal box was demolished. The station still remained open to passengers and goods traffic until the closure of the line on 5 February 1962.

Preceding station	Disused railways	Following station
Earlyvale Gate; Line and station closed	North British Railway; Peebles Railway	Peebles (Old) (After 1864) Line and station closed
Earlyvale Gate; Line and station closed	North British Railway; Peebles Railway	Peebles (New) (Until 1864) Line and station closed
