= St George's Hospital, Morpeth =

St George's Hospital
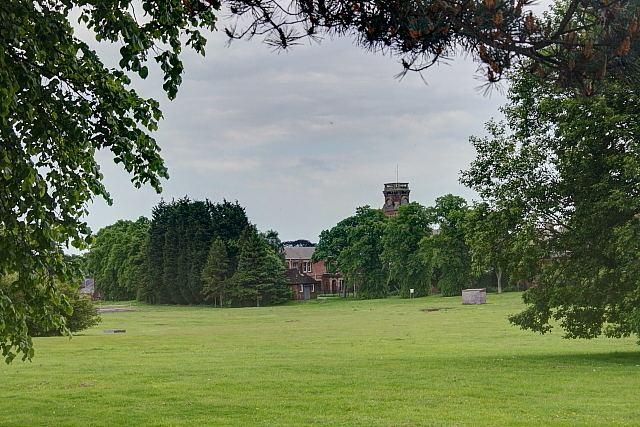
- St George's Hospital

- Shown in Northumberland

Geography
- Location: Morpeth, Northumberland, England
- Coordinates: 55.1762°N 1.6838°W

Organisation
- Care system: NHS
- Type: Specialist

Services
- Speciality: Mental health

History
- Founded: 1859
- Closed: 2006

Links
- Lists: Hospitals in England

St George's Hospital was a mental health facility in Morpeth, Northumberland.

== History ==
The facility was designed by Henry Welch, the County Surveyor of Northumberland, using a corridor plan layout and opened as the Northumberland County Pauper Lunatic Asylum on 16 March 1859. It was extended in the 1880s and three villas were added in the 1890s, before it was renamed St George's Hospital in the 1930s.

A German Luftwaffe bomber crash landed in the hospital grounds in 1942 during the Second World War.

The hospital joined the National Health Service in 1948. After the introduction of Care in the Community in the early 1980s, the hospital went into a period of decline and closed in 2006. Many of the old buildings have been demolished and the site has been developed for residential use as "Saint George".

Meanwhile, a small modern health facility, which was named St George's Park was built slightly to the north of the old hospital.
