= Balfour Hospital =

- NHS Orkney
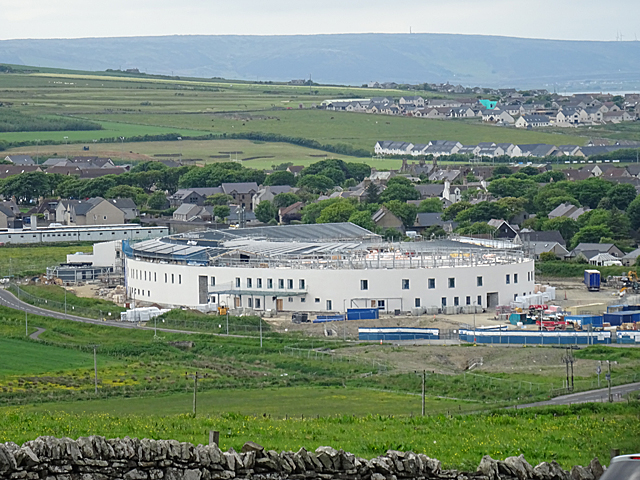
- The new hospital under construction

- Shown in Orkney

Geography
- Location: Kirkwall, Orkney, Scotland, United Kingdom
- Coordinates: 58.9756°N 2.9644°W

Organisation
- Care system: NHS Scotland
- Type: General
- Affiliated university: University of Aberdeen; Robert Gordon University

Services
- Emergency department: Yes
- Beds: 49

History
- Founded: 1845

Links
- Website: www.ohb.scot.nhs.uk/service/hospital-services

Balfour Hospital is a rural general hospital in Kirkwall, Orkney. It is managed by NHS Orkney.

== History ==
In 1836, John Balfour of Trenabie set up a charitable trust for the founding of a hospital with the interest from £20,000 worth of Mexican government bonds. In 1845, the trustees of the hospital fund bought the house from local merchant, James Shearer, together with the two large gardens and blacksmith's shop on the west side of the street, for £450. At first known simply as the Orkney Hospital, it became the Balfour Hospital in 1853, in recognition of the contribution of the Balfour family. This building is now the Kirkwall West End Hotel.

A new purpose built hospital in New Scapa Road in Kirkwall opened in 1927. A Macmillan House ward for cancer patients had opened at the Eastbank Hospital in 1993; this was replaced by a Macmillan House ward in the Balfour Hospital in March 2000.

The Groundwater Suite opened in 2011, bringing a new operating theatre, a sterilising department, and new x-ray unit to the Balfour hospital. This £5 million development was named after Bill Groundwater, a distinguished former surgeon from the islands.

A new purpose built hospital designed by Keppie Design and built by Robertson Group at a cost of £65 million opened in July 2019. It is first hospital in the UK built to a net-zero standard, which means the running of the building does not contribute to carbon emissions. It has a fully-electric energy centre with air-to-water heat pumps generating all hot water and electricity, solar panels on the roof and back-up oil generators in case of emergency.

== Services ==
Balfour Hospital has 48 beds in six wards, a day hospital and a day-surgery unit. There are currently approximately 136 births a year at the maternity unit and it has full accreditation as baby friendly, since July 2014. The high dependency unit was closed in November 2022 due to “staffing challenges”.

== Performance ==
In 2013, hospital mortality figures were the worst in Scotland with a higher than expected death rate in 23 of the last 27 quarters, resulting in 128 more deaths than expected, but the small numbers involved mean that little reliance can be placed on the figures.
