= County Durham and Darlington NHS Foundation Trust =

Healthcare trust in England

- Former name: County Durham and Darlington Acute Hospitals NHS Trust
- Type: NHS foundation trust
- Established: 1 February 2007
- Headquarters: Hollyhurst Road; Darlington; DL3 6HX
- Budget: £638 million (operating expenses in 2022/23)
- Hospitals: Bishop Auckland Hospital; Chester-le-Street Hospital; Darlington Memorial Hospital; Shotley Bridge Hospital; University Hospital of North Durham
- Staff: 7,294 (2022/23)
- Website: www.cddft.nhs.uk

County Durham and Darlington NHS Foundation Trust (CDDFT) is an NHS Foundation Trust based in North East England. It runs two acute hospitals in University Hospital of North Durham and Darlington Memorial Hospital as well as further non-acute centres at Shotley Bridge Hospital, Sedgefield Community Hospital, Richardson Community Hospital, Weardale Community Hospital, Bishop Auckland Hospital and Chester-le-Street Hospital. The Chief Executive is Sue Jacques. The most recent review of the Trust by the Care Quality Commission in 2019 provided an "Overall: Good" rating.

== History ==
On 1 October 2002, South Durham Health Care NHS Trust merged with North Durham Health Care NHS Trust to form a new Trust, County Durham and Darlington Acute Hospitals NHS Trust (CDDAH), in order to solve capacity problems. CDDAH applied for foundation trust status in June 2006 to gain more control of finances and services. Its application was approved and it became County Durham and Darlington NHS Foundation Trust in February 2007.

In 2015 the trust established a subsidiary company, Synchronicity Care Ltd. The intention was to achieve VAT benefits, as well as pay bill savings, by recruiting new staff on less expensive non-NHS contracts. VAT benefits arise because NHS trusts can only claim VAT back on a small subset of goods and services they buy. The Value Added Tax Act 1994 provides a mechanism through which NHS trusts can qualify for refunds on contracted out services.

In 2018 it made a 14-year managed service agreement with Philips to run imaging and cardiology services across four sites.

== Performance ==
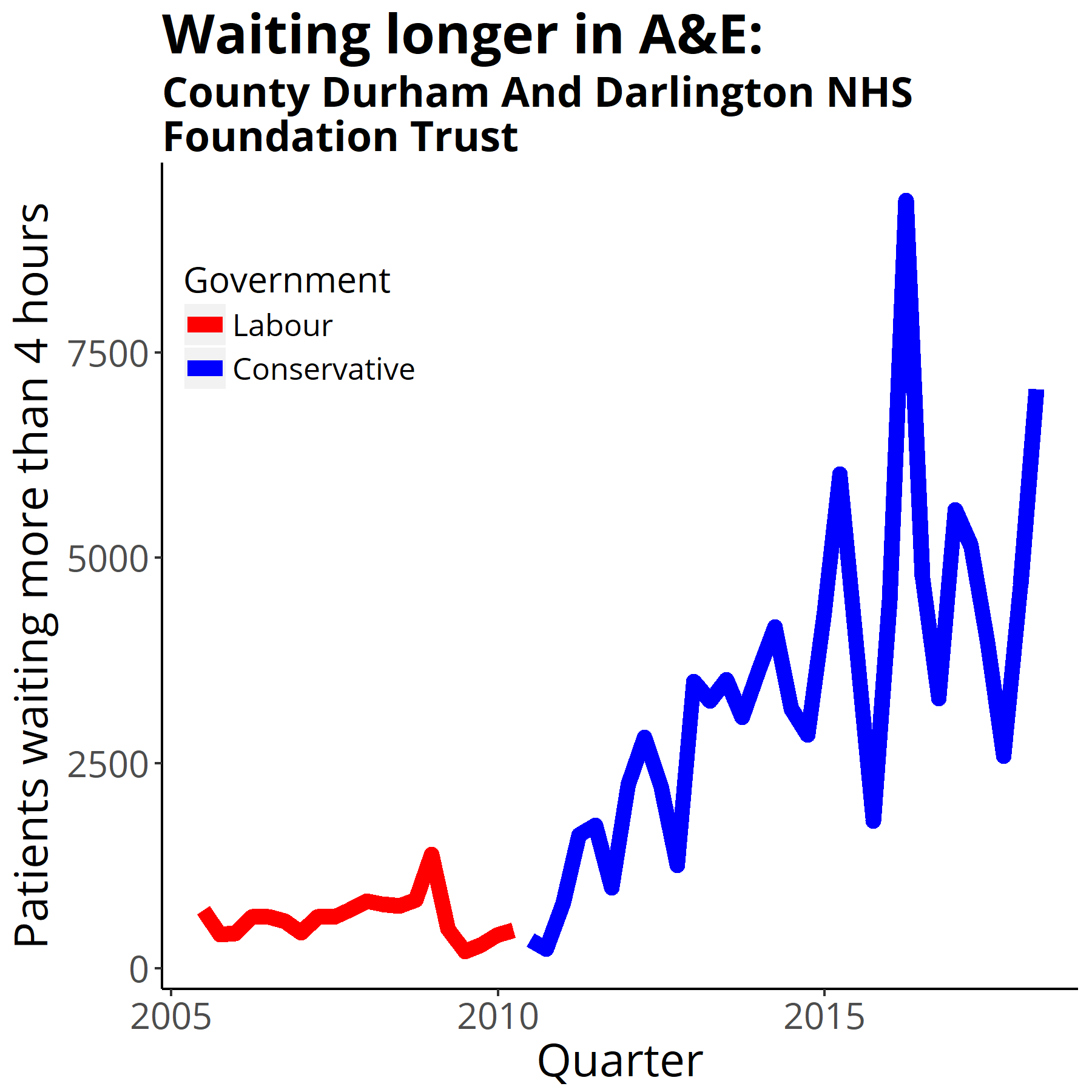
Four-hour target in the emergency department quarterly figures from NHS England Data from https://www.england.nhs.uk/statistics/statistical-work-areas/ae-waiting-times-and-activity/

The Trust logged 1570 breaches of the 30 minute handover rule from ambulances to its A&E department during 2013 as well as 360 breaches of the 60 minute target, triggering fines of £674,000.

A Care Quality Commission survey found that the Trust was among the best in England for its maternity services in December 2013. A subsequent review by the CQC noted that "People were not being protected from the risks of unsafe or inappropriate care and treatment because accurate and appropriate records were not always being maintained."

From September 2017 all referrals to the trust are made electronically using the NHS e-Referral Service. This has reduced the rate of patients missing appointments from 10% to 5%.

== Research ==
The Trust set up trial of a digital self-testing service for patients using Warfarin in 2013. They are given a Roche CoaguChek XS monitor and testing strips. This gives a reading of their international normalised ratio, a measure of how quickly blood clots – which they can share with clinic staff via an automated phone call. The software which drives the automated process is produced by Inhealthcare Ltd. The 200 patients on the trial improved the time they were in therapeutic range from 60% of the time to 75% which reduces the risk of complications. They no longer have to come to the hospital every two weeks and are less likely to be admitted. Patients are enthusiastic about the benefits.

It set up an artificial intelligence model using risk stratification digital tools to protect patients from acute kidney injury in 2021. Hospital-acquired acute kidney injury fell by more than 80%. This saved the trust more than £2 million in direct costs.

== Finances ==
In the financial year 2022-23, the trust had £656 million in operating income and operating expenses of £638 million. As of June 2019, CDDFT has three ongoing private finance initiative (PFI) contracts, which were used to build University Hospital of North Durham (UHND), Chester le Street Community Hospital (CLS), and Bishop Auckland Hospital (BAH). They were taken out in March 1998, May 2002, and May 1999 and borrowed £92.6 million, £13.2 million, and £49.9 million, respectively. All the contracts have an ending date 30 years from signing.

== Education ==
The trust currently hosts medical students from Newcastle University Medical School across sites.

== See also ==
- List of NHS trusts
