= Broomieknowe Golf Club =

Golf club in Bonnyrigg, Midlothian, Scotland

Coordinates: 55.885°N 3.100°W

Broomieknowe Golf Club is a parkland golf club in Bonnyrigg, Midlothian, Scotland.

== History ==
The golf club was formed in 1905 with the golf course opening in April 1906. The original course was designed by North Berwick professional golfer Ben Sayers, consisting of 18 holes and measuring 4740 yards. In 1933, golf course architect and professional James Braid redesigned the course to take advantage of new land, and extended the length to 5826 yards. The James Braid design lasted until the late 1980s, when the course undertook significant restructuring as a result of the extension of the A7 road between Edinburgh at the Scottish Borders. The new course opened in 1995 measuring 6150 yards.

== Scorecard ==
The current course has a standard scratch of 70 with a competition standard scratch of 69.

Hole	Length (Yards)	Par	Hole	Length (Yards)	Par
1	316	4	10	402	4
2	347	4	11	183	3
3	369	4	12	441	4
4	321	4	13	430	4
5	167	3	14	408	4
6	401	4	15	153	3
7	468	4	16	297	4
8	470	5	17	309	4
9	316	4	18	318	4
Out	3209	36	In	2941	34
Total	6150	70
