= Hopefield, Bonnyrigg =

Coordinates: 55.871°N 3.108°W

Hopefield
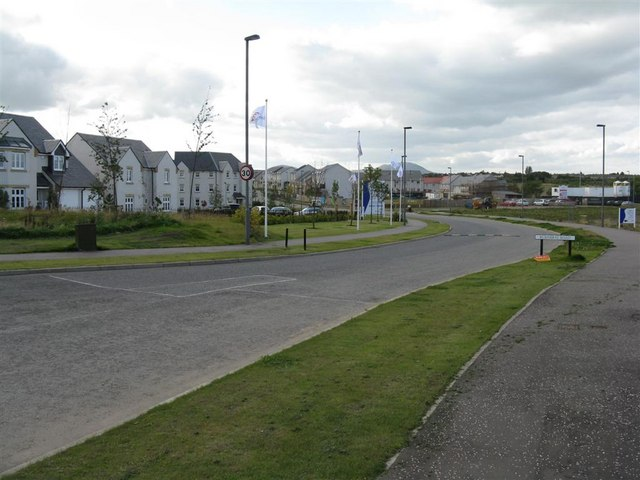
- Burnbrae Road, Hopefield

- Location within Midlothian
- OS grid reference: NT306647
- Council area: Midlothian
- Lieutenancy area: Midlothian
- Country: Scotland
- Sovereign state: United Kingdom
- Post town: BONNYRIGG
- Postcode district: EH19 3
- Dialling code: 0131
- Police: Scotland
- Fire: Scottish
- Ambulance: Scottish
- UK Parliament: Midlothian
- Scottish Parliament: Midlothian North and Musselburgh

Hopefield is an area in the south of Bonnyrigg, Midlothian, occupied by a mid-20th century residential neighbourhood and by an early-21st century, ongoing housing development, built on land dating back to 17th century Polton South Mains Farm.

The area also contains a new school, Burnbrae Primary which was opened in 2012 but required an additional 'split campus' solution by 2017 to accommodate the many families with young children moving to the area, with nursery and Primary 1 classes to be built alongside the already-planned replacement facility for the local Catholic primary school, St Mary's, to be completed in 2020. However, this still would not meet the demand for places, and the main Burnbrae school also had to be extended in 2019.
