= Rosewell and Hawthornden railway station =

Disused railway station in Rosewell, Midlothian

Rosewell and Hawthornden

General information
- Location: Rosewell, Midlothian; Scotland
- Coordinates: 55.8568°N 3.1373°W
- Grid reference: NT289632
- Platforms: 2

Other information
- Status: Disused

History
- Original company: Peebles Railway
- Pre-grouping: North British Railway
- Post-grouping: LNER; British Rail (Scottish Region)

Key dates
- 4 July 1855: Opened as Hawthornden
- 9 July 1928: Name changed to Rosewell and Hawthornden
- 10 September 1962: Closed
Location

Rosewell and Hawthornden railway station served the village of Rosewell, Midlothian, Scotland from 1855 to 1962 on the Peebles Railway.

== History ==
The station opened on 4 July 1855 by the Peebles Railway. The station was situated on the south side of the A6094. In March 1872 the NBR requested that Rosewell should be added to the beginning of the station's name. The directors of the Peebles Railway declined this, although it was later changed. Various combinations were used, such as Hawthornden & Rosewell and Hawthornden Junction & Rosewell, but Rosewell and Hawthornden was eventually used from 9 July 1928. The goods yard was to the west of the down platform and had one siding which ran to a cattle dock. The station was closed to both passengers and goods traffic on 10 September 1962.

| Preceding station | Disused railways | Following station |
|---|---|---|
| Bonnyrigg; Line and station closed | North British Railway; Peebles Railway | Rosslynlee; Line and station closed |
