= Peebles railway station (1864) =

Disused railway station in Peebles, Peeblesshire

Peebles (1864)
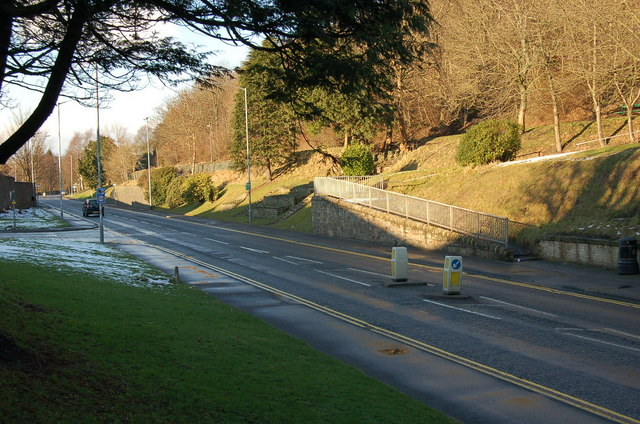
- The site of the station in 2009

General information
- Location: Peebles, Scottish Borders; Scotland
- Coordinates: 55.6545°N 3.1882°W
- Grid reference: NT253407
- Platforms: 1

Other information
- Status: Disused

History
- Original company: Peebles Railway
- Pre-grouping: North British Railway
- Post-grouping: LNER; British Rail (Scottish Region)

Key dates
- 1 October 1864: Opened as Peebles
- 25 September 1950: Name changed to Peebles East
- February 1958: Name changed back to Peebles
- 5 February 1962: Closed
Location

Peebles railway station was the second site of the railway station in Peebles, Peeblesshire, Scotland from 1864 to 1962 on the Peebles Railway.

== History ==
The station opened as Peebles on 1 October 1864 by the Peebles Railway. The station was situated at the end of Station Road. This station replaced the original so the line to Galashiels could be extended. Although the old station was used for goods, an additional goods station was built to the south of the passenger facilities on the down side. It comprised six sidings, passing through a brick goods shed and a wide goods dock. Two further sidings passed through the other side of the dock. The three remaining sidings could only be accessed from the south and they ran diagonally across the yard. Private sidings served Ballantyne's Mill, Dyer and Co.'s saw mills and Peebles gas works. Peebles Junction was to the south of the goods station and allowed direct access from the Caledonian Railway to the Peebles Railway. During 1905 the facilities were improved by the North British Railway. The original station buildings were used as temporary waiting rooms while a new one was constructed. On 25 September 1950 the station had the suffix 'East' added to its name, while the Caledonian station, which was open for goods traffic, was renamed Peebles West. This suffix was short lived and was removed from timetables in February 1958. The junction was taken out of use when Peebles West closed on 1 August 1959. The station closed to passengers and goods traffic on 5 February 1962 and track lifting was complete on the following year.

Preceding station	Disused railways	Following station
Eddleston; Line and station closed	North British Railway; Peebles Railway	Peebles (West); Line and station closed
