= Robertson Group =

British construction company

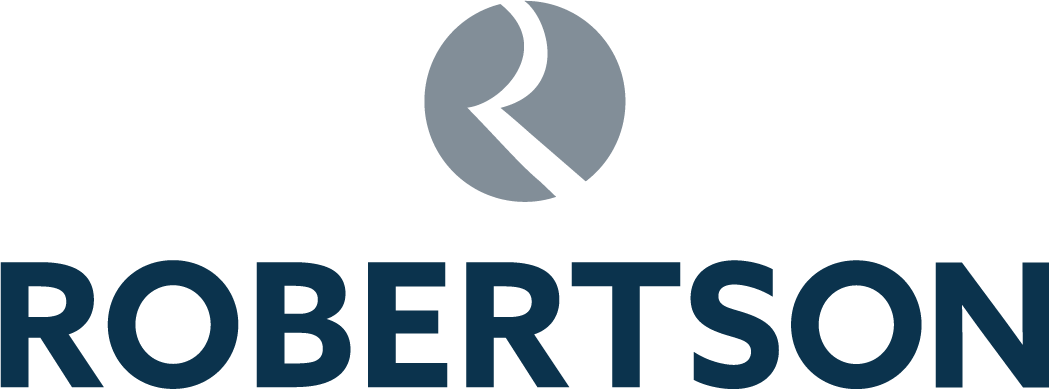
- Company type: Private
- Industry: Construction; Facilities management
- Founded: 1966
- Headquarters: Elgin, Scotland
- Key people: Sir Bill Robertson (Chairman); Elliot Robertson (CEO)
- Revenue: ▲£574.6 million (2024)
- Operating income: ▲£29.4 million (2024)
- Net income: ▲£22.8 million (2024)
- Website: www.robertson.co.uk

Robertson Group is a large British construction company based in Elgin, Scotland, but also operating in the north and midlands of England. It is the largest construction company in Scotland.

== History ==
Robertson Group was founded during 1966 by joiner Bill Robertson; the company's sole employee was Bobby Robertson, Bill's brother, who declined to act as owner despite his experience. Initial work for the business was mainly inherited from the business dealings of their father, who had suddenly died from tuberculosis as the age of 57. The local council was a valuable source of work during these early years of trading. One specific policy, pertaining to the release of housing plots, was relatively open and approachable to smaller parties, which enabled the firm to branch into the homebuilding sector via the purchase of several small plots, employ other tradesmen to build them, and sell the completed houses for profit; homebuilding would be a key early business sector alongside contract work.

Early opportunities pursued by the company were within the locale; Bill Robertson gave little thought to expanding geographically during the company's first decade. One such opportunity was the closure of a local precast concrete works that had been operated by a national company; Robertson Group purchased and reopened the works, after which it was expanded and sold on. The company kept ownership of the site it formerly occupied and subsequently had it redeveloped into a supermarket. By the mid-1970s, Robertson Group had grown to the point where employed around 50 people and owned several construction vehicles, including a 16-ton tipper truck, a three tonne dumper and its first JCB. Throughout the late 1970s and early 1980s, it expanded its activities into Inverness, Nairn, and Aberdeenshire.

During 1989, the business made a major move via the acquisition of a similar business based in Aberdeen. The move made the newly-enlarged Robertson Group the fastest-growing company based in Scotland at that time, as well as in the top ten such companies in the UK. There were some project issues related to the acquisition relating to insufficient accountability that impacted short-term profitability as Robertson Group identified and improved its running. The next major event that bolstered the company's fortunes was the introduction of the Private Finance Initiative (PFI) model, which saw private companies getting involved to a greater degree in the public sector. For Robertson Group, this initially led to the company building houses in Moray on behalf of the Ministry of Defence during the late 1990s.

During 1998, having deciding to pursue further PFI work due to the favourable margins offered, Robertson Group established its own facilities management operation. It would successfully secure several such arrangements; the resulting construction work from the PFI projects made up a considerable proportion of the overall business' growth through the 2000s, which was particularly strong, although this trend would not last as the PFI model fell out of political favour around 2010. The company reported built 63 schools, 11 hospitals, and several housing projects across England under the PFI model.

The 2008 financial crisis and the Great Recession were challenging for Robertson Group. In general, Banks abruptly became less keen to lend money to construction companies, and the business was no exception. In light of this, Robertson Group decided to change its finance model and sell off several investments that it had made, including in the PFI sector. Nevertheless, the company continued to pursue geographical expansion.

By 2016, Robertson Group reportedly employed 1,800 people (over 700 of these staff were employed in its facilities management operation alone) and recorded a turnover of roughly £300 million. Two years later, the company underwent restructuring, which included the spinning off of its housebuilding businesses. In late 2018, year-on-year turnover rose by roughly one third, from £565.4 million to £752.4 million, which was largely attributed to several major projects undertaken by the firm.

In 2018, Robertson had expanded to 3,000 employees and constructed the £140m Macallan Distillery and Visitor Experience, which won Project of the Year (over £50m) at The Construction News Awards the following year. In 2019 the company achieved Carbon Neutral Status.

Founder Bill Robertson stood down as the company's chief executive officer (CEO), in the late 2010s. During January 2020, Elliot Robertson was appointed as the company's CEO. In the 2023 New Year Honours, Bill Robertson received a knighthood for services to the construction industry and to charity in Scotland.

== Major projects ==
Major projects undertaken by the company have included:

- New Craigs Psychiatric Hospital in Inverness, completed in 2000
- Chester-le-Street Hospital in County Durham, completed in 2003
- County Community Hospital at Invergordon, completed in 2005
- St George's Park Health Centre in Morpeth, completed in 2006
- Midlothian Community Hospital in Bonnyrigg, completed in 2010
- Murray Royal Hospital in Perth, completed in 2012
- The Macallan Distillery & Visitor Experience in Speyside, completed in 2018
- Balfour Hospital in Kirkwall, completed in 2019
- The Event Complex Aberdeen, completed in 2019
- Inverness Justice Centre completed in 2020
- Community Diagnostic Centre at the MetroCentre, Gateshead, opened in 2024
