= Peebles railway station (1855) =

Disused railway station in Peebles, Peeblesshire

Peebles (1855)

General information
- Location: Peebles, Scottish Borders; Scotland
- Coordinates: 55.6556°N 3.1903°W
- Grid reference: NT252408
- Platforms: 1

Other information
- Status: Disused

History
- Original company: Peebles Railway
- Pre-grouping: North British Railway
- Post-grouping: London and North Eastern Railway

Key dates
- 4 July 1855: Opened
- 1 October 1864: Closed to passengers
- 5 February 1962: Closed completely
Location

Peebles railway station was the first site of the railway station in Peebles, Scottish Borders, Scotland from 1855 to 1962 on the Peebles Railway.

== History ==
The station opened on 4 July 1855 by the Peebles Railway. The station was situated on the north side of March Street. A goods shed was adjacent to the station. The goods yard had two sidings, one passing through the shed across March Street and the other stopping short of it. A single road engine shed opened with the line. When the line to Galashiels was planned to be extended, the site of the station would make this difficult so the PR decided that it would be advantageous to build a joint railway station with the Caledonian Railway. Negotiations failed with the CR so they built a new Peebles station to the east of Northgate. The new station still had one platform but it was longer. The new station opened on 1 October 1864 while the old station closed to passengers on the same day although it stayed open to goods traffic. The engine shed was also kept but a new road was added and a turntable was provided to the north. A new siding serving March Street mills was added in 1885. The old Peebles station was referred to as 'old station sidings' until the closure of the line on 5 February 1962. The station was blown down during a storm and the goods shed was demolished afterwards.

Preceding station	Disused railways	Following station
Eddleston; Line and station closed	North British Railway; Peebles Railway	Terminus
