= St George's Park, Morpeth =

St George's Park
- Cumbria, Northumberland, Tyne and Wear NHS Foundation Trust
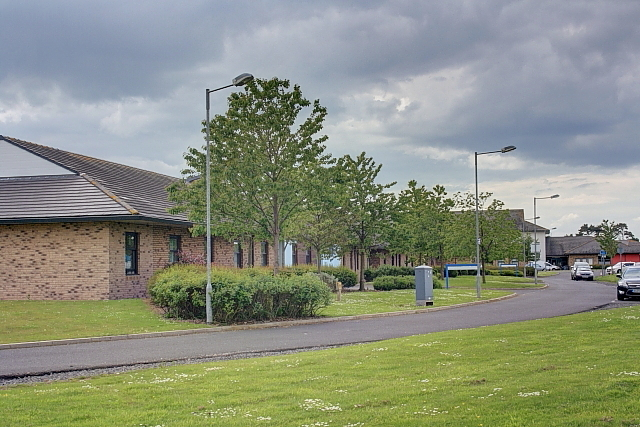
- Part of the new St George's Park facility

- Shown in Northumberland

Geography
- Location: Morpeth, Northumberland, England
- Coordinates: 55.17868°N 1.68253°W

Organisation
- Care system: NHS
- Type: Specialist

Services
- Beds: 203
- Speciality: Mental health

History
- Founded: 2006

Links
- Website: www.ntw.nhs.uk
- Lists: Hospitals in England

St George's Park is a mental health facility in Morpeth, Northumberland. It is managed by Cumbria, Northumberland, Tyne and Wear NHS Foundation Trust.

== History ==
The site for the new facility, which replaced the old St George's Hospital, is slightly to the north of the old hospital. It was procured under a private finance initiative contract in 2004. The new facility was built by Robertson Group at a cost of £27 million and opened in 2006. Robertson also have a 30 year contract for provision of facilities management services at the hospital.

From 2015 the hospital has been the base of the Northumberland Initial Response Team which provides emergency mental health care and is available 24 hours.
