= NHS Orkney =

- Type: NHS board
- Established: 1 April 2004
- Headquarters: Kirkwall, Orkney, Scotland
- Region served: Orkney
- Hospitals: Balfour Hospital
- Staff: 603 WTE (2023/24)
- Website: www.ohb.scot.nhs.uk

NHS Orkney is an NHS board that provides healthcare services in the Orkney area of Scotland.

== Services ==
NHS Orkney operates one hospital, Balfour Hospital, in Kirkwall. As of 2016, it has 24 general practitioners (GPs) who work across 6 practices.

== History ==
In 2005 NHS Orkney found it impossible to attract GPs for remote island, surgeries although offering a generous remuneration package.

In 2007, John Ross Scott, a former Liberal Democrat leader of the Scottish Borders Council became chair of the board.

In 2009 the board published their own vision for how healthcare services across the Islands could be redesigned, in order to become more sustainable.

In 2011 the board decided to use tablet computers to reduce the printing costs associated with their meetings. In February 2020, NHS Orkney owned 700 tablet/computers for staff members’ use in their jobs.

Ian Kinniburgh, the chair of NHS Shetland, took up the post of chair of NHS Orkney on 1 December 2015.

Meghan McEwen, who had been a non-executive board member since 2018, was appointed as chairwoman of NHS Orkney in February 2020.
