= Bishop Auckland Hospital =

- County Durham and Darlington NHS Foundation Trust
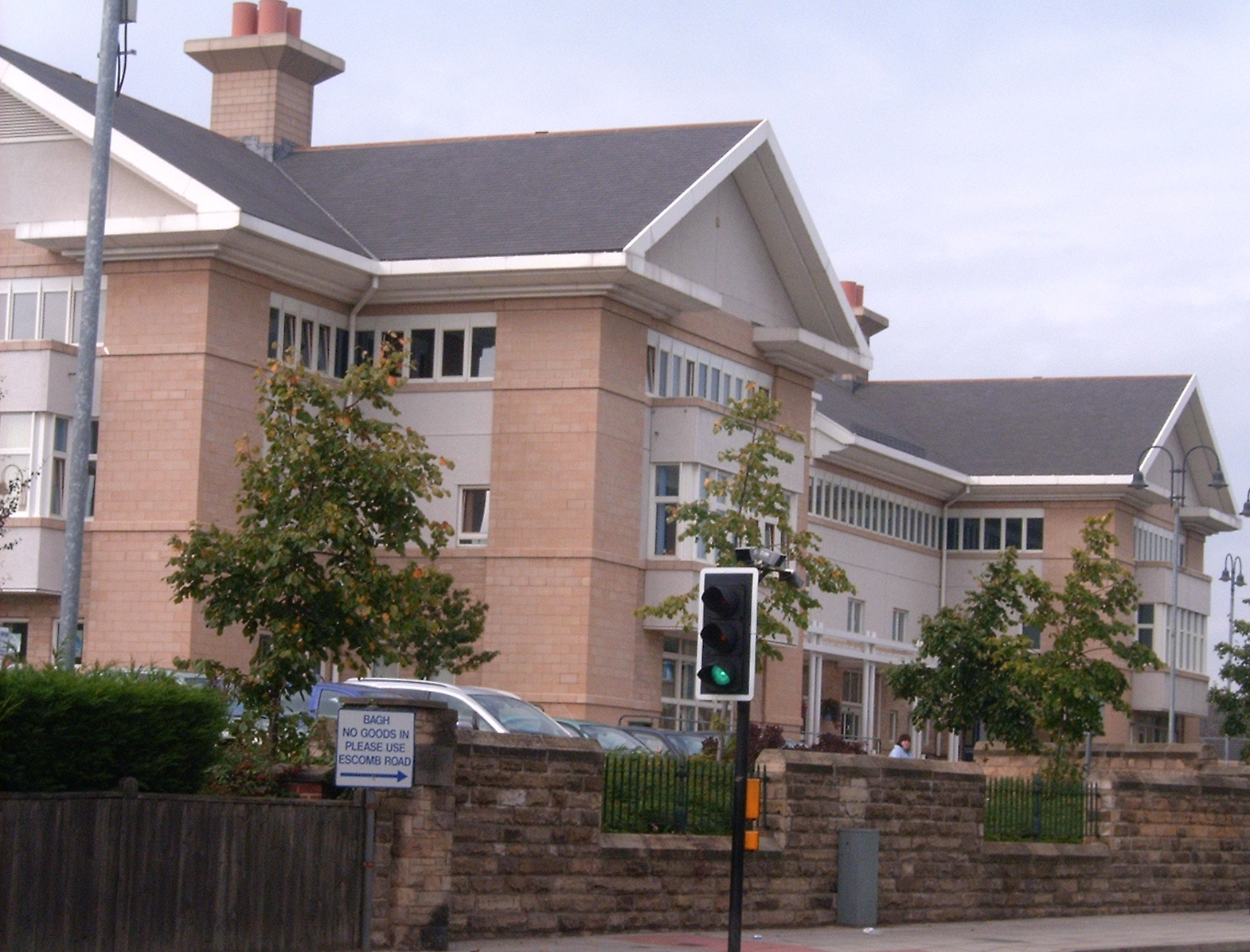

- Shown in County Durham

Geography
- Location: Bishop Auckland, County Durham, England
- Coordinates: 54.6557°N 1.6784°W

Organisation
- Care system: NHS
- Type: District general

Services
- Beds: 145

History
- Founded: 2002

Links
- Website: www.cddft.nhs.uk

Bishop Auckland Hospital is a small NHS district general hospital serving the western part of County Durham, with a primarily rural catchment area centred on the Wear Valley. The hospital is managed by the County Durham and Darlington NHS Foundation Trust.

== History ==
The original hospital in the town, known as the Bishop Auckland Infirmary, was built in around 1910. It joined the National Health Service as the Bishop Auckland General Hospital in 1948.

The new hospital was procured under a Private Finance Initiative contract to replace the old Bishop Auckland General Hospital. It was built by Shepherd Building Group at a cost of £66 million and opened in June 2002. Facilities management services are provided by ISS.

The hospital had around 286 beds when it opened, but the number has since been cut substantially. The loss of the special care baby unit (SCBU) in October 2007 created much controversy. There was also controversy over the 'decline of services' generally at the hospital at that time.

In June 2009, it was announced that the hospital's children's ward would close from 1 July 2009, with all services transferred to Darlington and Durham, a decision that was attacked by campaigners against the hospital's downgrading, but defended by NHS management on the basis of paediatric specialists being "spread too thin".

The hospital lost its acute services in October 2009. The reasons given for this by the trust were that services were being spread too thinly and there were insufficient doctors, money and resources to run three A&E departments within the trust efficiently. However opponents to this view argued that the downgrading of emergency services meant that people in the Wear Valley area would have to travel significantly further to access A&E services and that this could mean the difference between life and death. The local council spent much money on protesting against the closure of services at the hospital.

== Facilities ==
From October 2009 the hospital has a treatment centre for planned operations, a centre of excellence for hip and knee replacement.

== See also ==
- List of hospitals in England
