= Darlington Memorial Hospital =

- County Durham and Darlington NHS Foundation Trust
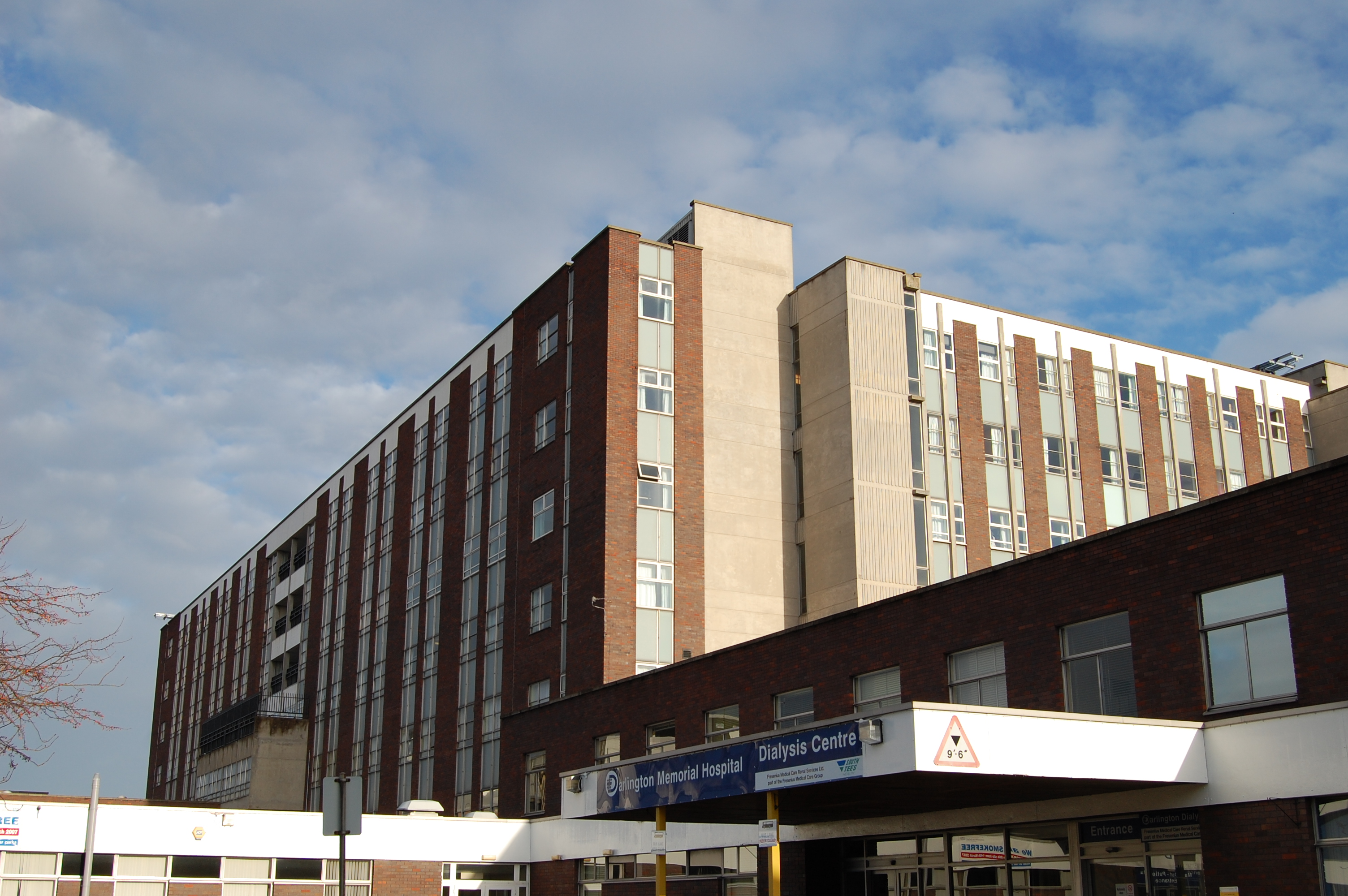
- Darlington Memorial Hospital

- Location in County Durham

Geography
- Location: Darlington, County Durham, England
- Coordinates: 54.5300°N 1.5643°W

Organisation
- Care system: National Health Service
- Type: General
- Affiliated university: Newcastle University Medical School

Services
- Emergency department: Yes
- Beds: 433

History
- Founded: 5 May 1933

Links
- Website: www.cddft.nhs.uk

Darlington Memorial Hospital is an acute NHS hospital providing healthcare for people living in southern County Durham, England. It is managed by the County Durham and Darlington NHS Foundation Trust.

== History ==
The hospital has its origins in the Darlington Dispensary established in the Market Buildings in 1808. It moved to Russell Street as the Darlington Hospital and Dispensary in 1864 and moved to Greenbank Road as the Darlington General Hospital in 1884. A new purpose-built hospital was established in Hollyhurst Road in the mid-1920s: the memorial hall, which commemorates people from Darlington who died in the First World War, stems from this era. The new hospital was officially opened in 1933 by Prince George (who later became the Duke of Kent), fourth son of George V.

The hospital was re-built in the late 1970s and re-opened in its new facilities in 1980. A state of the art MRI scanner was installed at the hospital in June 2018.

In 2025, the hospital was at the centre of a high profile lawsuit between a group of eight nurses and the County Durham and Darlington NHS Foundation Trust over their allowance since 2019 of trans women to use the women's changing room. The suit was backed by The Christian Legal Centre, and by JK Rowling.

== Services ==
Services include an accident and emergency department which has the capability to deal with most types of trauma.

== See also ==
- List of hospitals in England
