= Chester-le-Street Hospital =

- County Durham and Darlington NHS Foundation Trust
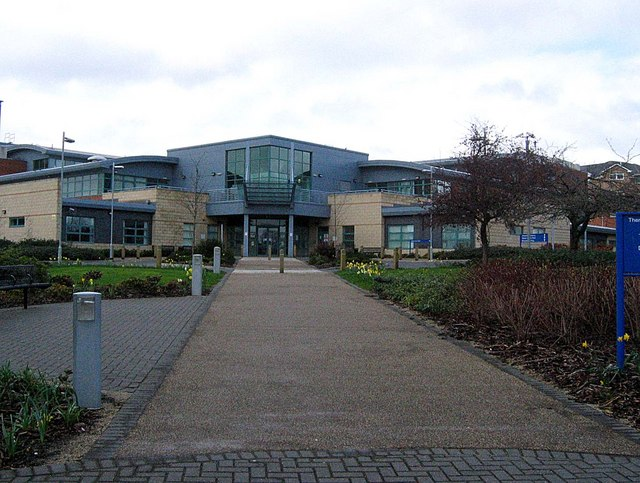
- Chester-le-Street Hospital

- Shown in County Durham

Geography
- Location: Chester-le-Street, County Durham, England
- Coordinates: 54.8510°N 1.5751°W

Organisation
- Care system: National Health Service
- Type: Community

History
- Founded: 1856

Links
- Website: www.cddft.nhs.uk

Chester-le-Street Hospital is a health facility in Chester-le-Street, County Durham, England. It is managed by County Durham and Darlington NHS Foundation Trust.

== History ==
The facility has its origins in the Chester-le-Street Union Workhouse which was designed by Matthew Thompson and opened in 1856. A new infirmary and isolation block were added to the south of the workhouse in 1898. It joined the National Health Service as Chester-le-Street Hospital in 1948. A new hospital was procured under a Private Finance Initiative contract in 2000: it was built by Robertson Group at a cost of £12 million and completed in 2003.
