= Rosslynlee Hospital =

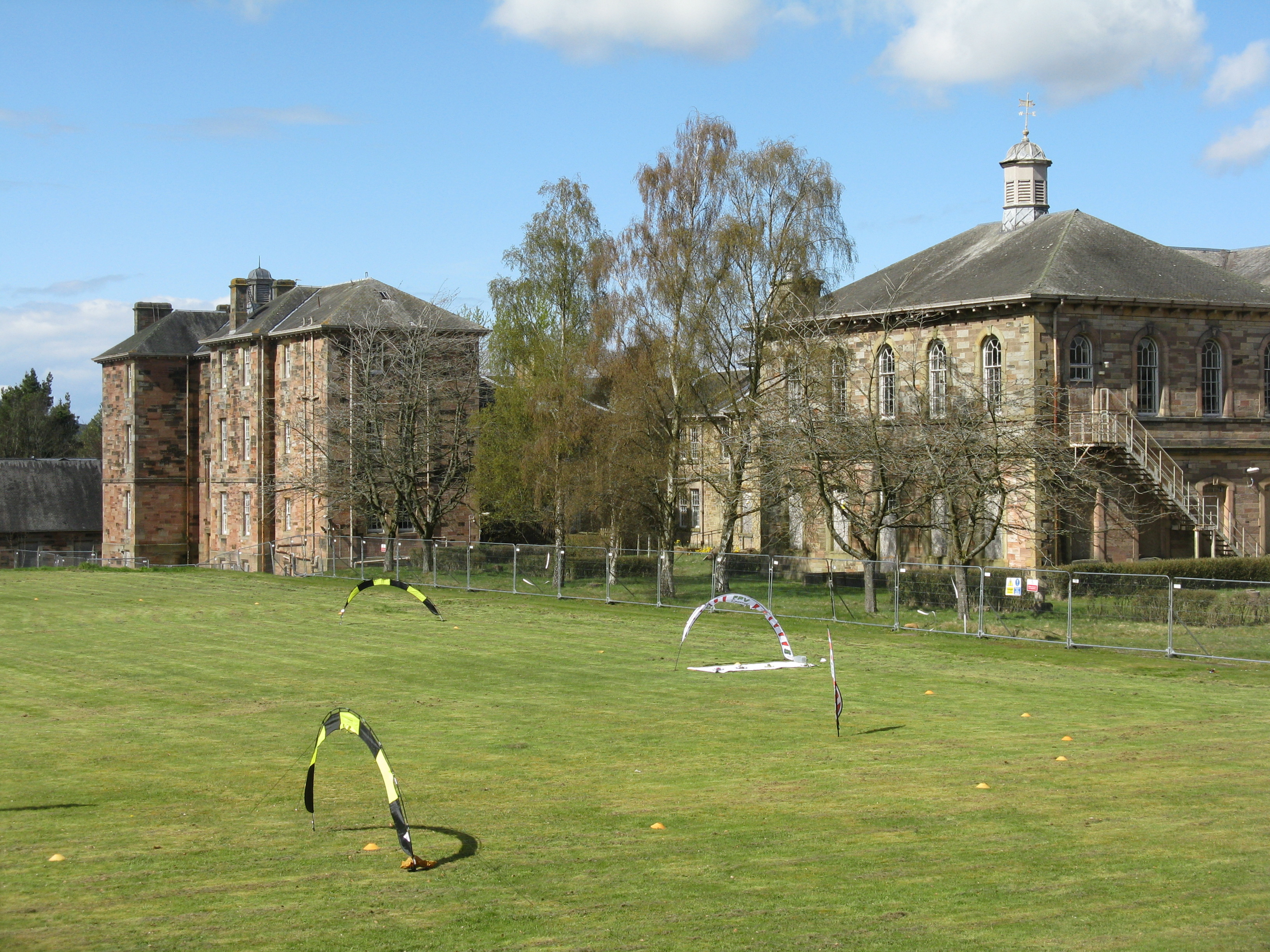
- Rosslynlee Hospital

- Shown in Midlothian

Geography
- Location: Roslin, Midlothian, Scotland
- Coordinates: 55.8355°N 3.1732°W

Organisation
- Care system: NHS Scotland
- Type: Psychiatric hospital

Services
- Emergency department: No

History
- Founded: 1874
- Closed: 2011

Links
- Lists: Hospitals in Scotland

Rosslynlee Hospital was a mental health facility near Roslin, Midlothian in Scotland. The main hospital building is a Grade C listed building. The site is currently being converted into a new village called St. Margarets.

== History ==
The hospital, which was designed by William Lambie Moffatt, opened as the Midlothian and Peebles Asylum in 1874. Two wings, designed by Sir Robert Rowand Anderson, were completed in 1898. It joined the National Health Service as Rosslynlee Mental Hospital in 1948 and became Rosslynlee Hospital in 1960.

After the introduction of Care in the Community in the early 1980s, the hospital went into a period of decline and closed in 2011. Plans have been brought forward to redevelop the site for residential use.

== Re-Development ==
The creation of a new village called St. Margarets is being promoted by Robertson Group as a redevelopment of the original hospital building and the construction of a range of detached new-build houses. This development will provide 121 luxury four, five and six bedroom homes.

On 15 July 2025, an extensive fire caused damage to the building.
