= Bonnyrigg =

Town in Midlothian, Scotland

Coordinates: 55.8747°N 3.1031°W

Bonnyrigg: Scottish Gaelic: Druim Bhuinne; Scots: Bonnie Rigg
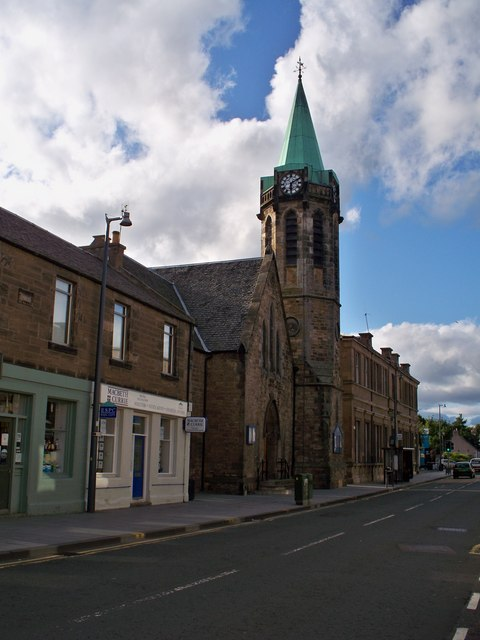
- Bonnyrigg Parish Church

- Location within Midlothian
- Population: 18,320 (2020)
- Council area: Midlothian
- Country: Scotland
- Sovereign state: United Kingdom
- Post town: Bonnyrigg
- Postcode district: EH19
- Dialling code: 0131
- Police: Scotland
- Fire: Scottish
- Ambulance: Scottish
- UK Parliament: Midlothian
- Scottish Parliament: Midlothian North and Musselburgh

Bonnyrigg is a town in Midlothian, Scotland, eight miles (13 kilometres) southeast of Edinburgh city centre, between the Rivers North and South Esk. The town had a population of 14,663 in the 2001 census, rising to 15,677 in the 2011 census, both figures being based on the 2010 definition of the locality, which, as well as Bonnyrigg and the adjacent settlement of Lasswade, includes Polton village, Poltonhall housing estate, and modern development at Hopefield. The estimated population as of 2018 was 18,120, the highest of any town in Midlothian. Along with Lasswade, Bonnyrigg is a twin town with Saint-Cyr-l'École, France.

== History ==
Bonnyrigg Toll in the early 1900s

Early maps of the locality show various versions of the village name. It first appears as a small hamlet on William Roy's map of c. 1750 as Bonnebrig. From 1763, it is called Bannockrigg or Bannoc Rig. In 1817 the village is named Bonny Ridge, then Bonny Rigg in 1828, Bonnyrig in 1834, Bonny Rig in 1850 until, finally, the Ordnance Survey map of 1850-1852 standardises the name as Bonnyrigg.

In 1865, the villages of Bonnyrigg, Red Row, Polton Street, Hillhead and Broomieknowe combined to form the burgh of Bonnyrigg, and then, in 1881, the village of Lasswade and part of Broomieknowe combined to form the burgh of Lasswade. In 1929 the two burghs joined to form the burgh of Bonnyrigg & Lasswade. This burgh lasted for 45 years until it was abolished in 1974/75, when local government changes were introduced. Bonnyrigg was a mining village until the 1920s, while its Henry Widnell & Stewart carpet factory was demolished in 1994. Twentieth century expansions included the Hopefield, Poltonhall and Waverley neighbourhoods.

The town centre mostly dates from the 19th century, though buildings at the main crossroads were rebuilt in the 1960s. In 2006, Bonnyrigg town centre benefitted from £1.5M of environmental improvements. Natural stone paving replaced the existing concrete paving slabs in areas across the town centre and new street lighting and furniture were installed.

Under the Midlothian Local Development Plan, the area's population is to rise considerably during the 2020s, with ongoing developments at Hopefield and Burnbrae south-west of the town centre augmented by another substantial project in the fields at Dalhousie Mains to the south-east. It is likely that the area's infrastructure will be unable to support the anticipated population increase.

== Transport ==
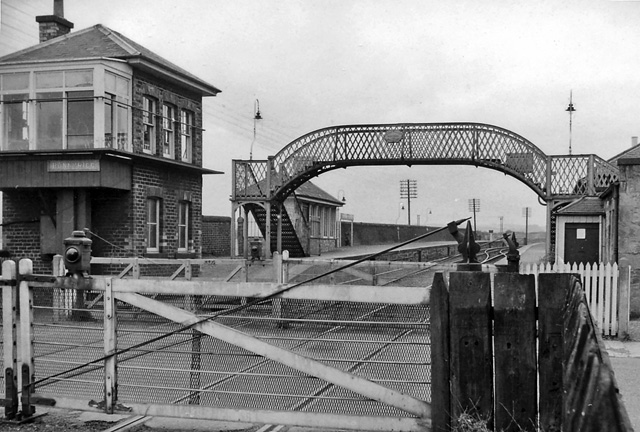
Bonnyrigg railway station in 1962

Bonnyrigg lies on the B704 (High Street)/(Dundas Street) and the A6094 (Polton Street)/(Lothian Street) which cross at Bonnyrigg Toll.

The most frequent bus service is the Lothian Buses service 31 which goes from East Craigs in the west of Edinburgh via Princes Street, passing Bonnyrigg Toll approximately every 15 minutes, terminating alternately at Hopefield and Rosewell. The X31 service runs from Haymarket in Edinburgh to Rosewell via Bonnyrigg Toll and Hopefield at peak times, with the X33 to Loanhead also passing through. Lothian Buses service 39 from Polton to Dalkeith Campus and 39A from Rosewell to the Royal Infirmary, as well as East Coast Buses services 140 & 141 from Musselburgh to Penicuik, also serve the town.

Bonnyrigg railway station served the town from 1855 until 1962 for passengers, freight services continuing until 1965 when the station closed completely. The opening of the Borders Railway in September 2015 has re-connected Bonnyrigg to the national rail network via nearby Eskbank railway station.

For walkers the Penicuik–Dalkeith Walkway passes along the re-purposed railway line, and for cyclists National Cycle Route 1 plus NCN 196 pass through the town.

== Churches ==
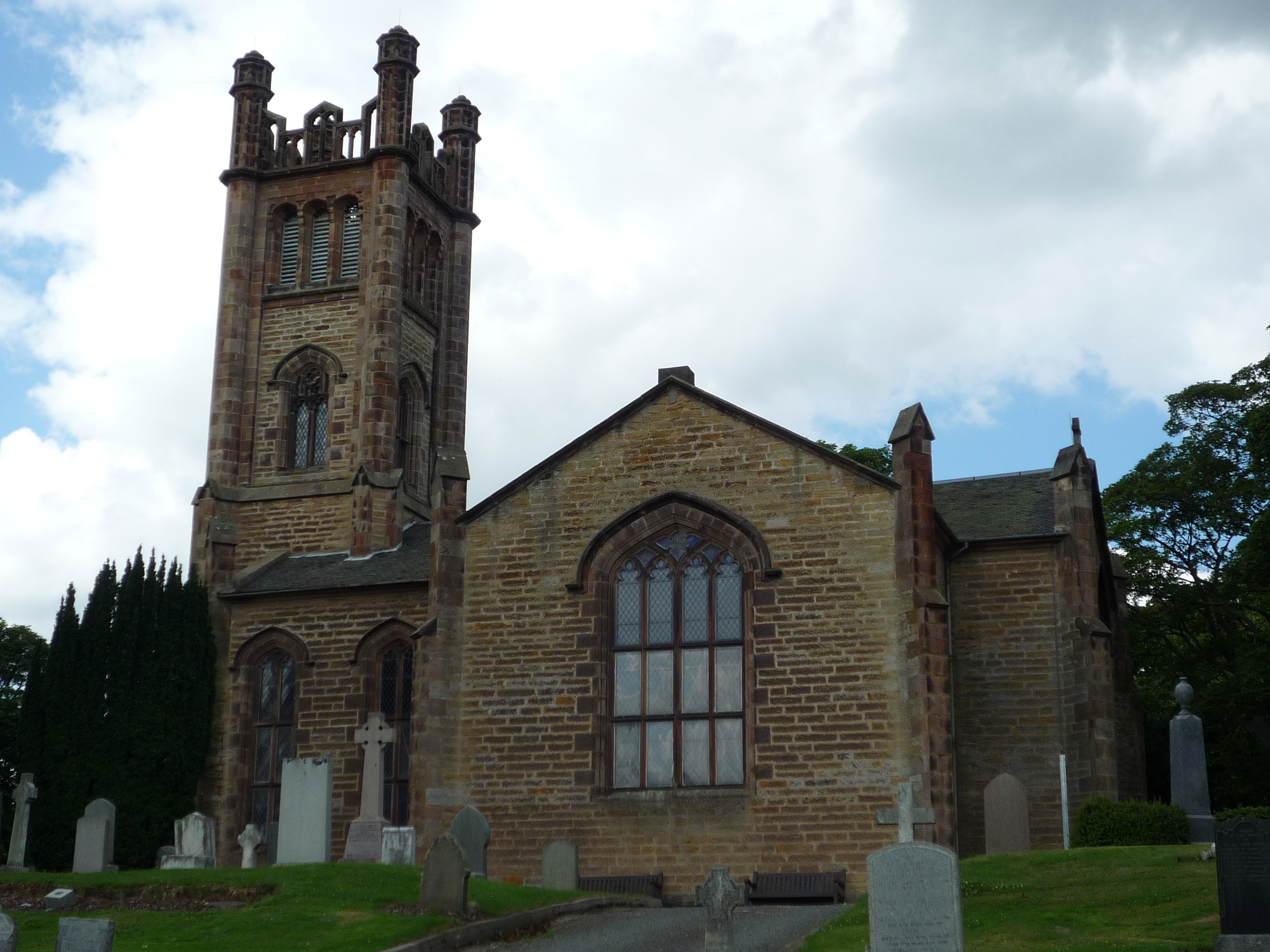
Cockpen and Carrington Parish Church

Bonnyrigg is served by several churches of different denominations. The local Church of Scotland congregations are Bonnyrigg Parish Church in the town centre, plus Cockpen and Carrington Parish Church to the south of the town. Bonnyrigg Parish Church was originally built as Cockpen Free Church. The local Catholic church is Our Lady of Consolation on Hawthornden Avenue.

== Sport ==
Bonnyrigg is home to the football club Bonnyrigg Rose F.C., who play in the Lowland League. Promotion from the league was achieved in 2022. However, a run of poor results in Scottish League Two saw the club being relegated back down to the Lowland League in the 2024-25 season, with a 3-1 loss and a 0-0 draw to the newly promoted East Kilbride F.C. sealing their fate. They are a junior club, having notably won the East Region Super League four times, and are a joint force with Bonnyrigg Rose F.C. (Boys Club). Bonnyrigg Rose F.C. play their home games at New Dundas Park and also have their own social club, Bonnyrigg Rose Social Club. Bonnyrigg Rose Boys Club play their home games at the Staiside Park, Bonnyrigg. They have teams all ages, ranging from under-7s, to under-17s.

Lasswade Rugby Football Club was founded in 1921 and initially played in a field to the west of Dobbies Road before moving to their current ground at Hawthornden in 1974. They compete in Scottish National League Division Three.

Eskvale Hockey Club also calls Bonnyrigg home, using the Lasswade Centre field hockey pitch as its home ground. It has two women's and two men's teams. The women's teams play in Scottish Hockey East Divisions 2 and 5 respectively, while the men's teams play in East Divisions 1 and 4 respectively.

The local golf course is Broomieknowe Golf Club. It is an 18-hole course with a par of 70. Mark Patchett is the resident professional.

== Other points of interest ==
King George V Park in Bonnyrigg contains a monument to the miners leader, Mick McGahey.

== In literature ==
Bonnytown, the birthplace of the eponymous protagonist of John Galt's novel Lawrie Todd (1830) is based on Bonnyrigg. Galt identifies it as 'situated in one of the pleasantest holms of the sylvan Esk' and several chapters of the book are set in the village and surrounding parts of Midlothian.

== Youth organisations ==
- 51st Boys Brigade
- 14th Midlothian (Bonnyrigg) Scout Group

== Twin town ==
Bonnyrigg is twinned with Saint-Cyr-l'École in France.

== See also ==
- Dalhousie Castle
