= Peebles Railway =

Railway in Scotland

The Peebles Railway was a railway company that built a line connecting the town of Peebles in Peeblesshire, Scotland, with Edinburgh. It opened on 4 July 1855, and it worked its own trains.

The friendly North British Railway later promoted a line, at first identified as the Galashiels, Innerleithen and Peebles Railway, from Peebles to Galashiels, making a connection with the Peebles Railway there, and also with the Caledonian Railway which had its own line at Peebles. The GI&PR line was built by the North British Railway and opened on 1 October 1864.

In 1860 the Peebles Railway company leased its line to the North British Railway, which operated the Galashiels and Edinburgh sections as a continuous through route.

Road transport of goods and passengers provided fierce competition in the 1950s and the line closed in 1962. No railway use is now made of the former lines.

== History ==
=== Before the Peebles railway ===
In the eighteenth century Peebles had become an important manufacturing town, chiefly for woollen weaving and also the preparation of cotton and linen products, and also brewing. Its location on the banks of the Upper River Tweed put it on the communication routes of the area, constrained by the hills north and south surrounding Windlestraw Law and Dollar Law respectively.

When the turnpikes were introduced, Peebles was within five hours of Edinburgh by post-chaise. In 1807 Thomas Telford was commissioned to design a double-track waggonway connecting Glasgow and Berwick, a distance of 125 miles (201 km), running through Carluke, Peebles and Melrose. The waggonway would have been horse-operated, and was intended to form an outlet for iron products and lime to the borders area, and agricultural products, in particular grain, to the industrial towns of central Scotland.

The mountainous terrain of the route would have required steep gradients which would have been challenging for horse traction, and the estimated cost of construction was £365,000, a huge amount at that time, and the scheme was dropped.

A second waggonway scheme was proposed in 1821, this time designed by Robert Stevenson, on an alternative route but it too was considered too ambitious to be practicable.

In 1838 the Edinburgh and Glasgow Railway was authorised by the Edinburgh and Glasgow Railway Act 1838 (1 & 2 Vict. c. lviii). Although local railways had been operating in Scotland, this was a major advance, connecting the two great cities. As the construction progressed, public opinion became active over making a connection between central Scotland and the merging English railway network. The controversy became very heated, and a great number of schemes were put forward, including some that would run through Peebles. Not all of the schemes were realistic, and in time they reduced to what became the North British Railway line between Edinburgh and Berwick, the Caledonian Railway between Edinburgh and Glasgow and Carlisle through the valley of the River Annan, and what became the Glasgow and South Western Railway via Kilmarnock and Dumfries. These great companies were all authorised by Parliament in the middle years of the 1840s.

The Caledonian Railway proposed the Caledonian Extension Railway in 1845, to run eastward from the Lanark area through Biggar and Stobo to Peebles, continuing through Galashiels to Kelso; this would have cost £1,500,000, the same as the Caledonian Railway itself from Edinburgh and Glasgow to Carlisle. However the proposal was rejected in Parliament.

In 1845 too, the North British Railway suggested a Peebles branch from Galashiels on the line that it was then building, which became the Waverley Route. The townspeople of Peebles did not think an eastward line to Galashiels was their highest priority. Supporters of an independent railway to Edinburgh had also been active, and on 23 June 1845 a meeting was held in Edinburgh. It was told that a line had been designed leaving the Edinburgh and Hawick Railway near the later Niddrie station.

In the 1846 parliamentary session, the Edinburgh and Peebles Bill failed standing orders, and the North British Peebles branch was withdrawn by its proposers: neither line would proceed.

=== The Peebles Railway ===
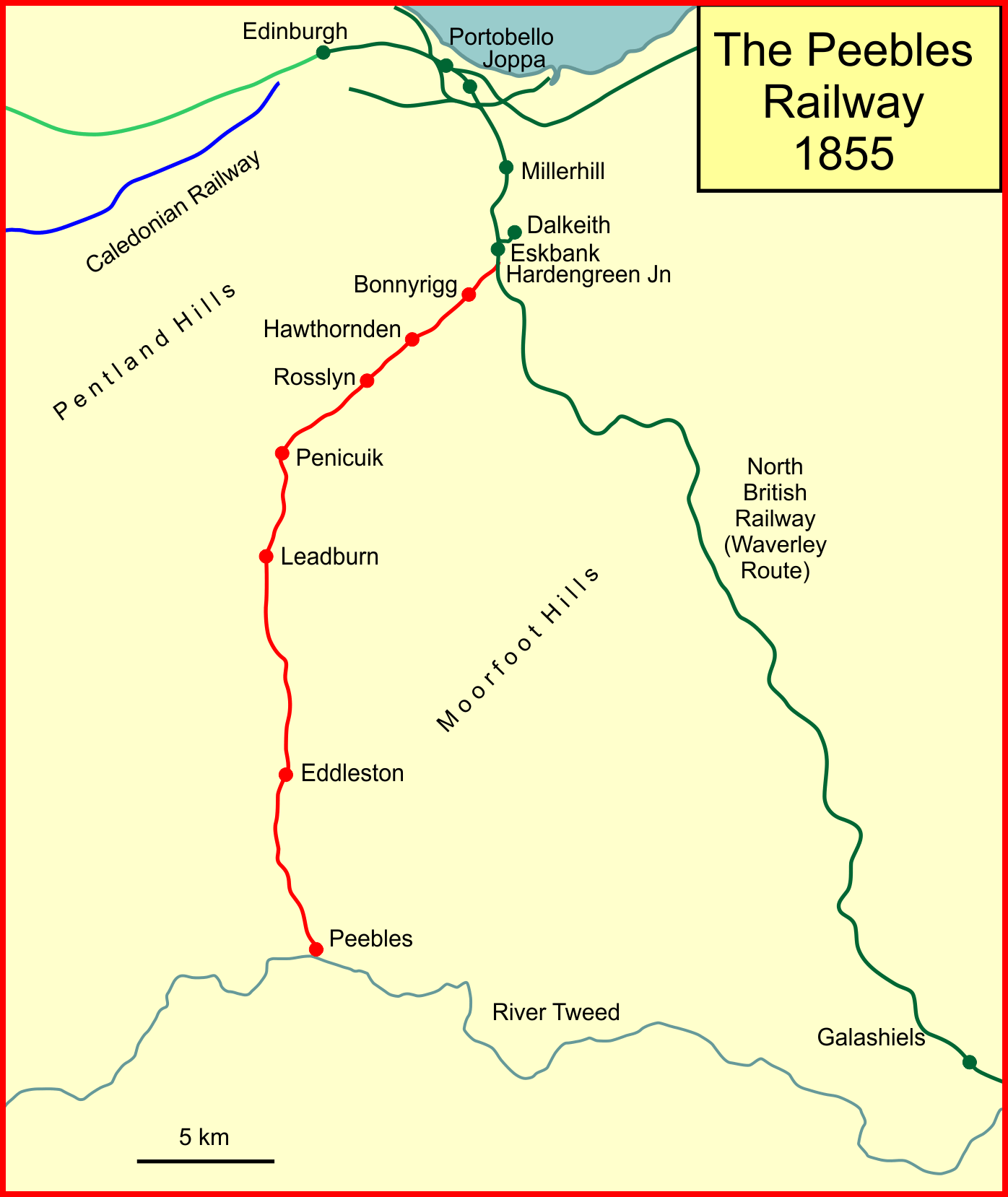
The Peebles Railway in 1855

As the Scottish railway network developed in the following years, the cost of transporting goods to and from towns connected to a line fell dramatically; and Peebles, and other towns not connected, felt at a marked disadvantage in the cost of the necessities of living, and in moving its manufactures to markets, and this heightened the feeling that Peebles must have a railway line. John Bathgate was the principal promoter of the Peebles Railway.

In April 1852 a meeting was held, at which a revised version of the failed Edinburgh and Peebles scheme was tabled. The engineer Thomas Bouch was engaged. The line would run through Penicuik and join the Hawick line at Eskbank, near Dalkeith, shortening the length of new construction, and the line could be built for £80,000. There was considerable enthusiasm locally and in London for the line and numerous persons registered for shares, although in the event many of them did not proceed with the commitment they had made. Enthusiasm took hold of the provisional committee too, for they sought tenders for the construction of the line and accepted one.

Peebles Railway Act 1853
- Act of Parliament
- Parliament of the United Kingdom
- Long title: An Act for making a Railway from the Hawick Branch of the North British Railway, near to the Eskbank Station, to the Royal Burgh of Peebles.
- Citation: 16 & 17 Vict. c. lxxviii

Dates
- Royal assent: 8 July 1853

Text of statute as originally enacted

There remained the issue of actually obtaining the act of Parliament incorporating the company, but this went through without great difficulty, as the Peebles Railway Act 1853 (16 & 17 Vict. c. lxxviii), and on 8 July 1853 (Note: Thomas, volume 1 page 106 and Marshall (page 31); Carter, page 247 incorrectly says 8 August 1853.) the Peebles Railway was authorised, with capital of £70,000.

=== Getting the line ready ===
The directors put in hand the construction of the line, under Bouch's supervision, and the share subscriptions were coming in satisfactorily. They considered the working of the line, and talked to the North British Railway but found their financial terms unacceptable. They went to some lengths to explore the possibility of getting an independent contractor to work the line, but this proved fruitless, and the company decided to work the line itself. They set about procuring the rolling stock, and planning the workforce, for operating and for track and rolling stock maintenance, that would be required.

On 2 April 1855 the line was ready enough for the steam locomotive Soho to be brought to Peebles, but this seems to have been a demonstration run, for it was not until 29 May that passenger coaches and goods wagons were brought to Peebles.

The line was considered ready for inspection by the Board of Trade inspecting officer, and Captain H. W. Tyler visited on 28 June. The inspection was thought to have gone well, but the formal approval received from the Board of Trade stipulated working by one engine only, and that sidings were required to shunt goods trains before passenger trains (Note: Marshall, page 46; it is not clear whether this means clearing the line intermediately by horse traction or forming trains at the starting point without occupying the main line.) were started. The company had issued printed bye-laws and regulations, but these referred to disciplinary matters and not to operating rules; the company had two locomotives and appear not to have given thought to signalling arrangements. While considering what was to be done, the company started operating within the BoT requirements, and on 4 July 1855 the train service started. This apparently involved the construction of a passing loop at Penicuik.

Relations with the contractor for constructing the line appear to have deteriorated in the final months, and after opening it was stated in a general shareholders' meeting that there was an outstanding debt of £5,600, but that the board would not pursue for damages. (Note: Marshall, page 50; it is unclear whether the debt was from the contractor to the company or vice versa; and it is remarkable that so large a debt, equal to a year's income, should simply be written off.)

=== The line in operation ===
Three trains operated in each direction daily, except Sundays. Leaving Edinburgh the Peebles coaches were attached at the rear of an NBR Hawick train, and detached at Eskbank. There the Peebles Railway locomotive coupled to the detached portion and took the train on to Peebles. The physical junction was at Hardengreen. The locomotives ran tender first from Eskbank to Peebles.

The trains were an instant success, carryings being beyond what could have been anticipated, and the first full week brought in receipts of £99, climbing a month later to £166. The stations were Peebles, Eddleston, Leadburn, Penicuik, Roslin and Hawthornden, but at the last minute it was agreed to provide a station at Bonnyrigg, and this was opened a month after the opening of the line itself.

In 1856 the North British Railway operated seven trains each way daily except Sundays, of which four were passenger trains. One of these was a "fast passenger" service leaving Peebles at 08:50 and taking 65 minutes, returning at 16:20 and also taking 65 minutes.

Soon after the opening one of the locomotives, St Ronans, became defective, "because it could not negotiate the curves on the track". Although the company owned two locomotives and was only allowed to use one at a time, nonetheless it found it necessary to hire in a replacement. The other locomotive was named Tweed. The locomotive fleet was soon augmented but the details are unclear. The carriage stock was also required to be increased, but these acquisitions were straining the capital resources of the company and deferment of payment was practised.

The electric telegraph was installed on the line (and the NBR section), giving Peebles telegraph communication with Edinburgh for the first time, from 1858.

=== Additional capital ===
Peebles Railway Amendment Act 1857
- Act of Parliament
- Parliament of the United Kingdom
- Long title: An Act to enable the Peebles Railway Company to create additional Shares in their Undertaking; and for other Purposes.
- Citation: 20 & 21 Vict. c. xiv

Dates
- Royal assent: 26 June 1857

Text of statute as originally enacted

An act of Parliament, the Peebles Railway Amendment Act 1857 (20 & 21 Vict. c. xiv), was obtained on 27 June 1857 authorising the issue of an additional £27,000 in shares; improvements and rectification of some deficiencies in the original construction of the line needed attention.

In 1859 it was decided to install turntables at Peebles and Hardengreen Junction, as the tender-first running was said to cause excessive wear on the locomotives and the track. The North British Railway had to install the Hardengreen turntable and this seems to have been delayed, being ready in 1860.

The track had been laid with the cheapest materials at the advice of the engineer Thomas Bouch, and already in 1858 it was giving trouble, being in need of major renewal. The routine maintenance was carried out by platelayers with the assistance of a labourer, each responsible for about two miles of route. In August 1860 all the wooden bridges on the line were tarred and repainted.

=== Extending the line ===
North British (Galashiels and Peebles) Railway Act 1861
- Act of Parliament
- Parliament of the United Kingdom
- Long title: An Act for making a Railway from the Hawick Line of the North British Railway near Galashiels to Peebles, and for other Purposes.
- Citation: 24 & 25 Vict. c. cii

Dates
- Royal assent: 28 June 1861

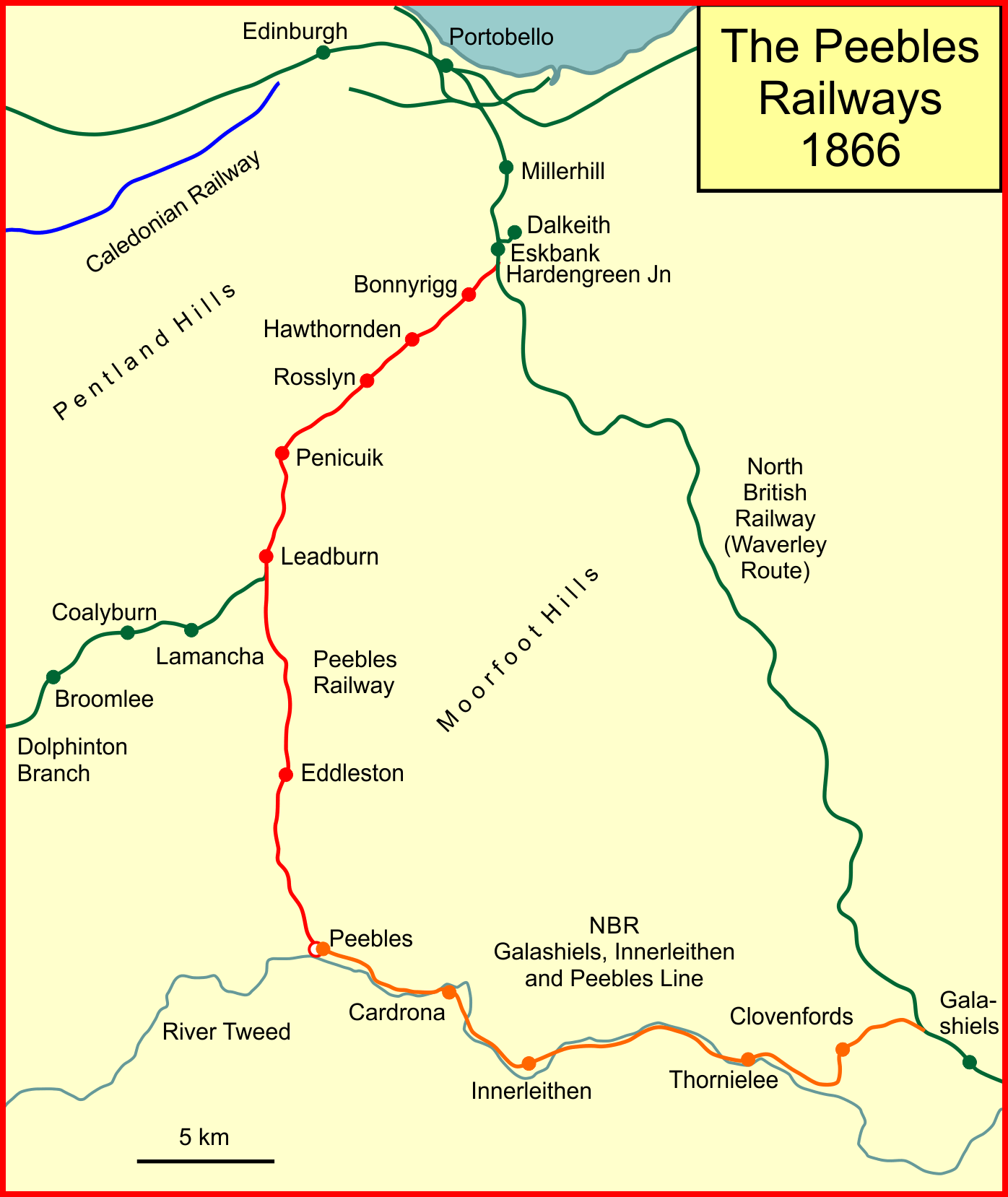
The Peebles lines in 1866

For some time the community of Innerleithen had agitated for a railway connection, by the building of an independent line from Peebles. A number of attempts were made to bring this about without success, until in 1860 a line was proposed from Galashiels to Peebles through Innerleithen. Agreement was made for the North British Railway to run the trains. (Note: Presumably to work the line, but Marshall states (page 90) that the working of the line would be in the hands of the NBR but "even so the line would be ... run by local proprietors".) The railway was promoted as the Galashiels, Innerleithen and Peebles Railway (GI&PR). A parliamentary bill failed in 1860, but being re-presented the following year as an NBR branch, it gained royal assent on 28 June 1861 as the North British (Galashiels and Peebles) Railway Act 1861 (24 & 25 Vict. c. cii). The capital authorised was £95,000.

A Caledonian dependency, the Symington, Biggar and Broughton Railway, had been extended to Peebles and the GI&PR line would meet it, as well as the Peebles Railway, there.

The first section, from Peebles to Innerleithen, was opened on 10 October 1864 (Note: Marshall, page 91; Ross says 1 October 1864, page 61, as does Perkins) and the remainder on 18 June 1866. The Peebles Railway terminus at Peebles was unsuitable for the through services contemplated, and after unsuccessful overtures to the Caledonian Railway proposing a joint station, the North British Railway built a new single platform station to serve the Galashiels line and the Peebles Railway trains. It was a modest affair, opening in 1864. The Peebles Railway station continued in use for the time being, renamed Peebles (Old).

The train service now operated from Galashiels to Edinburgh via Peebles, as a through route; there were five trains daily, two on Sundays, with some short workings.

The Caledonian Railway station at Peebles was on the south side of the River Tweed and a connection was to be made crossing the river; the connection with the GI&PR line was intended to be a triangle, allowing through running towards Galashiels and towards Edinburgh.

It is doubtful whether the eastward curve was completed, although the earthworks were formed. (Note: Acknowledging much debate over the issue, Marshall says that at least one map and a contemporary engraving show it, but although Marshall shows a large number of images and maps in his book, he does not reproduce these. At that period map publishers often depicted proposed works as if built, hoping to future-proof their works. Marshall concedes that when Captain Rich inspected the Innerleithen line, the south to east curve was not connected. Ross refers to this on page 73, but he calls it the west-to-south link. He must have intended to say "the east-to-south link" for he goes on to regret that a through connection to the East Coast line was never realised.) The NBR wished to prevent the Caledonian gaining access to Galashiels, which the curve would have enabled.

When the line opened throughout, the NBR operated passenger trains through from Edinburgh to Galashiels via Peebles.

=== Lease to the North British Railway ===
North British Peebles Railway (Lease) Act 1861
- Act of Parliament
- Parliament of the United Kingdom
- Long title: An Act to provide for the leasing of the Peebles Railway to the North British Railway Company.
- Citation: 24 & 25 Vict. c. cxiv

Dates
- Royal assent: 11 July 1861

From about 1858 the Peebles Railway considered sale of its line to the NBR "before major expenditure on the line would be required". The NBR itself was planning to absorb several local railways and negotiations were fruitful. On 14 April 1860 a shareholders' meeting heard the proposed sale, but rejected it. (Note: A simple majority voted for it, but 75% was required by statute, and this was not achieved.) The company chairman resigned immediately. A further proposal, to lease the line to the NBR, was tabled the following year, on 1 February 1861, and shareholders voted for it. The terms were generous: the line was profitable but considerable upgrade work was necessary. The NBR agreed to pay for PR shareholders to receive between 5% and 6% dividends, as well as considerable other expenses including purchase of the Peebles Railway's rolling stock for £20,000. The North British Peebles Railway (Lease) Act 1861 (24 & 25 Vict. c. cxiv) authorised the move on 11 July 1861.

=== Connecting lines ===
The Peebles Railway company determined not to extend its line or make branches, but it co-operated with independent concerns that wished to do so and to make connections with its line. In North British Railway days a similar policy was followed.

The Leadburn, Linton and Dolphinton Railway was authorised by the Leadburn, Linton and Dolphinton Railway Act 1862 (25 & 26 Vict. c. li) of 3 June 1862, to form a junction with the Peebles Railway line at Leadburn. It opened on 4 July 1864. The Dolphinton station was separate from the Caledonian Railway station there, although shunt transfers were possible through a siding connection.

During the construction of the Dolphinton line, there was a collision at the junction at Leadburn on 29 October 1863. A construction train working on the Dolphinton line ran away on a steep gradient to Leadburn. The only protection to the main line was a scotch block at Leadburn, and the runaway vehicles ran over the block and collided head on with an approaching passenger train on the Peebles line; a boy was killed and several persons were injured.

The Esk Valley Railway was being promoted in 1860; it was to run to Polton, a village with several important paper mills, from a junction with the Peebles Railway at Hardengreen. The North British Railway provided much of the deposit required to submit the parliamentary bill, and the Peebles Railway gave its consent. The Esk Valley Railway got its authorising act, the Esk Valley Railway Act 1863 (26 & 27 Vict. c. cxcv), on 21 July 1863, and the line opened on 16 April 1867. The point of divergence of the Esk Valley line was a short distance south of Hardengreen Junction, and the Esk Valley line ran parallel with the Peebles Railway for that section; it was later agreed to convert the two single lines to operate as one double track from Hardengreen Junction to Esk Valley Junction.

The first station on the Esk Valley line was to be called Bonnyrigg. It was closer to the town than the Peebles Railway Bonnyrigg station, but the Peebles Railway was unwilling at first to change the name of its own station. The PR later agreed to change the name of its Bonnyrigg station to Bonnyrigg Road. This led to confusion of passengers, and the NBR renamed the station Broomieknowe and the Peebles Railway station reverted to Bonnyrigg.

The nominally independent Penicuik Railway was authorised by the Penicuik Railway Act 1870 (33 & 34 Vict. c. xli) of 20 June 1870, for a 4-mile (6.4 km) branch from Hawthornden on the Peebles Railway to Penicuik. It was opened on 2 September 1872, and the company was absorbed by the NBR on 1 August 1876 along with the Esk Valley Railway.

The Peebles Railway had a Penicuik station, which was a considerable distance from the town, and it was now renamed Pomathorn

The North British Railway had renamed Roslin as Rosslyn in 1864 and renamed it again Rosslynlee in 1872 because of the Rosslyn station on the Penicuik Railway line. Rosslyn on the Penicuik line was renamed Rosslyn Castle on 11 Feb 1874. Rosslynlee closed from 1 January 1917 to 2 June 1919.

=== Amalgamation ===
From 1870 the Peebles Railway and the NBR considered amalgamation, and agreement having been reached, the North British Railway (Additional Powers) Act 1876 (39 & 40 Vict. c. cxxxiv) of 13 July authorised the amalgamation, which became effective on 1 August 1876.

=== Angling Club Cottage Platform ===
Edinburgh Angling Club had acquired a house, named The Nest, close to the River Tweed, near Clovenfords. (The location is on Cliff Road, a short distance west of the roundabout junction of the present-day A72 and A707.) In 1898 an unadvertised halt named Angling Club Cottage Platform was provided there for the use of club members. The halt became disused in the mid-twentieth century.

=== The twentieth century ===
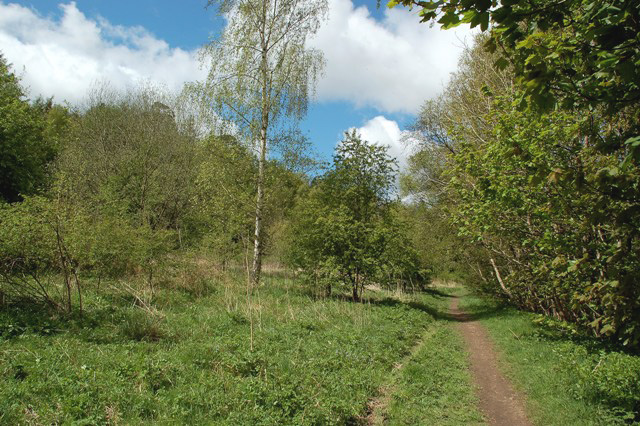
Section of the disused line near Torwoodlee

Passenger train services had now been enhanced to six daily from Galashiels to Edinburgh via Peebles with an additional Saturdays Innerleithen to Edinburgh train; by now the typical journey time was a little under an hour from Peebles to Edinburgh. A Peeblesshire Express was introduced for business travel from Peebles to Edinburgh. It left Peebles at 08:44 daily, stopping at Leadburn to attach a portion from Broomlee on the Dolphinton branch, arriving at Edinburgh at 09:37. The return train left Edinburgh at 16:32 Monday to Friday, and 13:33 on Saturdays.

In 1905 the North British Railway extended and improved the Peebles station, although it remained a one-platform station, with no passing loop.

The Border Show was held in Peebles by the Highland and Agricultural Society in July 1906, and the North British was asked to arrange special services atr reduced rates, which it declined to do. In 1904 the NBR had declared that it considered Peebles an inappropriate location for the heavy traffic that the show would attract, due to the limited track facilities there. 20,000 visitors daily were expected, requiring 20 to 30 trains. Considerable public criticism resulted, and in March 1905 the NBR realised that the rival Caledonian Railway was improving its own Peebles branch. This resulted in an immediate move to arrange the necessary facilities. Additional stabling sidings and a passing loop were provided, and the old station was to be reopened temporarily for passenger use. The company was still concerned about line capacity and issued a public notice that "The Company will not guarantee passengers will reach Peebles and will not be responsible for delays." In the event the trains ran and some delays were experienced. The NBR lost considerable good will because of its stance over the matter.

There was a daily goods service over the link line between the Caledonian and North British stations at Peebles, but there was never a regular passenger service. Light engines used it after the closure of Peebles (NBR) engine shed if they required to turn, using the Caledonian turntable. However some passenger excursions used the link. On 25 June 1936 a Caledonian Railway excursion from Lanark ran to Galashiels, using the link, and reversing in Peebles NBR station.

In 1923 the railways of Great Britain were "grouped" following the Railways Act 1921; the North British Railway was a constituent of the new London and North Eastern Railway (LNER). Twenty five years later, nationalisation of the nation's railways took place, and the Peebles route was part of the Scottish Region of British Railways. Now that both railway lines to Peebles were under the same ownership, Peebles NBR station was renamed Peebles (East) on 25 September 1952, although the former Caledonian Railway branch had closed to passengers by then. The NBR station reverted to simple Peebles in February 1958.

Diesel multiple unit trains were introduced on the line from 17 February 1958 after a demonstration run on 11 June 1956; a considerably enhanced passenger service was introduced in the Edinburgh suburban area, extending out as far as Rosewell.

A new station, Rosslynlee Hospital Halt, was opened on 11 December 1958 to serve Rosslynlee Hospital; the existing Rosslynlee station was not conveniently situated for the hospital. The House Steward at the hospital sold tickets.

However the general decline in local rural passenger services was hastened by the improving bus services, and the Peebles line was nominated for closure. The final passenger trains ran on 3 February 1962, and the following day the route between Hawthornden Junction and Galashiels via Peebles was closed completely.

The Edinburgh suburban passenger service from Edinburgh to Rosewell and Hawthornden continued until Saturday 8 September 1962, being closed from 10 September. The Penicuik branch continued to operate a goods train service, and the Peebles Railway section from Hardengreen Junction to Hawthornden Junction (where the Penicuik line diverged) remained open to serve those trains, until they ceased in 1967.

The entire network of lines is closed to railway activity; the section between Hardengreen Junction and Rosewell has been converted to a cycleway.

== Topography ==
Original Peebles Railway line: opened 4 July 1855; closed from Hawthornden Junction to Peebles 5 February 1962; closed to passengers from Hardengreen Junction to Rosewell 10 September 1962..

Locations on the line were:

- Hardengreen Junction; the Peebles Railway diverged from the Hawick line;
- Esk Valley Junction; the Esk Valley line diverged;
- Bonnyrigg; renamed Bonnyrigg Road from 1868; closed 10 September 1962;
- Hawthornden; variously known as Rosewell and Hawthornden, and Hawthornden Junction and Rosewell; closed 10 September 1962;
- Hawthornden Junction; the Penicuik Railway diverged;
- Roslin; renamed Rosslyn 1864; renamed Rosslynlee 1872; closed 1 January 1917; reopened 2 June 1919;
- Rosslynlee Hospital Halt; opened 11 December 1958;
- Penicuik; renamed Pomathorn 1872; renamed Pomathorn Halt 1947;
- Leadburn; the Dolphinton line diverged; the summit of the line at 935 feet was near Leadburn; closed 7 March 1955;
- Earlyvale Gate; opened June 1856; trains stopped at the level crossing on market days etc.; closed 28 February 1857;
- Eddleston;
- Peebles; closed after 1 October 1864, superseded by new station built by NBR.

North British Railway extension to Galashiels: opened 1 October 1864; closed 5 February 1962.

- Peebles; renamed Peebles East 1950; renamed Peebles 1958;
- Cardrona;
- Glenormiston Halt (private unadvertised halt)
- Innerleithen;
- Walkerburn; opened 15 January 1867;
- Thornilee; opened 18 June 1866; soon renamed Thornielee; closed 6 November 1950;
- Angling Club Cottage Platform; opened 1898; closed in the late 1940s;
- Clovenfords; opened 18 June 1866;
- Kilnknowe Junction; convergence with the NBR line to Galashiels.
