= SIBC (disambiguation) =

SIBC may refer to:

- Second International Bahá'í Council, an institution recognized by several competing Bahá'í divisions
- SIBC, the local independent radio station in Shetland, Scotland
- Solomon Islands Broadcasting Corporation, the official radio and television broadcaster of the Solomon Islands
- Shanghai Institute for Biological Sciences, a branch of Chinese Academy of Sciences
