= 96.2 FM =

FM radio frequency

This is a list of radio stations that broadcast on FM frequency 96.2 MHz:

== Belarus ==
- Melodii Veka

== China ==
- CNR Business Radio in Liupanshui
- CNR Music Radio in Liupanshui
- Guangzhou News Radio in Guangzhou

== Greece ==
- Argos Radio Deejay

== Ireland ==
- Midlands 103 in Portlaoise
- Radio Kerry

== Latvia ==
- EHR Russkie Hiti in Riga

== Malaysia ==
- Terengganu FM in Northern Terengganu

== New Zealand ==
- Classic Hits Southern Lakes (Wanaka frequency)
- Coromandel FM (Thames Coast frequency)
- Solid Gold (Gisborne frequency)

== United Kingdom ==
- Heart West (Barnstaple frequency)
- KMFM West Kent (Tonbridge frequency)
- Greatest Hits Radio Bucks, Beds and Herts (Aylesbury frequency)
- Greatest Hits Radio Norfolk & North Suffolk (Fakenham frequency)
- Heart North East (Newcastle frequency)
- Greatest Hits Radio Manchester & The North West (Oldham frequency)
- SIBC (Bressay frequency)
- Capital Mid-Counties (Coventry frequency)
- Capital Midlands (Nottingham frequency)
- Greatest Hits Radio Yorkshire Coast (Scarborough frequency)
- Kingdom FM (West Fife frequency)

== Vietnam ==
- Dong Thap Radio, in Đồng Tháp Province
