= NHS Shetland =

- Type: NHS board
- Established: 1 April 2004
- Headquarters: Lerwick, Shetland, Scotland
- Region served: Shetland
- Hospitals: Gilbert Bain Hospital
- Staff: 665 WTE (2023/24)
- Website: www.nhsshetland.scot

NHS Shetland is an NHS board which provides healthcare services in Shetland, Scotland. The organisation is responsible for the provision of health and social care to the population of around 23,000 people that are resident in Shetland. There are 10 GP practices in Shetland with a primary care emergency centre in Lerwick staffed by three salaried GPs.

== Services ==
NHS Shetland operates one hospital:

- Gilbert Bain Hospital, Lerwick

== History ==
Following a public consultation in June 2011 Montfield Hospital, Lerwick was closed in November 2011. In December 2013, NHS Shetland moved its headquarters to the upper floor of Montfield.

There are difficulties in recruiting and retaining staff because of the isolation of some of the practices. As of December 2014, Whalsay has been without a permanent doctor for more than a year.

The director of public health is Susan Webb.
