= Henry Aitken =

Henry Aitken may refer to:

- Henry Aitken (cricketer) (1831–1915), English cricketer
- Henry Aitken (mayor) (1840–1899), mayor of Oamaru, New Zealand
- Henry Aitken Wise (1835–1922), New Zealand publisher
- Henry Aiken Worcester (1802–1841), American clergyman
