= BBC Radio Orkney =

Radio station in Kirkwall, Scotland

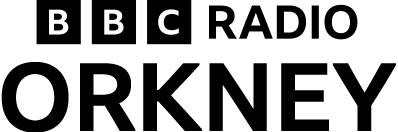
- Kirkwall; Scotland
- Broadcast area: Orkney
- Frequency: (FM: 93.7) MHz
- RDS: BBC_Scot

Programming
- Language: English
- Format: News, music, sport, talk
- Network: BBC Radio Scotland

Ownership
- Owner: BBC
- Operator: BBC Scotland
- Sister stations: BBC Radio Shetland

History
- First air date: 9 May 1977; 49 years ago

Technical information
- Licensing authority: Ofcom
- Transmitter coordinates: 58.9753°N 3.0842°W

Links
- Webcast: BBC Sounds
- Website: BBC Radio Orkney listings

BBC Radio Orkney is a community radio station and local opt-out service of BBC Radio Scotland, covering the Orkney Islands. The station is based in Castle Street, Kirkwall, Orkney, in Scotland.

Depending on the time of year, there are either two or three broadcasts per day on weekdays on the BBC Radio Scotland frequency: the flagship breakfast programme Around Orkney, a short lunchtime news at 12:54 pm featuring local news and weather for Orkney and Shetland, and Radio Orkney's Evening Programme.

From January–March, an evening schedule with weekday programmes air from 6 pm to 7 pm.

The station can be heard on 93.7 FM, online via their website, BBC Sounds and via smart speakers.

== Programming ==
=== Around Orkney ===
Around Orkney is a news programme broadcast weekday mornings from 7:30 am to 8:00 am (opting out from BBC Radio Scotland's Radio Scotland Breakfast), featuring local news, weather, travel, sport, daily diary, job opportunities and mart reports. Every Wednesday there is a "Postbag" section featuring letters sent in by listeners. Radio Orkney produced their first-ever outside broadcasts in summer 2007, from the County Show and the Parish Cup Final. During the Orkney Island Games 2025, Around Orkney was extended from 30 minutes to an hour for one week only, presented by Cameron Stout, Helen Foulis and Rob Flett. An evening programme was also aired.

=== Radio Orkney's Evening Programme ===
Radio Orkney's Evening Programme (often referred to as just the evening programme) is a programme broadcast from 6:10 pm to 7:00 pm from Monday–Thursday between the months of October and May. There are various programmes on the evening schedule, including the regular Monday night Bruck programme (swaps and appeals), a folk music programme (Tuesday Folk)), a country music programme (On The Border), Whassigo (described as "an Orcadian Call My Bluff"), Classic Concert (archive local recordings) and the annual Ba' Quiz.

=== Friday Requests ===
Friday Requests is broadcast on Friday evenings throughout the year. The programme is identical in structure to the Radio Orkney programme except that it plays music which residents of Orkney have requested through the week via phoning a request line, usually dedicated their requests.

== History ==
Celtic rock band Wolfstone wrote a signature tune for BBC Radio Orkney. However, it was ultimately unused and appeared on their second album The Chase (1992) as its first track, "Tinnie Run".

Former Radio Orkney presenter and editor Dave Gray died suddenly on 21 February 2024 following a short illness. He was 63. Tributes were shared across social media from family, friends, colleagues and listeners. BBC Scotland News managing editor, Peter MacRae, said "The Orkney audience took Dave to their hearts because he was the same person on air as off. He was passionate about Orkney and local journalism and a strong advocate for maintaining the BBC's commitment to Scotland's rural communities."

== See also ==
- BBC Radio Shetland
