= Dave Gray (broadcaster) =

Former British broadcaster

- Born: David Gray; 9 January 1961; Kirkwall, Scotland
- Died: 21 February 2024 (aged 63); Edinburgh, Scotland
- Occupation: Broadcaster
- Years active: 1990-2024
- Career
- Station: BBC Radio Orkney
- Style: Former radio presenter and journalist

David Gray (9 January 1961 – 21 February 2024) was a Scottish broadcaster, journalist, senior producer and news editor at BBC Radio Orkney. He was one of the station’s most popular presenters, and was a public figure in Orkney until his death.

== Career ==
Gray was born in Kirkwall, Scotland. Gray started his career as a mechanic, fixing cars in a garage across from the BBC studio in Kirkwall. He then joined BBC Radio Orkney in Orkney, Scotland, and spent over thirty years at the station. From 2008 to 2021, Gray was the News Editor. Throughout his long career at the BBC, Gray presented various programmes on the station, starting with a metal programme, titled Metallic Gray, before working on their flagship news programme Around Orkney each weekday morning. Gray also interviewed many guests from the island, with an 'In Conversation' programme. Gray retired in 2021. Following the announcement of his retirement, Metallic Gray was brought back for a special edition under the title 60 Shades of Metallic Gray. He briefly returned in 2024 to do six weeks holiday cover.

Gray hosted various different events across Orkney, including for Orkney's Business Festival in 2016.

In 2021, Gray was a guest on the BBC podcast Scotland Outdoors for BBC Radio Scotland.

== Death ==
Gray died suddenly in an Edinburgh hospital on 21 February 2024 following a short illness. He was 63. Tributes were shared across social media from family, friends, colleagues and listeners. BBC Scotland News managing editor, Peter MacRae, said "The Orkney audience took Dave to their hearts because he was the same person on air as off. He was passionate about Orkney and local journalism and a strong advocate for maintaining the BBC's commitment to Scotland's rural communities." Gray interviewed ITV broadcaster Lorraine Kelly shortly before his death, with Kelly paying tribute on Instagram, "Just heard the very sad news that BBC Radio Orkney legend Dave Gray has died. I saw him just two weeks ago when I was in Orkney and we had a great chat. He will be sorely missed - my sincere condolences to his family and all of his friends."

== Legacy ==
Gray remains a well known figure in Orkney. Programmes and interviews presented by him have occasionally been repeated on BBC Radio Orkney. The February 2025 edition of compilation programme Orkney Prime Cuts, broadcast on 27th February 2025, was produced as a tribute to Gray. During the hour long programme, the previously untransmitted pilot of the radio comedy Portree Broadcasting Corporation was aired for the first time. It was recorded in 2004, and features Gray and other BBC radio presenters in Scotland.
