= Gilbert Bain Hospital =

- NHS Shetland
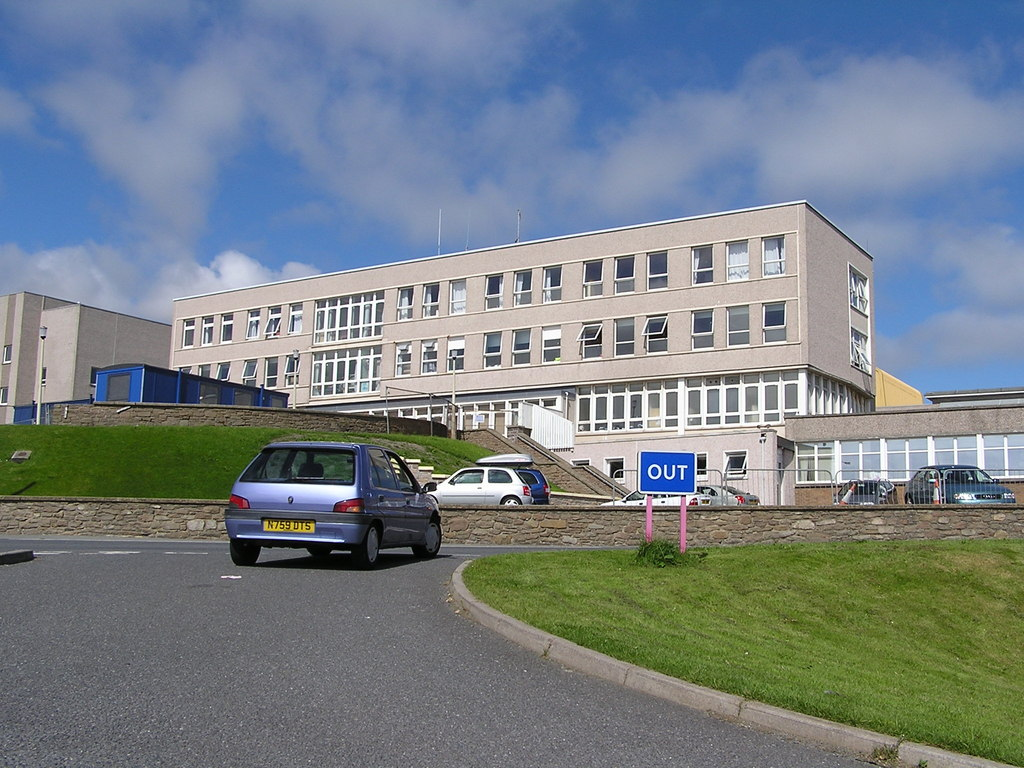
- The modern Gilbert Bain Hospital

- Shown in Shetland

Geography
- Location: Lerwick, Shetland, Scotland, United Kingdom
- Coordinates: 60.1510°N 1.1563°W

Organisation
- Care system: NHS Scotland
- Type: General

Services
- Emergency department: Yes
- Beds: 56

History
- Founded: 1901

Links
- Website: Official website

The Gilbert Bain Hospital is a rural general hospital in the burgh of Lerwick, Shetland, Scotland. It is managed by NHS Shetland.

== History ==
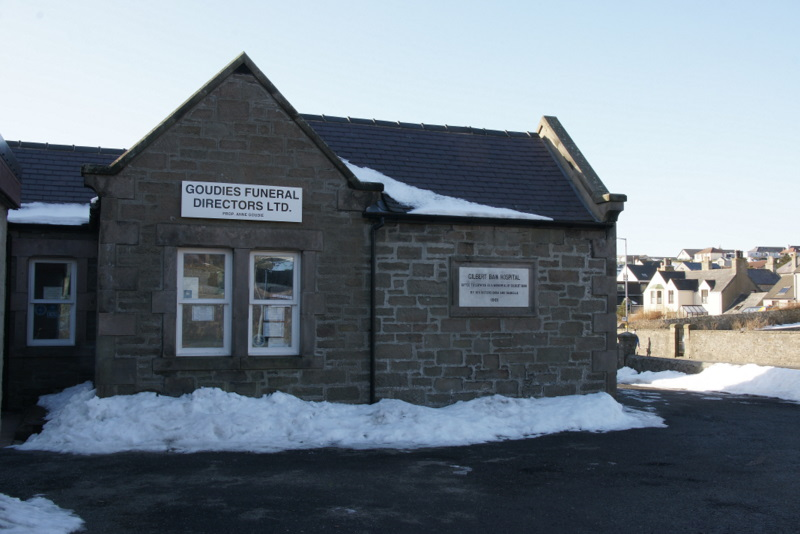
The former Gilbert Bain Hospital on King Harald Street

The hospital has its origins in a small cottage hospital which was funded by Gilbert Bain, a businessman who had spent his working life in India and Singapore. It was built on King Harald Street and completed in 1901. It joined the National Health Service in 1948.

The foundation stone for a new hospital was laid in April 1959. The new facility, which was designed by William Arthur Baird Laing and built on the site of a former infectious diseases hospital, was opened by Queen Elizabeth The Queen Mother in August 1961.

A CT scanner was installed in 2007 and an existing ward was refurbished, creating new accommodation for up to 16 long-stay patients, in 2008.

In February 2014 the board decided to fund additional consultant physician and anaesthetist posts.

In October 2019 the hospital was deemed "not fit for purpose" following an audit by the board, which found that while the hospital was well-maintained it would cost around £10 million to deal with the maintenance backlog, and that this would still not deal with issues such as the size of departmental areas of the limited opportunity for expansion on the current site. In 2021 the Shetland Islands Council published proposals to construct a new hospital within five years.

== Facilities ==
The hospital has 56 staffed beds and two operating theatres.

== Services ==
The hospital has approximately 140 births per year and it has had full accreditation as baby friendly since January 2003.

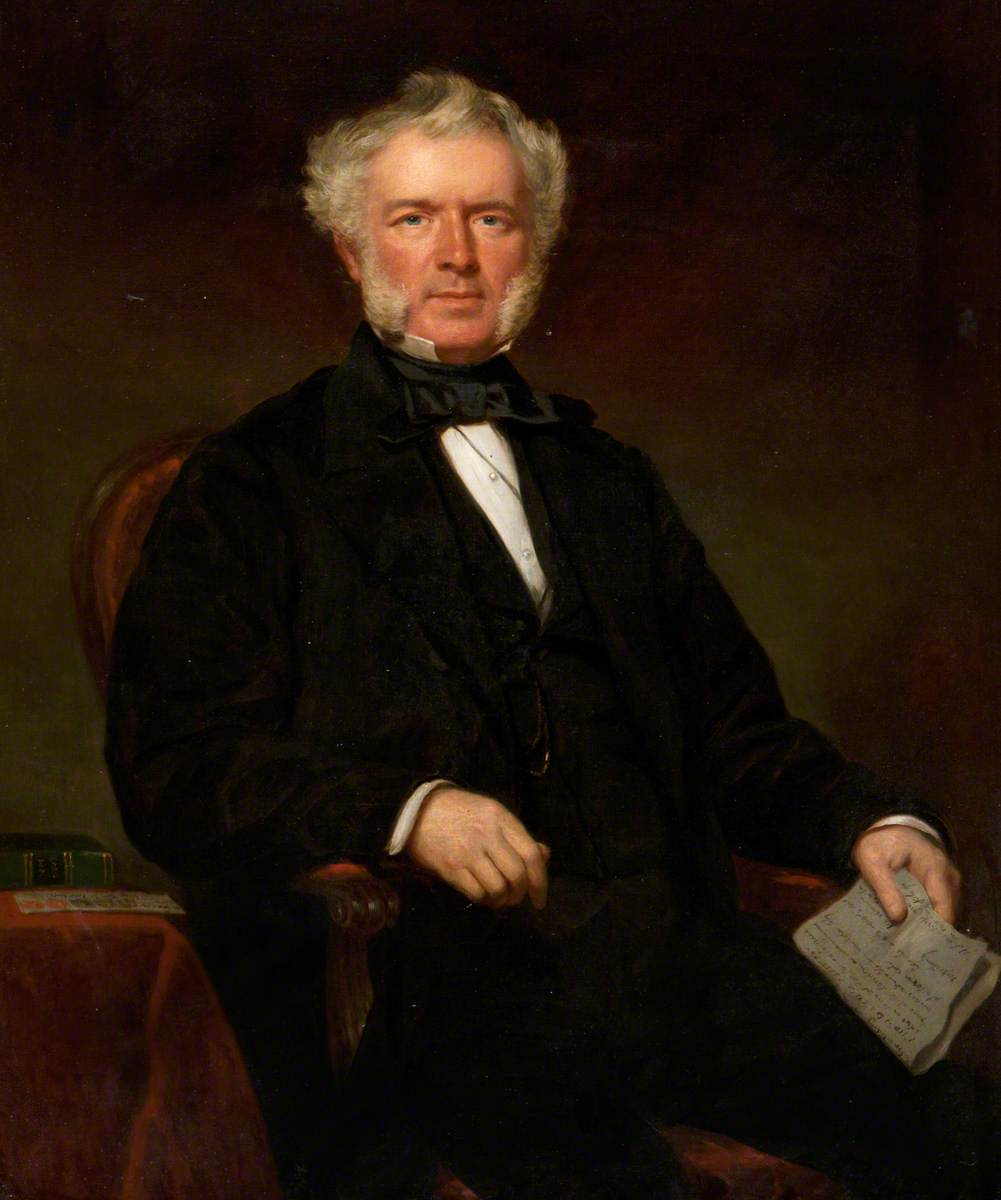
Gilbert Bain
