= Lerwick =

Town in Shetland, Scotland

Lerwick: Scottish Gaelic: Liùrabhaig; Scots: Lerook
- Town and administrative centre
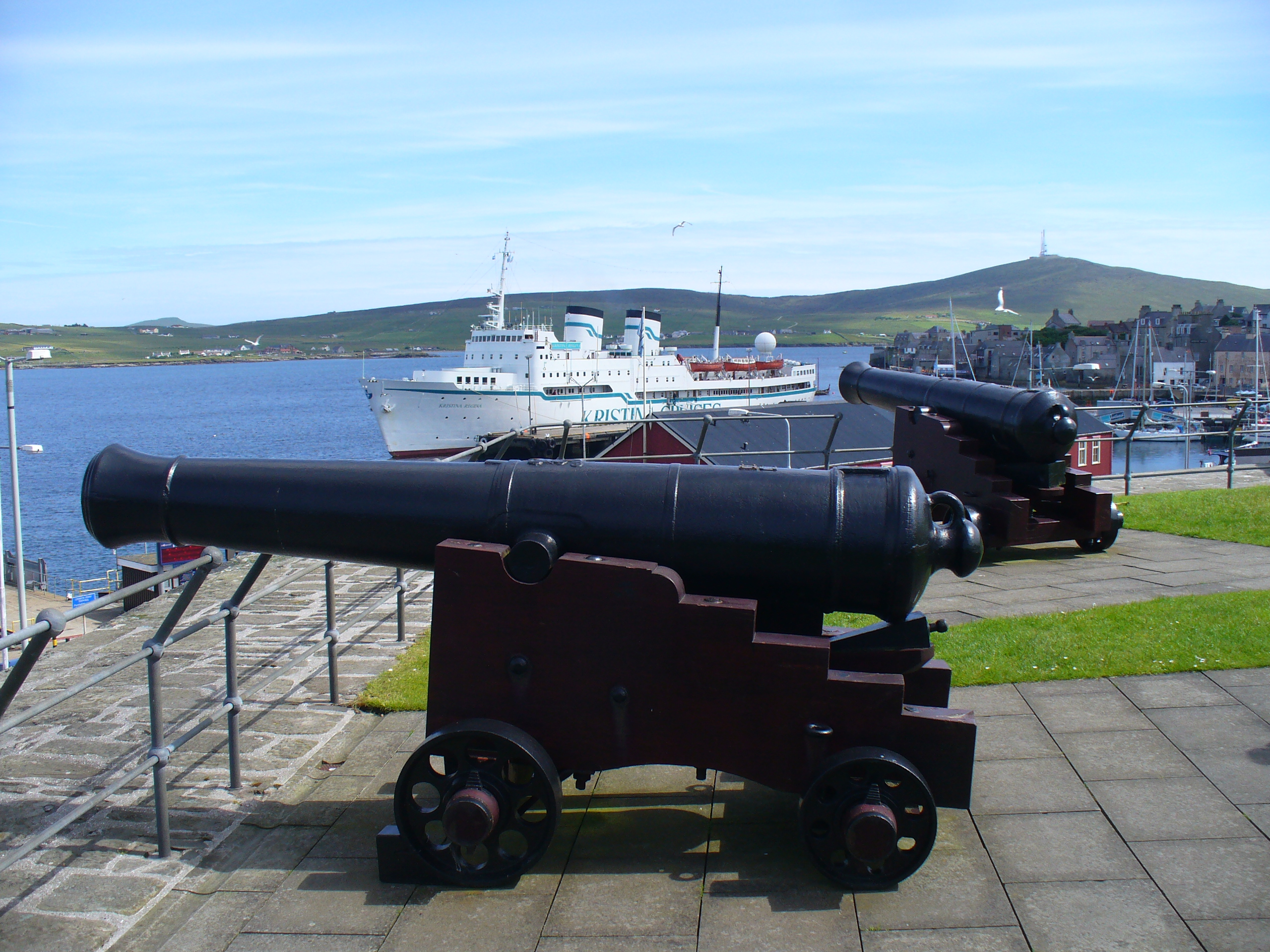
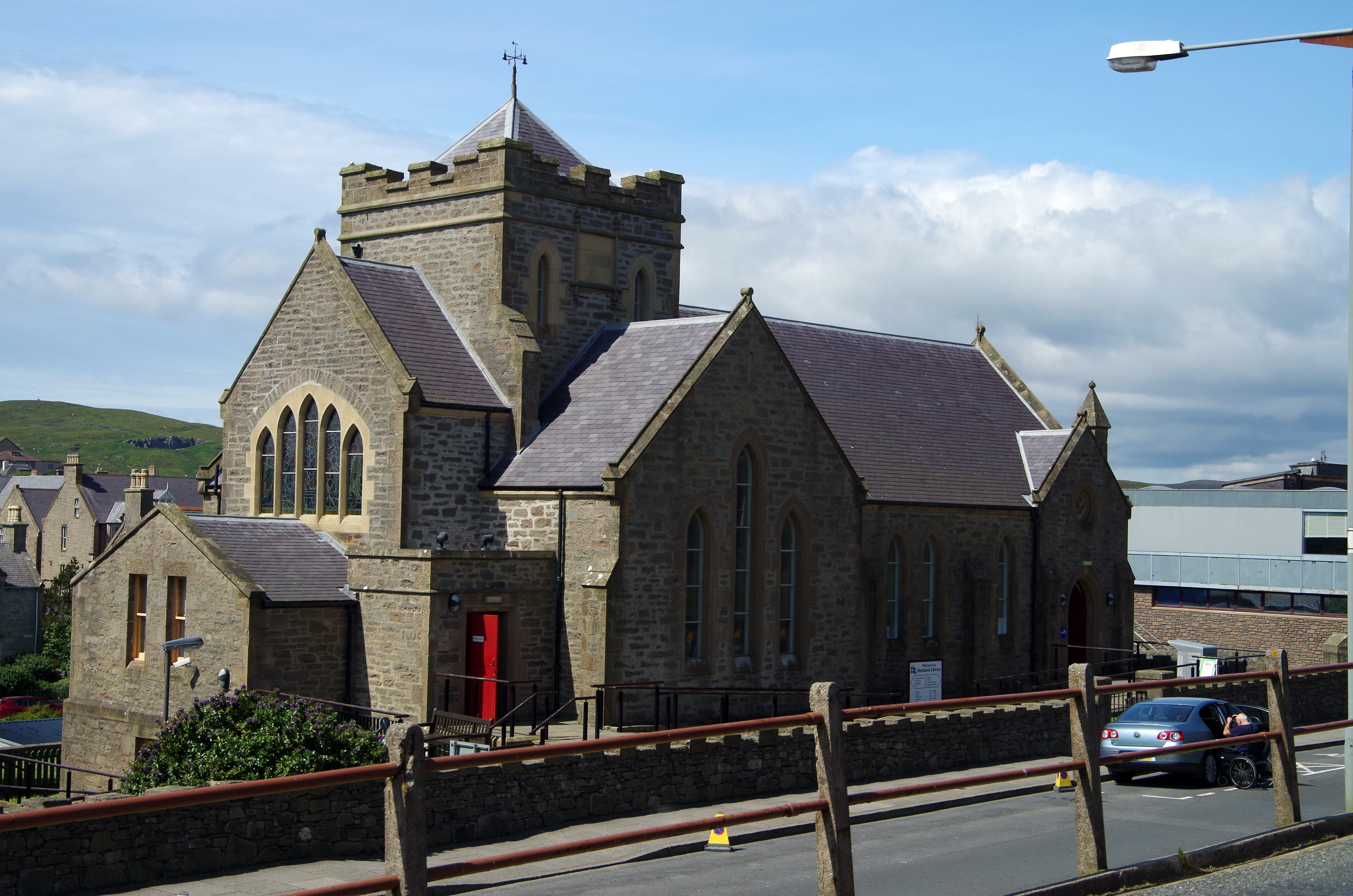
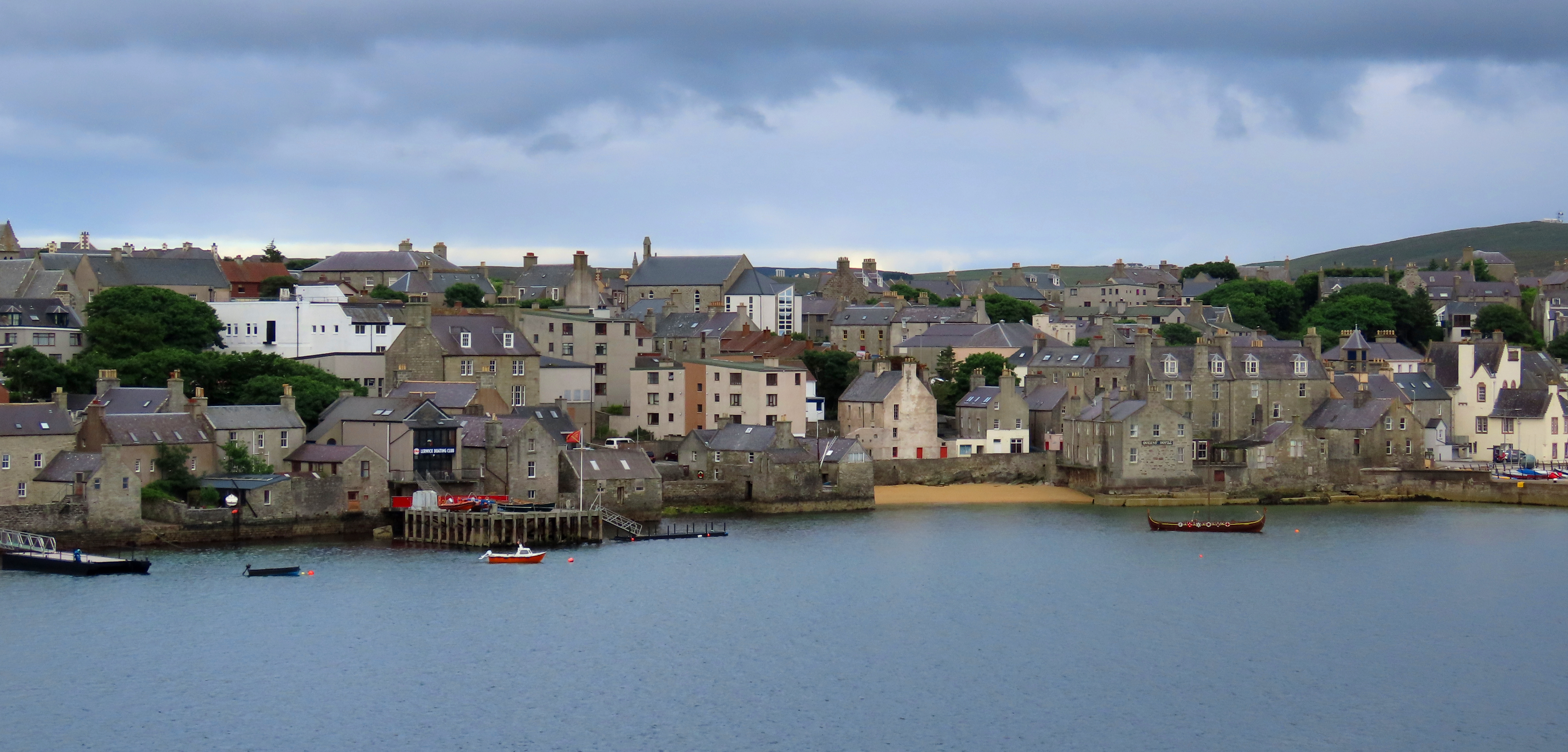
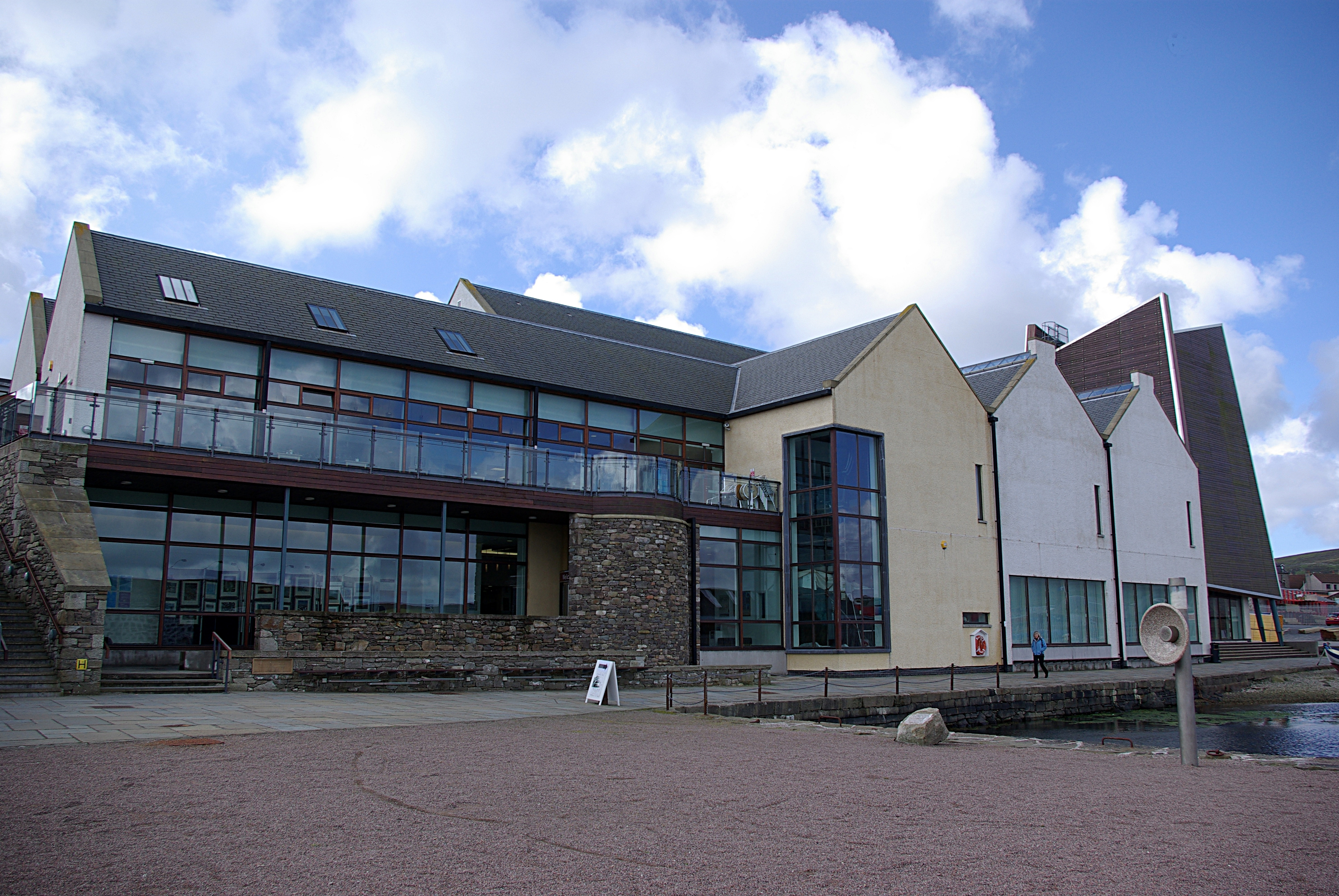
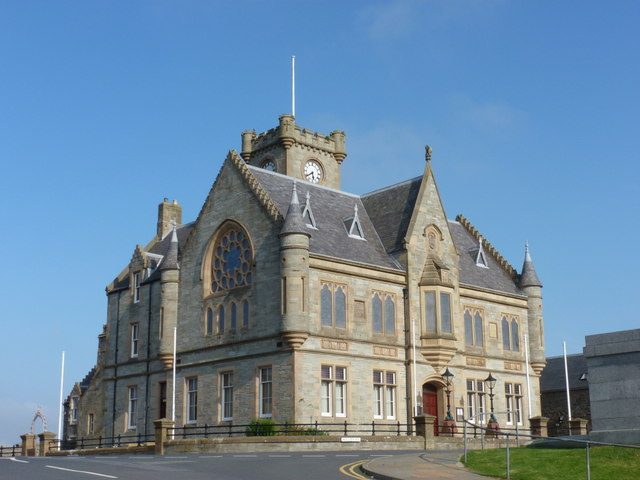
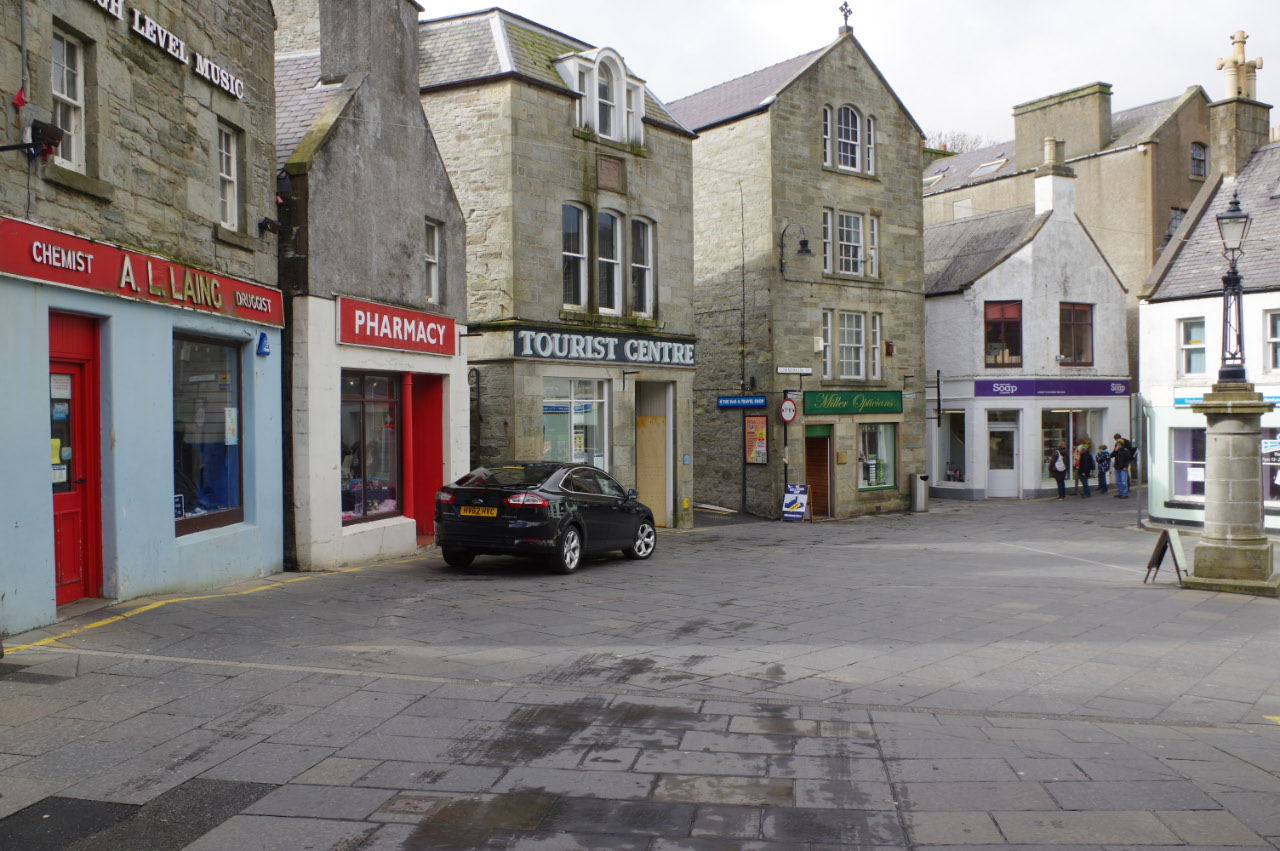
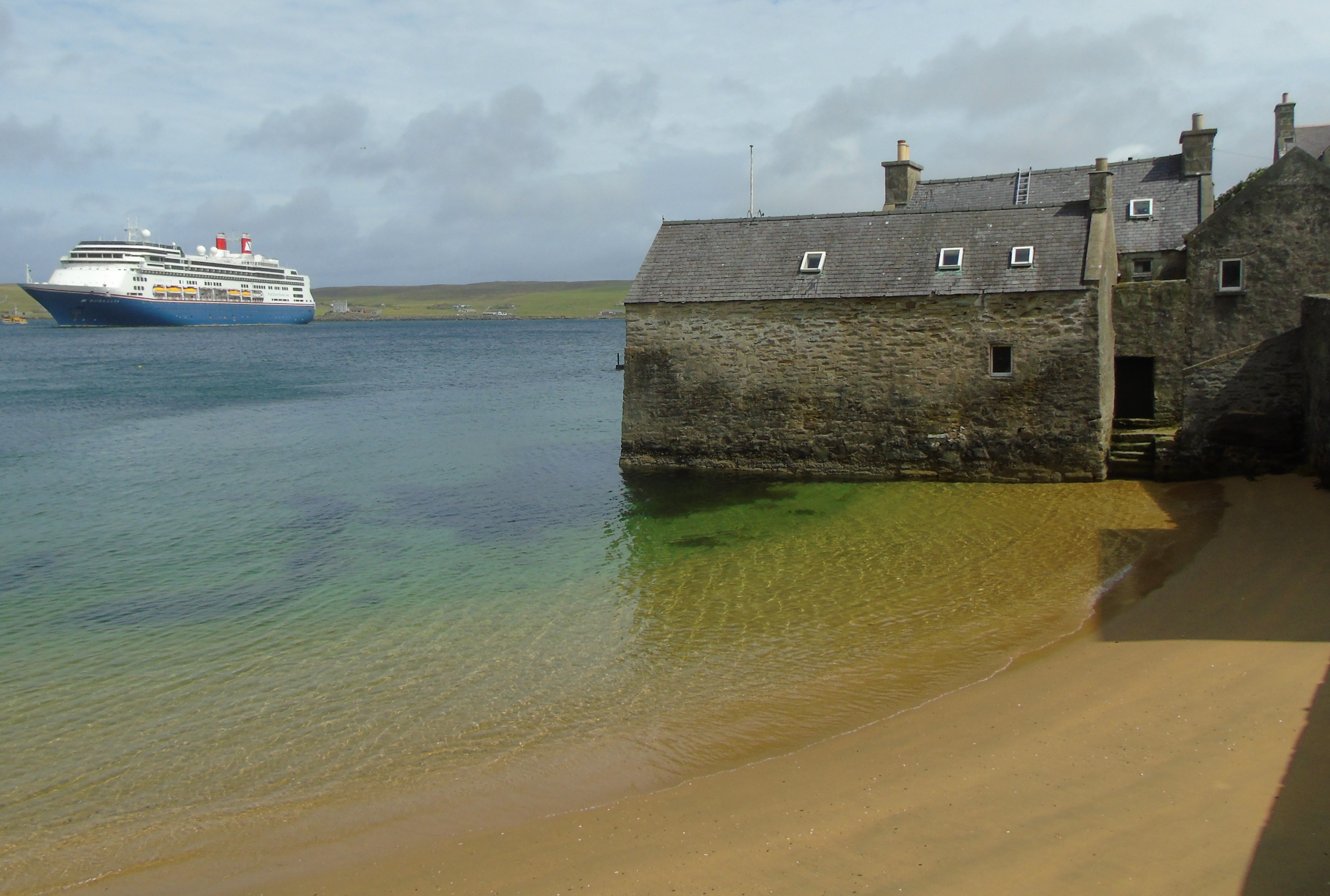
- Fort Charlotte Shetland Library The Lodberries Shetland Museum Lerwick Town Hall Commercial Street Bain's Beach

- Location within Shetland
- Area: 3.15 km^{2} (1.22 sq mi)
- Population: 6,709 (2022)
  - Density: 2,130/km^{2} (5,500/sq mi)
- OS grid reference: HU474414
  - Edinburgh: 300 miles (480 km)
  - London: 600 miles (970 km)
- Civil parish: Lerwick
- Council area: Shetland
- Lieutenancy area: Shetland
- Country: Scotland
- Sovereign state: United Kingdom
- Post town: SHETLAND
- Postcode district: ZE1
- Dialling code: 01595
- Police: Scotland
- Fire: Scottish
- Ambulance: Scottish
- UK Parliament: Orkney and Shetland
- Scottish Parliament: Shetland

Lerwick (Note: Shaetlan pronunciation: [ˈlɛrᵻk] LEH-rik, [ˈlɛrwik] LER-week or [ˈlɛruk] LER-ook; Old Norse: Leirvik; Norn: Larvik), Scots: Lerook) is a port town and burgh in Shetland, Scotland. It is the main town of the Shetland archipelago, and has a population of 6,709 in 2022. It is the northernmost major settlement within the United Kingdom.

Centred 123 miles (200 km) off the north coast of the Scottish mainland and on the east coast of the Shetland Mainland, Lerwick lies 211 miles (340 km) north-by-northeast of Aberdeen; 222 miles (357 km) west of the similarly sheltered port of Bergen in Norway; and 228 miles (367 km) south east of Tórshavn in the Faroe Islands. (Note: All of these distances are greater by sea as there are varying amounts of intervening land.) One of the UK's coastal weather stations is situated there, with the local climate having small seasonal variation due to the maritime influence. Being located further north than Saint Petersburg and three of the four mainland Nordic capitals, and on the same latitude as Anchorage, Alaska, Lerwick's nights in the middle of summer only get dark twilight and winters have less than six hours of complete daylight.

== History ==
Lerwick is a name with roots in Old Norse and its local descendant, Norn, which was spoken in Shetland until the mid-19th century. The name "Lerwick" means bay of clay. The corresponding Norwegian name is Leirvik, leir meaning clay and vik meaning "bay" or "inlet". Towns with similar names exist in southwestern Norway (Leirvik, Lervik) and on the Faroe Islands (Leirvík).

Evidence of human settlement in the Lerwick area dates back to the Neolithic (4000–2500 BC) and the Bronze Age (2500–800 BC) known from paleoenvironmental records for human activity and the recovery of artefacts, including a stone axe head submerged in Bressay Sound. Iron Age (800 BC – AD 800) settlement is known at the Broch of Clickimin, which was constructed as early as 400 BC. The first settlement to be known as Lerwick was founded in the 17th century as a herring and white fish seaport to trade with the Dutch fishing fleet. This settlement was on the mainland (west) side of Bressay Sound, a natural harbour with south and north entrances between the Shetland mainland and the island of Bressay. Its collection of wooden huts was burned to the ground twice: once in the 17th century by the residents of Scalloway on the western side of Mainland, then the capital of Shetland, who disapproved of the immoral and drunken activities of the assembled fishermen and sailors; again in 1702 by the French fleet.

Fort Charlotte was built in the mid 17th century on Lerwick's waterfront, and permanent stone-built buildings began to be erected around the fort and along the shoreline. The principal concentration of buildings was in the "lanes" area: a steep hillside stretching from the shoreline to Hillhead at the top. Lerwick became capital of the Shetland Islands in 1708, taking over the function from Scalloway. The civil parish of Lerwick had been in 1701 created from a small part of the parish of Tingwall, to which Scalloway still belongs. When Lerwick became more prosperous through sea trade and the fishing industry during the 19th century, the town expanded in 1891 to the west of Hillhead, thereby including the former civil parishes of Gulberwick and Quarff, as well as the islands parish of Burra. Lerwick Town Hall was built during this period of expansion.

Lerwick war memorial dates from 1923 and was designed by Sir Robert Lorimer. The next period of significant expansion was during the North Sea oil boom of the 1970s when large housing developments were built to the north of Staney Hill (located in Lerwick) and to the south (Nederdale and Sandveien).

The OS Map of Lerwick from 1902 shows that at that time there were a large number of small piers near and in Lerwick, most of them located in the north of the town. The statistics show that while there were major fluctuations in the quantity of fish caught, Lerwick maintained its position as the main herring port in Shetland, while Balta Sound declined. The steam drifters which came to dominate the Shetland fishery were able to make their way to Lerwick from most of the fishing grounds, and there they benefited from a well-established market for their catch:

Fishery statistics

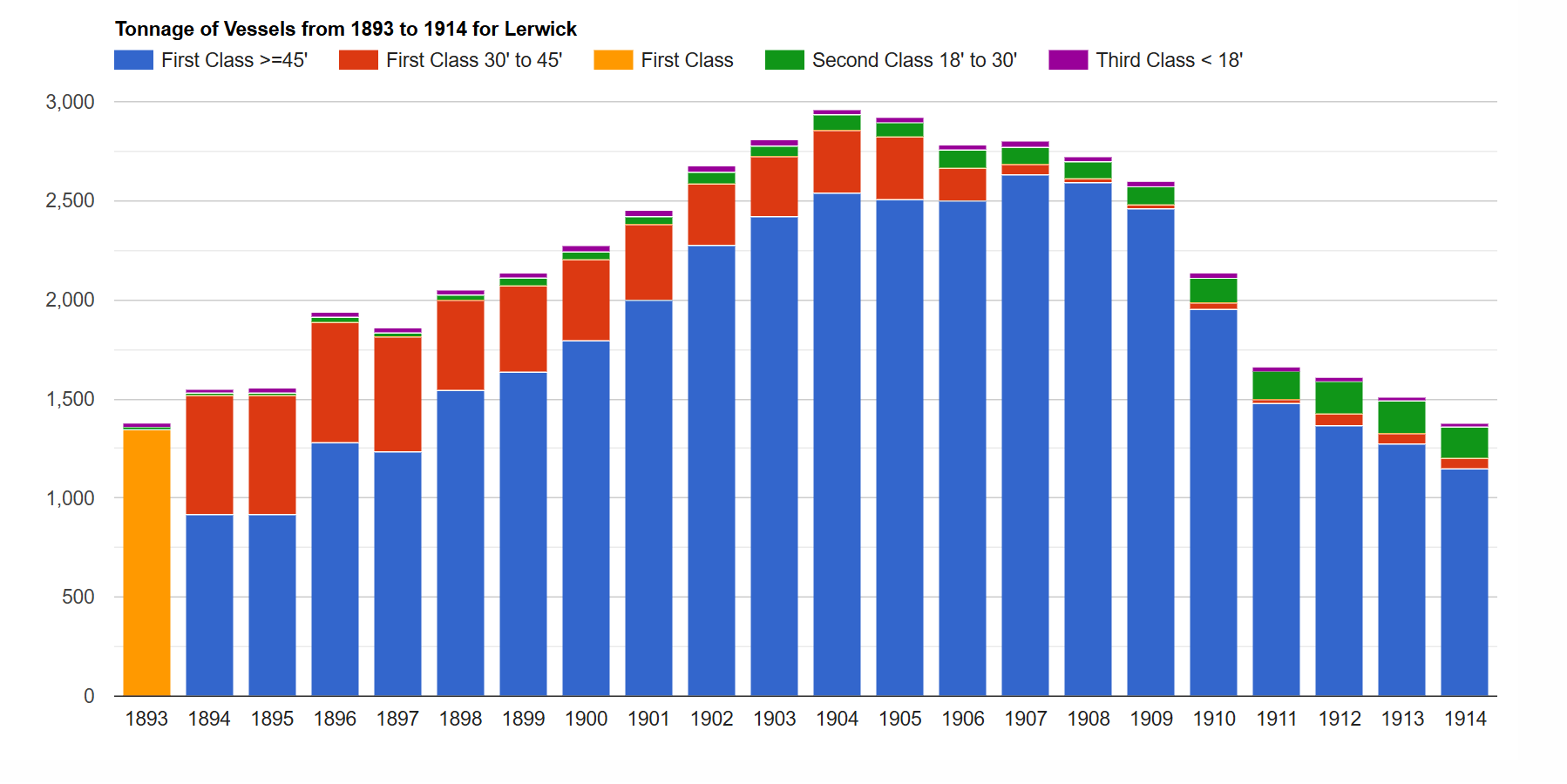
Tonnage of vessels

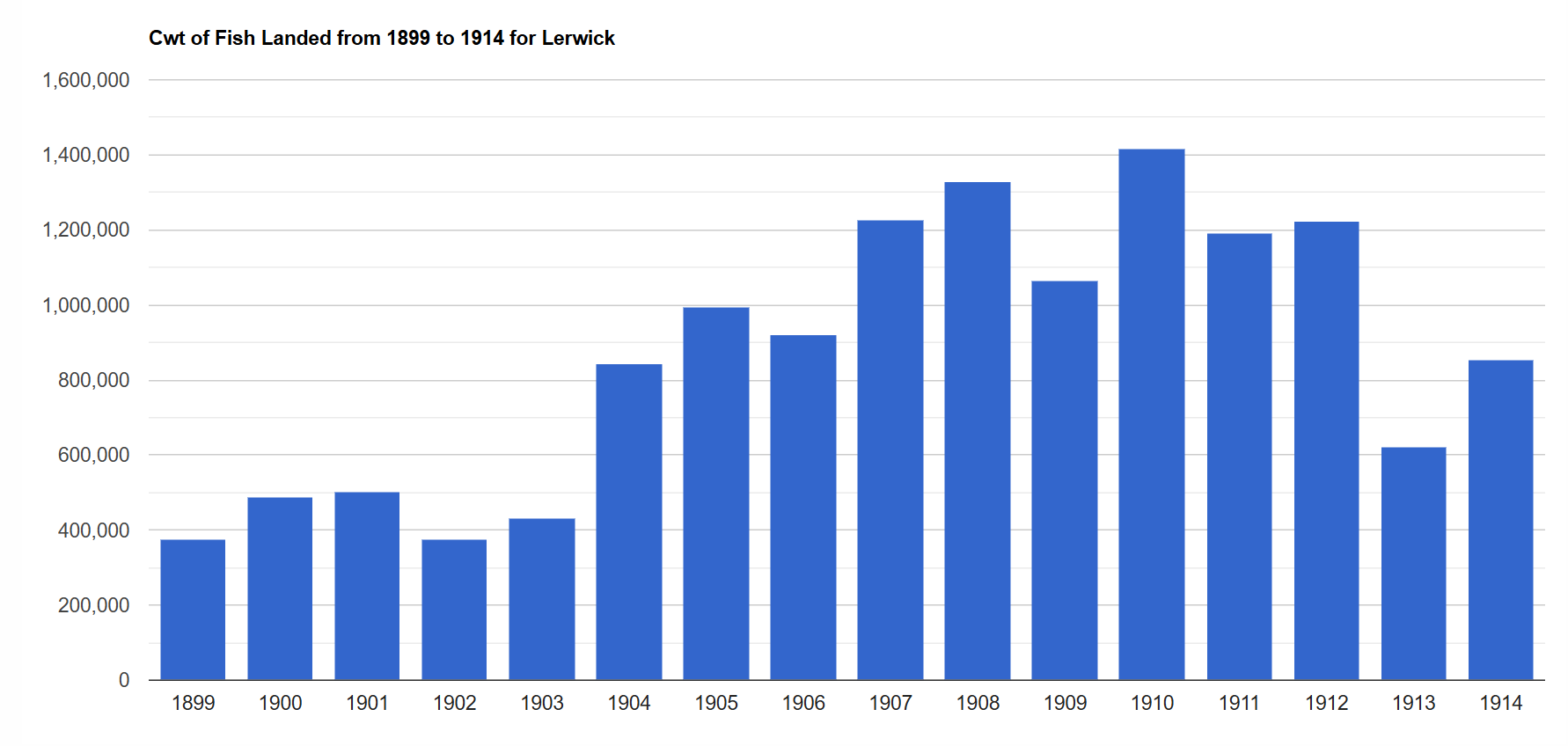
Cwt of fish landed

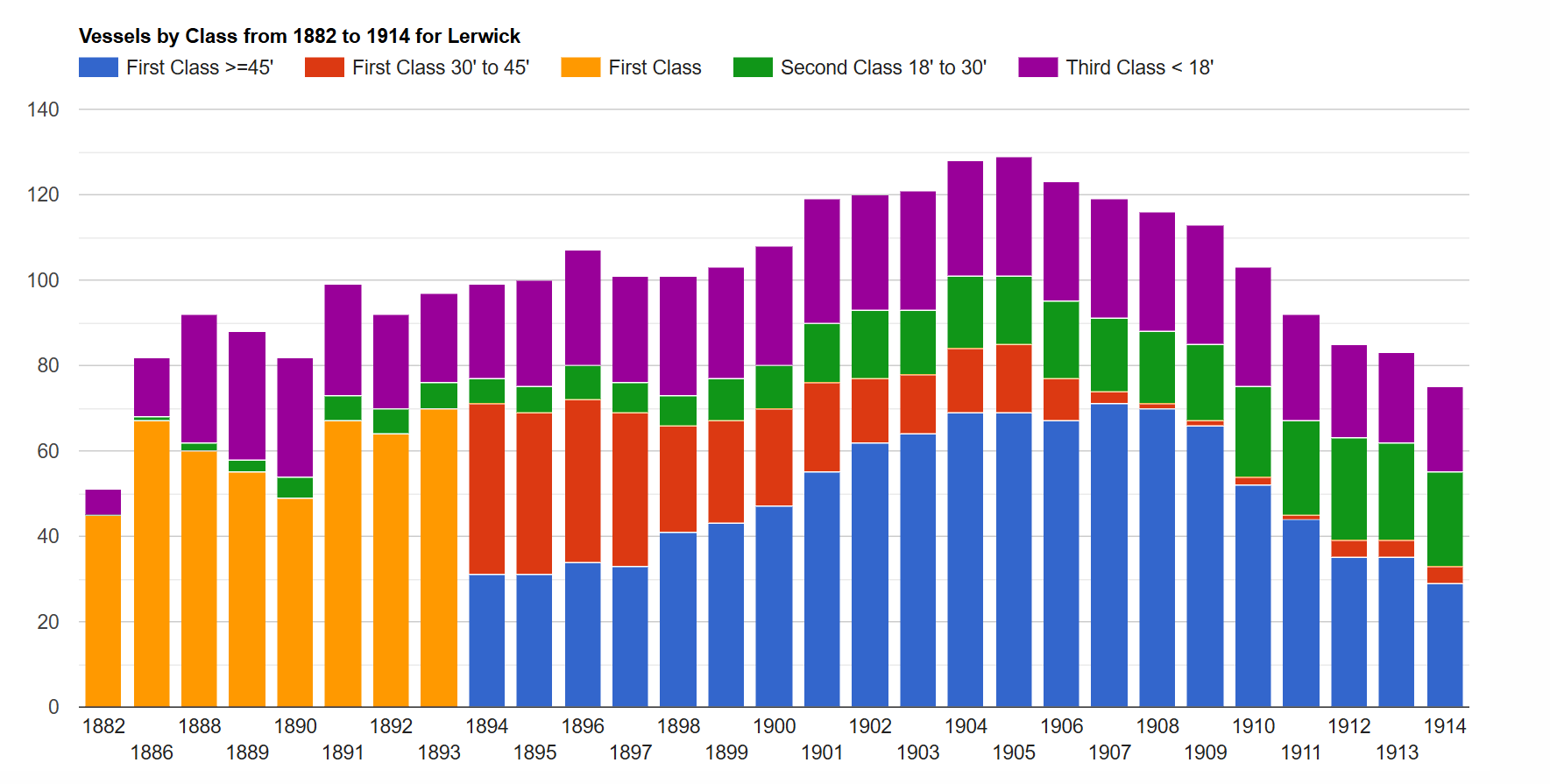
Vessels by class

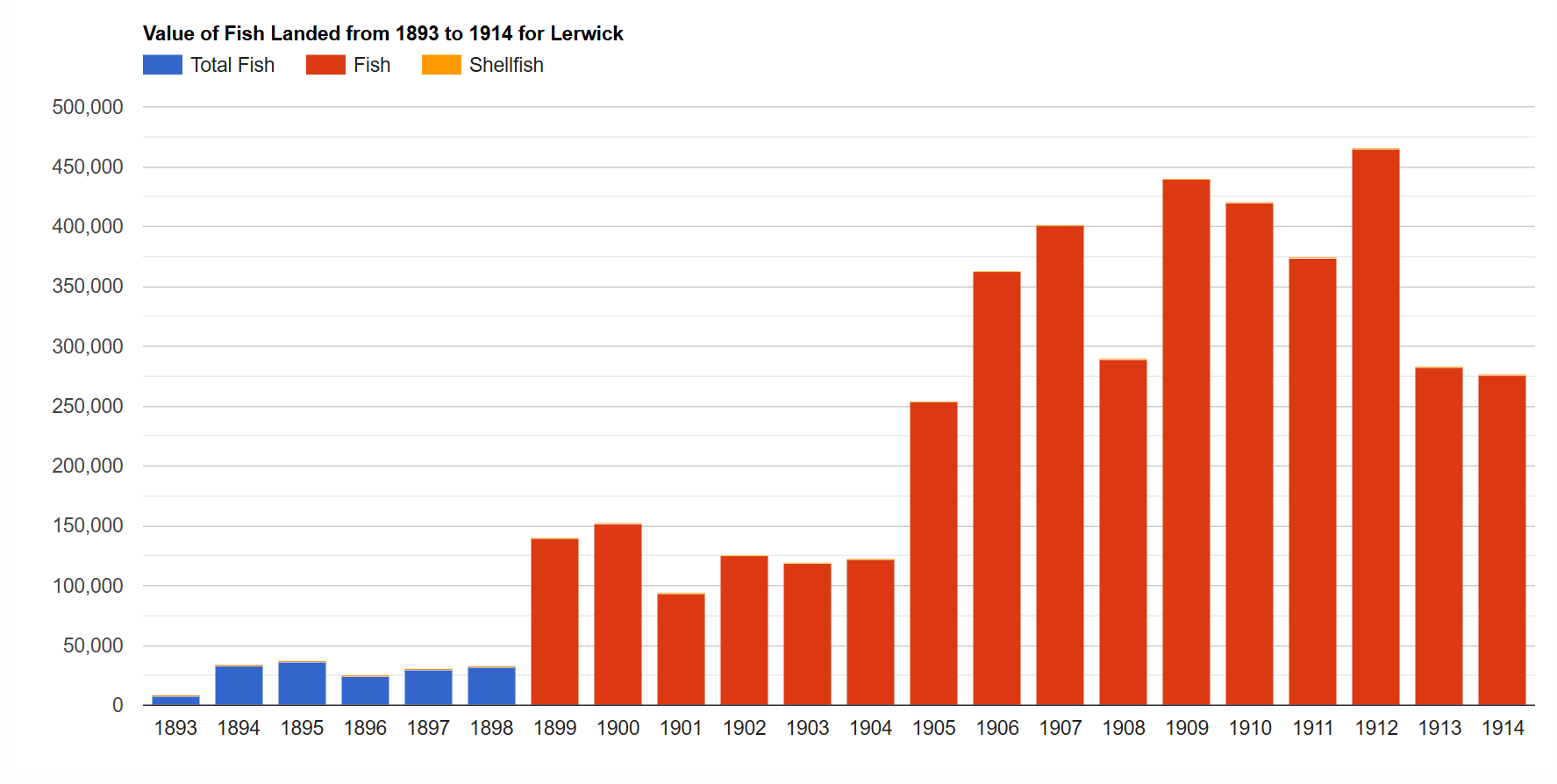
Value (£] of fish landed

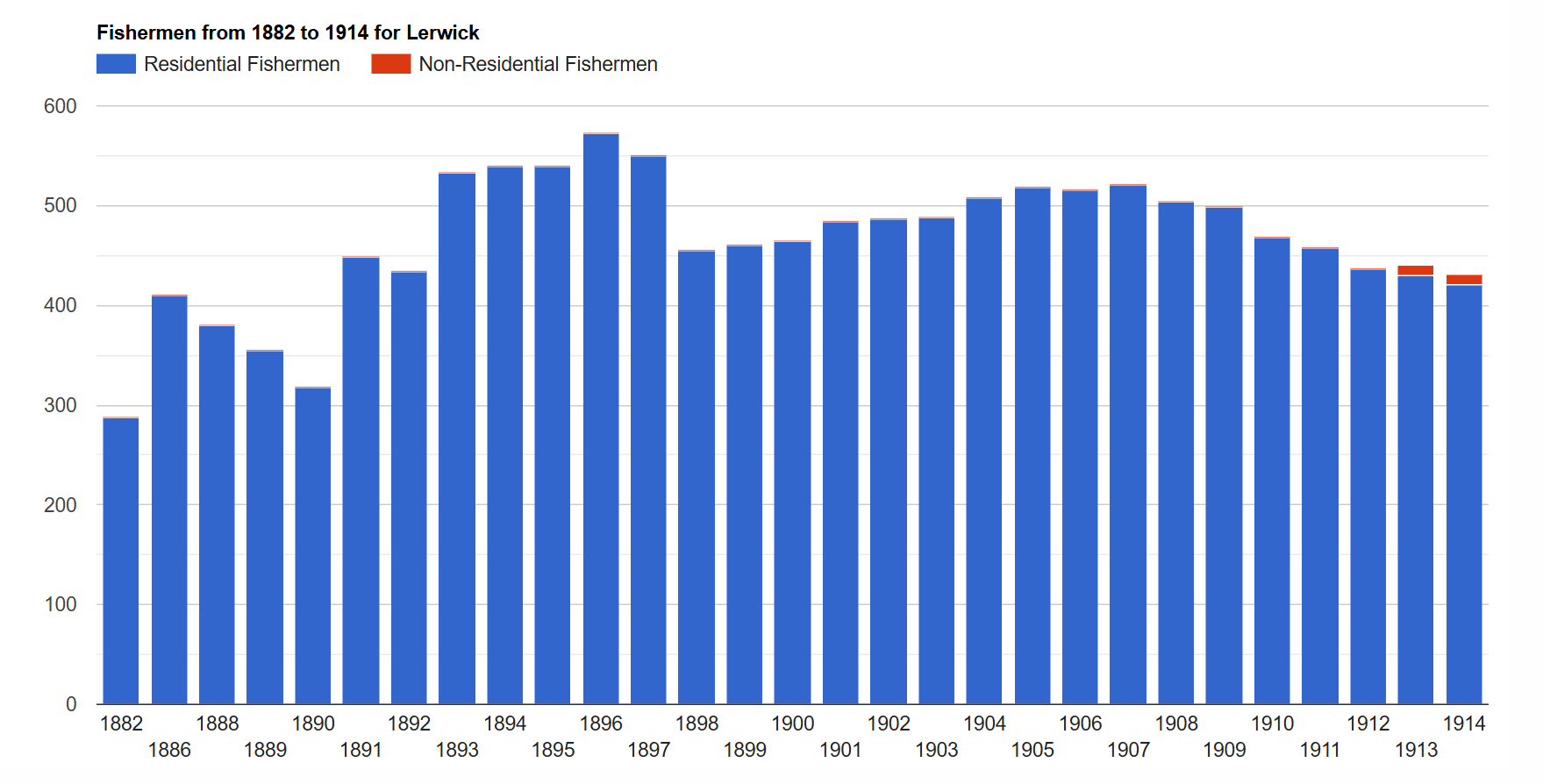
Fishermen

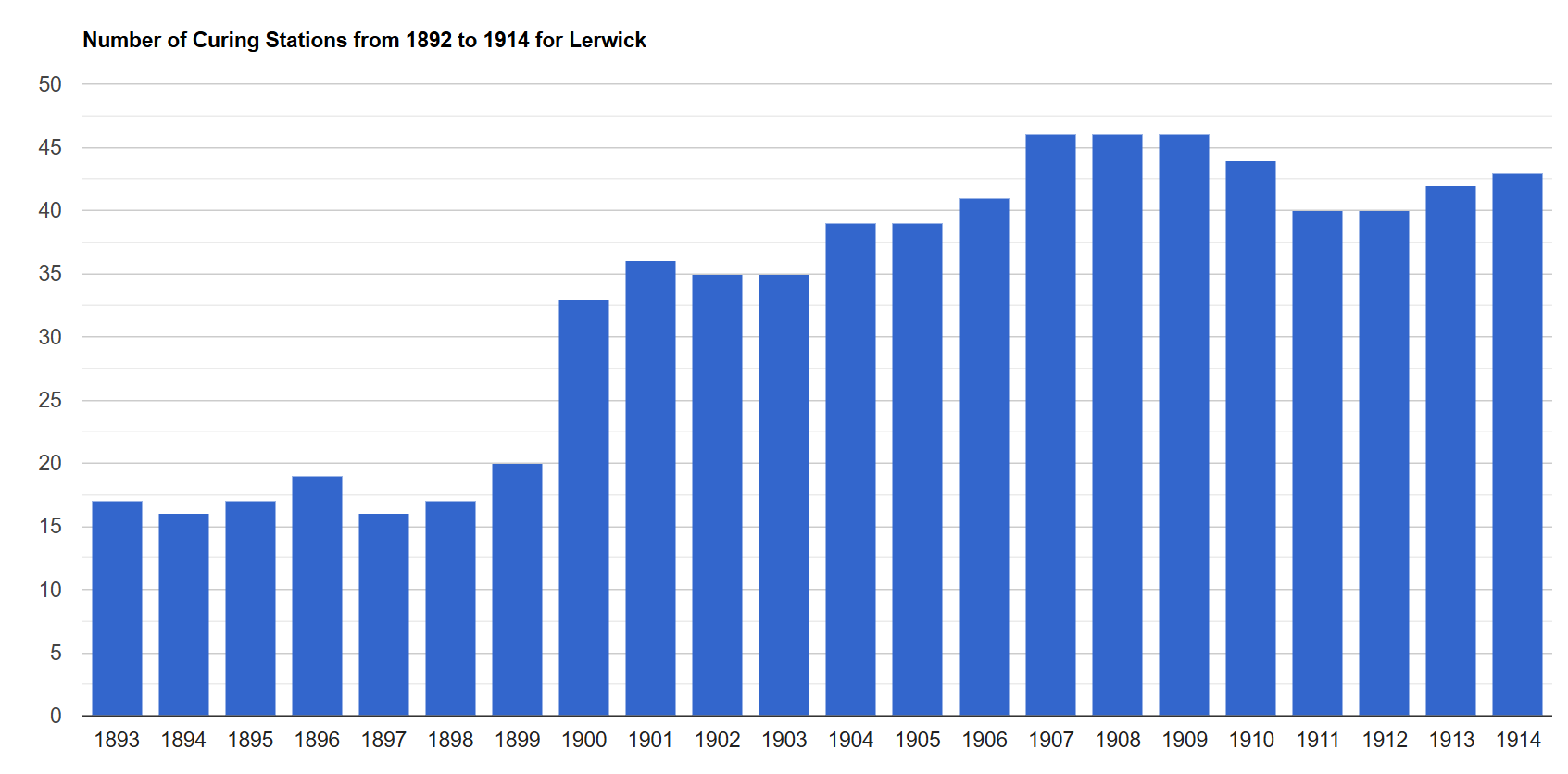
Number of curing stations

=== Provosts of Lerwick ===
The Provost of Lerwick was the head of the Lerwick Town Council. Provosts were elected by the council and served not only as the chairman of that body, but as a figurehead for the entire town. They were equivalent in many ways to the institution of mayor. The council was established in 1818 and abolished in 1975, when it merged with the Zetland County Council to become the Shetland Islands Council.

Years	Name	Title	Occupation
1818–1823	Arthur Edmondston	Senior Bailie	Doctor
1823–1827	Charles Ogilvy Snr	Senior Bailie	Merchant
1827–1829	William Spence	Junior Bailie; Acting as Senior Bailie	Royal Navy staff-surgeon
1829–1832	William Spence	Senior Bailie	Royal Navy staff-surgeon
1832–1844	Charles Ogilvy Jr	Senior Bailie	Merchant
1844–1847	Joseph Leask	Junior Bailie; Acting as Senior Bailie	Merchant
1847–1856	William Sievwright Snr	Senior Bailie	Solicitor
1856–1862	Charles Gilbert Duncan	Senior Bailie	Solicitor, Bank Agent
1862–1865	Joseph Leask	Senior Bailie	Merchant
1865–1874	Charles Gilbert Duncan	Senior Bailie	Solicitor, Bank Agent
1874–1876	William Sievwright Jr	Senior Bailie	Solicitor
1876–1883	Major Thomas Cameron	Chief Magistrates	Military officer
1883–1890	John Robertson	Chief Magistrates	Merchant
1890–1895	Charles Robertson	Provost/Chief Magistrate	Merchant
1895–1904	John Leisk	Provost	Merchant
1904–1907	James Mouat Goudie	Provost	Ironworks merchant
1907–1910	Arthur Porteous	Provost	Chemist
1910–1913	Arthur Laing	Provost	Pharmacist
1913–1915	Robert Stout	Provost	Postmaster
1915–1920	Peter Scott Goodlad	Provost	Shoemaker
1920–1924	Robert D. Ganson	Provost	Motor dealer
1924–1927	James Laing	Provost	Stonemason
1927–1930	John T. J. Sinclair	Provost	Fisheries merchant
1930–1933	William Sinclair	Provost	Baker
1933–1936	Robert Ollason	Provost	Stationer
1936–1941	James A. Smith	Provost	Merchant
1941–1946	Magnus Shearer	Provost	Wholesale merchant
1946–1950	James Aitken	Provost	Insurance agent
1950–1953	Robert A. Anderson	Provost	Oil depot surveyor
1953–1956	George Burgess	Provost	Wholesale grocer
1956–1959	William Conochie	Provost	Stationer
1959–1962	Robert Blance	Provost	Post Office clerk
1962–1965	Harry Gray	Provost	
1965–1967	Andrew Nicolson	Provost	Post Office clerk
1967–1971	Eric Gray	Provost	Draper
1971–1974	William 'Bill' Smith	Provost	Post Office engineer
1974–1975	James Taylor	Provost	Merchant

== Climate ==
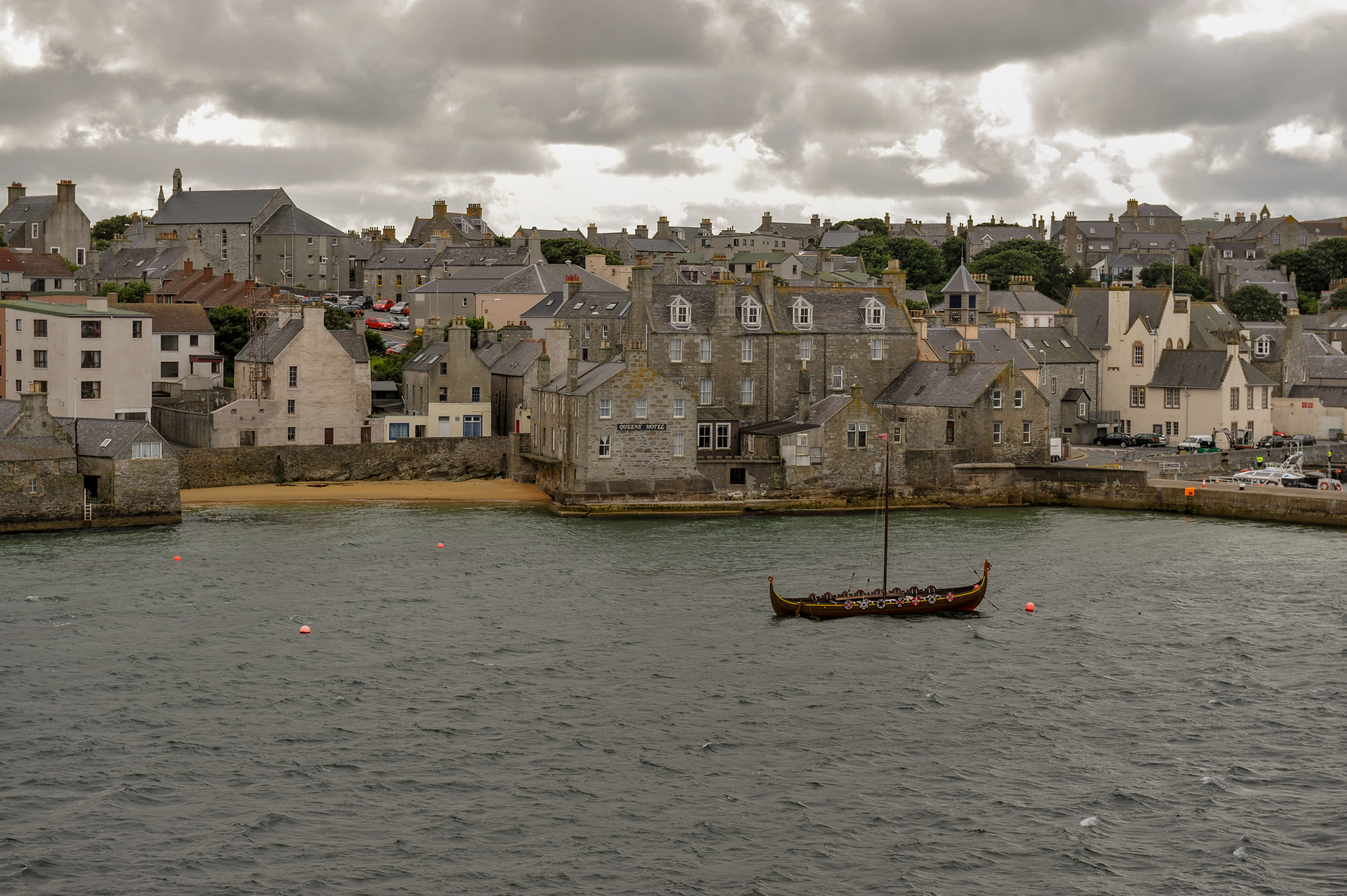
Lerwick in August 2010

Lerwick has recently transitioned from a subpolar oceanic climate (Cfc) to a maritime climate (Cfb, yet closely bordering on Cfc), with cool to cold temperatures all year long. The lack of trees is mostly due to humans clearing the islands for grazing and agriculture thousands of years ago.

Lerwick is a very cloudy town, averaging only 1,158 sunshine hours annually (about 13 percent of a year). February is the coldest month, with high temperatures averaging around 5.8 °C (42.4 °F). In August, the warmest month, average high temperatures are 14.7 °C (58.5 °F). This produces an extremely narrow difference for an area north of the 60th parallel. In average monthly precipitation, October to January are the year's wettest months, with over 130 mm (5.1 in) of precipitation each month; May and June are the driest months, with average monthly precipitation less than 60 mm (2.4 in) each. Snowfall can occur, primarily from December to March, but snow accumulation is rarely heavy and usually short-lived. The exposed North Atlantic location and proximity to autumn and winter storm tracks means high winds are a regular occurrence, alongside high levels of cloudiness and precipitation. Temperatures are likely to be slightly milder in the town centre at sea level, as the weather station is at an elevation of 82 metres (269 ft).

Owing to its northerly location, winter months are extremely dark in Lerwick. On the day of the winter solstice it gets only 5 hours and 49 minutes of daylight. In sharp contrast daylight lasts 18 hours and 55 minutes on the day of the summer solstice. As a result, nights never get completely dark for a period of time in summer, with dark blue elements remaining in the sky. The maritime influence tempers the climate effects of these swings in daylight, but in many areas of the world this latitude has hostile winters. Farther north in the world, only the Faroe Islands and a few places in Norway like Kinn have such high January averages as Lerwick and fellow Shetland station at Baltasound – with the warm Atlantic currents preventing ice formation. Only when temperatures in continental areas are record cold does Lerwick experience some cold as was the case in December 2010 during the severe cold wave affecting the British Isles and Europe that covered much of mainland UK in snow. Even so, average highs remained above 3 °C (37 °F) and frosts were light. Mild summers are also rare with the warmest recorded month being July 2006 at an average high of 16 °C (61 °F).

Climate data for Lerwick (S. Screen) (Note: Weather station is located 1.7 miles (2.7 km) from the Lerwick port centre.) WMO ID: 03005; coordinates 60°08′20″N 1°11′06″W; elevation 82 m (269 ft); 1991–2020 normals, extremes 1930–present
Month	Jan	Feb	Mar	Apr	May	Jun	Jul	Aug	Sep	Oct	Nov	Dec	Year
Record high °C (°F)	12.8 (55.0)	11.7 (53.1)	13.3 (55.9)	16.1 (61.0)	20.7 (69.3)	22.2 (72.0)	23.4 (74.1)	22.1 (71.8)	20.7 (69.3)	17.2 (63.0)	13.9 (57.0)	12.6 (54.7)	23.4 (74.1)
Mean maximum °C (°F)	9.1 (48.4)	8.9 (48.0)	9.9 (49.8)	11.9 (53.4)	15.1 (59.2)	16.2 (61.2)	17.8 (64.0)	17.8 (64.0)	16.1 (61.0)	13.4 (56.1)	11.1 (52.0)	10.2 (50.4)	18.8 (65.8)
Mean daily maximum °C (°F)	6.1 (43.0)	5.8 (42.4)	6.7 (44.1)	8.3 (46.9)	10.6 (51.1)	12.6 (54.7)	14.4 (57.9)	14.7 (58.5)	13.0 (55.4)	10.4 (50.7)	8.1 (46.6)	6.6 (43.9)	9.8 (49.6)
Daily mean °C (°F)	4.1 (39.4)	3.8 (38.8)	4.6 (40.3)	6.1 (43.0)	8.1 (46.6)	10.3 (50.5)	12.2 (54.0)	12.6 (54.7)	11.1 (52.0)	8.5 (47.3)	6.2 (43.2)	4.5 (40.1)	7.7 (45.9)
Mean daily minimum °C (°F)	2.2 (36.0)	1.8 (35.2)	2.4 (36.3)	3.8 (38.8)	5.6 (42.1)	8.1 (46.6)	10.1 (50.2)	10.5 (50.9)	9.1 (48.4)	6.6 (43.9)	4.3 (39.7)	2.5 (36.5)	5.3 (41.5)
Mean minimum °C (°F)	−2.3 (27.9)	−3.2 (26.2)	−2.6 (27.3)	−0.7 (30.7)	1.1 (34.0)	4.3 (39.7)	6.8 (44.2)	6.8 (44.2)	5.0 (41.0)	1.8 (35.2)	−0.5 (31.1)	−2.7 (27.1)	−4.3 (24.3)
Record low °C (°F)	−8.9 (16.0)	−7.4 (18.7)	−8.3 (17.1)	−5.7 (21.7)	−2.2 (28.0)	−0.6 (30.9)	3.5 (38.3)	2.8 (37.0)	−0.6 (30.9)	−3.3 (26.1)	−5.7 (21.7)	−8.2 (17.2)	−8.9 (16.0)
Average precipitation mm (inches)	150.4 (5.92)	122.7 (4.83)	109.2 (4.30)	67.8 (2.67)	56.9 (2.24)	59.8 (2.35)	67.7 (2.67)	88.6 (3.49)	105.8 (4.17)	130.6 (5.14)	143.2 (5.64)	149.7 (5.89)	1,252.3 (49.30)
Average precipitation days (≥ 1.0 mm)	22.0	19.2	19.3	14.7	11.7	11.5	12.1	13.1	16.1	20.3	21.5	22.6	204.1
Average snowy days	10	9	9	5	1	0	0	0	0	1	5	8	48
Average relative humidity (%)	87	86	86	87	88	89	90	91	90	89	87	87	89
Mean monthly sunshine hours	27.4	57.6	97.7	141.2	191.9	147.7	128.6	132.4	99.5	75.1	38.3	20.6	1,158
Source 1: Met Office NOAA (relative humidity and snow days 1961–1990) Infoclimat
Source 2: KNMI

Climate data for Lerwick
Month	Jan	Feb	Mar	Apr	May	Jun	Jul	Aug	Sep	Oct	Nov	Dec	Year
Average sea temperature °C	9.3	8.8	8.6	8.8	9.9	11.5	13.0	13.4	12.8	11.9	11.4	10.3	10.8
Mean daily daylight hours	7.0	10.0	12.0	14.0	17.0	19.0	17.0	15.0	13.0	10.0	8.0	6.0	12.4
Average Ultraviolet index	0	1	1	3	4	5	5	4	2	1	0	0	2.4
Source: Weather Atlas Source: www.weather2travel.com

== Demography ==
At the 2022 Scottish census, Lerwick had a population of 6,709, making it the most-populous settlement in the Shetland archipelago.

== Industry and economy ==
Lerwick is a busy fishing and ferry port. The harbour also services vessels supporting the offshore oil industry.

== Power supply ==
Main power supply is from Lerwick Power Station located in Gremista.

== Notable buildings ==
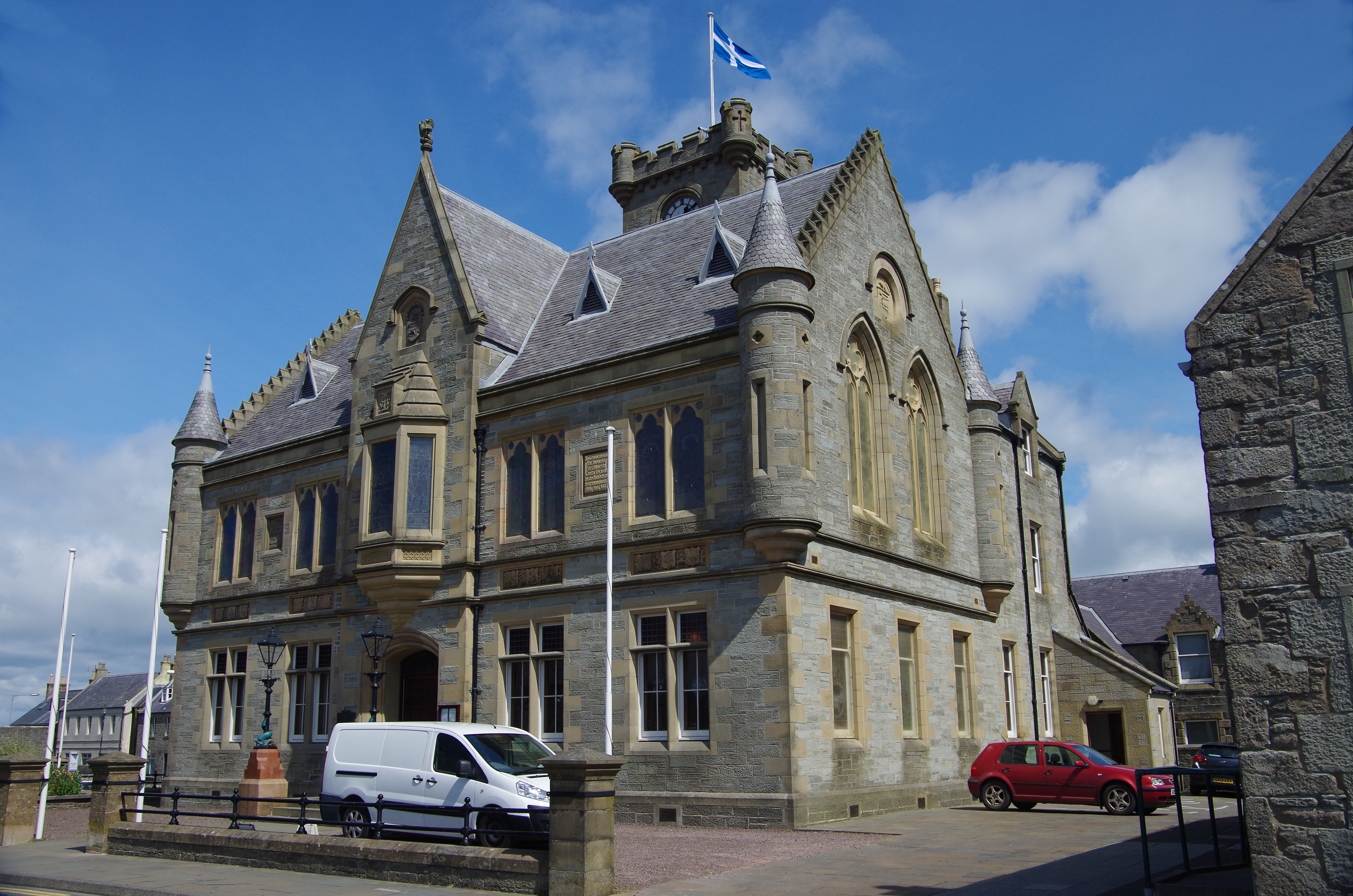
Lerwick Town Hall

Significant buildings in Lerwick include Fort Charlotte, Lerwick Town Hall, the Böd of Gremista, Shetland Museum and Broch of Clickimin.

Because of the historic nature of the area, some scenes from BBC's Shetland were filmed in Lerwick.

== Notable people ==
- Henry Aitken (1840–1899), mayor in New Zealand
- Arthur Anderson (1792–1868), businessman and Whig politician
- Aly Bain (born 1946), fiddler
- Ian Bairnson (1953–2023), musician
- Haldane Burgess (1862–1927), historian, poet, novelist, violinist, linguist and socialist
- Dorothea Primrose Campbell (1793–1863), poet, novelist and teacher
- Margaret Chalmers (1758–1827), poet
- Isaac Cowie (1848–1917), Scottish-born Canadian pioneer, fur trader, and politician
- Robert Cowie (1842–1874), physician and author
- Arthur Edmondston (1775–1841), physician and writer
- Alison Fairlie (1917–1993), professor
- Alexander Fraser (1747–1829), vice-admiral who served in the American War of Independence and French Revolutionary and Napoleonic Wars
- PB Fraser (1862–1940), Scottish-born New Zealand Presbyterian minister
- Ann Garriock (1857–1929), military nursing leader and Principal Matron in the Second Anglo Boer War.
- H. J. C. Grierson (1866–1960), literary scholar, editor, and literary critic
- John Henry (1834–1912), Scottish-born Australian politician
- Norman Lamont, former Member of Parliament and Chancellor of the Exchequer
- Peter MacDougall (1898–1955), Scottish World War I flying ace credited with seven aerial victories
- Ron Mathewson (1944–2020), jazz double bassist and bass guitarist
- Robert Stout (1844–1930), New Zealand politician who was the 13th premier of New Zealand on two occasions in the late 19th century, and later Chief Justice of New Zealand
- Jock Tait (1886 – 1945), cricketer
- Beatrice Wishart (born 1956), Member of the Scottish Parliament (2019–2026)

== Transportation ==
Lerwick is served by the Tingwall Airport located a few miles away and Sumburgh Airport that is further south and flies all year to some Scotland destinations.

NorthLink Ferries operate a daily overnight ferry service between Lerwick and Aberdeen, regularly calling in to Kirkwall in the Orkney Islands.

The Shetland Islands Council operate a ro-ro ferry service to Out Skerries and Bressay from a terminal in the centre of the town.

The local bus service is provided by the Regional Transport Partnership (ZetTrans) and operated by a number of different local bus service operators. The town has a bus station, Viking bus station.

== Schools and education ==
Lerwick's secondary school is Anderson High School.

Shetland College, a constituent partner institution of the University of the Highlands and Islands, is also based in the town, offering degree-level education (along with further education courses) to locals who may have difficulty travelling further afield to study.

== Hospitals and healthcare ==
The Gilbert Bain Hospital provides secondary care services to all of Shetland. The Montfield Hospital, a few hundred metres away, is an older hospital than the Gilbert Bain, but has become a secondary health care service for the people of Lerwick over time.

== Sport ==
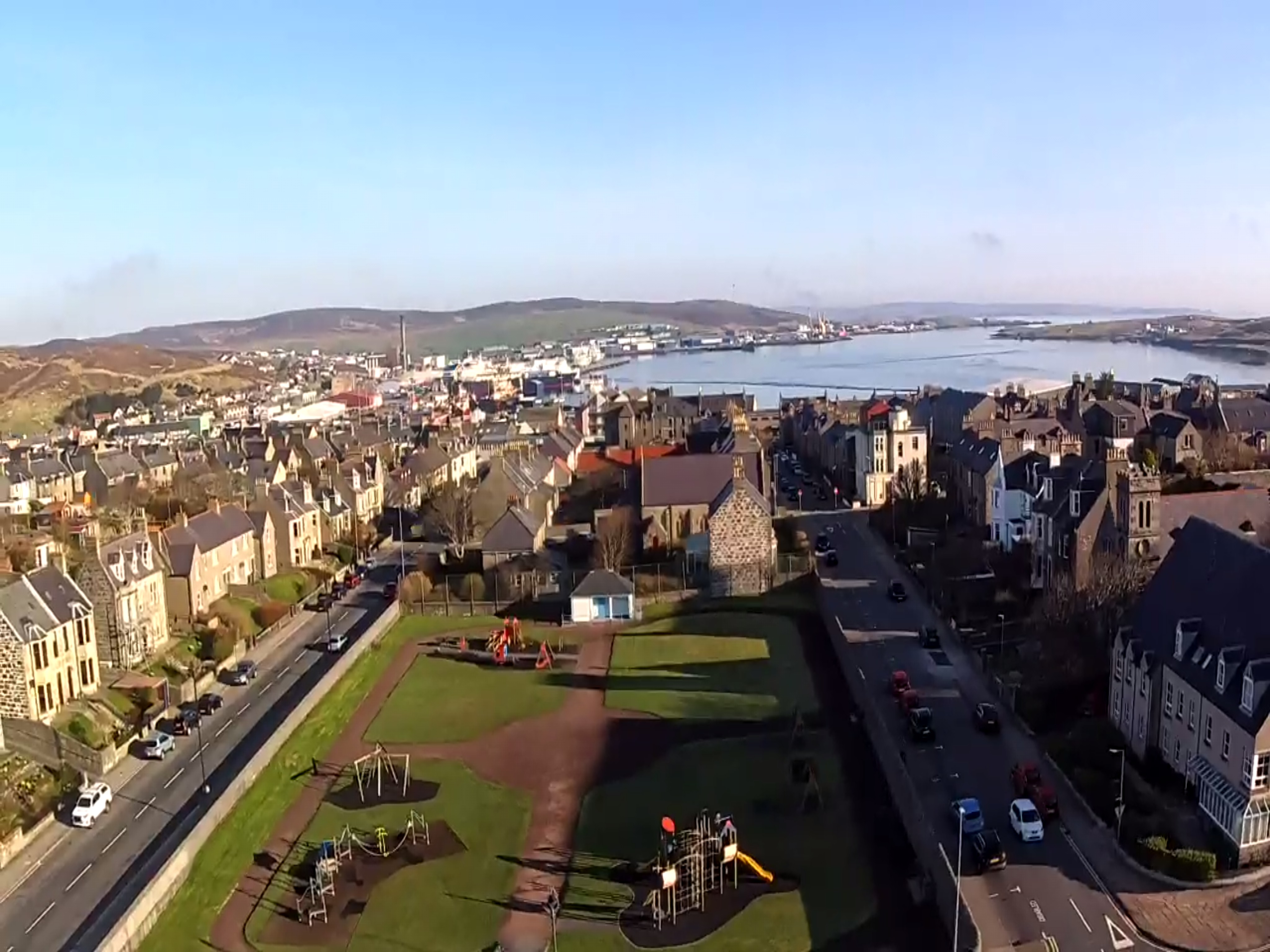
Central playground

The town is home to four football teams: Lerwick Spurs, Lerwick Thistle, Lerwick Celtic and Lerwick Rangers. The Clickimin Leisure Complex, opened on 30 March 1985 by Tessa Sanderson, provides sports facilities for the town such as a swimming pool and open court.

== Media ==
Television signals are received from the Bressay TV transmitter. Local independent radio station SIBC broadcasts daily from a studio in Market Street. BBC Radio Shetland, a BBC Radio Scotland regional opt out, has its studios in Pitt Lane. The Shetland Times, a weekly local newspaper, has its premises in Gremista on the northern outskirts of Lerwick. Millgaet Media Group, a multi-media production company, is based at the North Ness Business Park.

== Culture ==
Lerwick has strong ties with Scandinavian countries, particularly Norway (Lerwick has a friendship agreement with Måløy in Norway).

== Events ==
Lerwick is the focus of most events in Shetland, including the largest of the annual Up Helly Aa fire festivals which takes place on the last Tuesday of January every year.

== Places of worship ==
There are several churches in Lerwick, including:

- Adam Clarke Memorial Methodist Church (a congregation of the Methodist Church of Great Britain).
- Baptist Church, Clairmont Place.
- St. Columba's Church – one of three buildings of Lerwick and Bressay Parish Church (part of the Church of Scotland).
- St. Magnus' Church, Greenfield Place (part of the Scottish Episcopal Church).
- St. Margaret's Roman Catholic Church.

In the 19th century there were more churches in Lerwick, including a Free Church on South Hill Head.

While there is not currently a Muslim place of worship in Lerwick, there are plans to refurbish the old Lochside Stores building into a mosque.

== Gallery ==
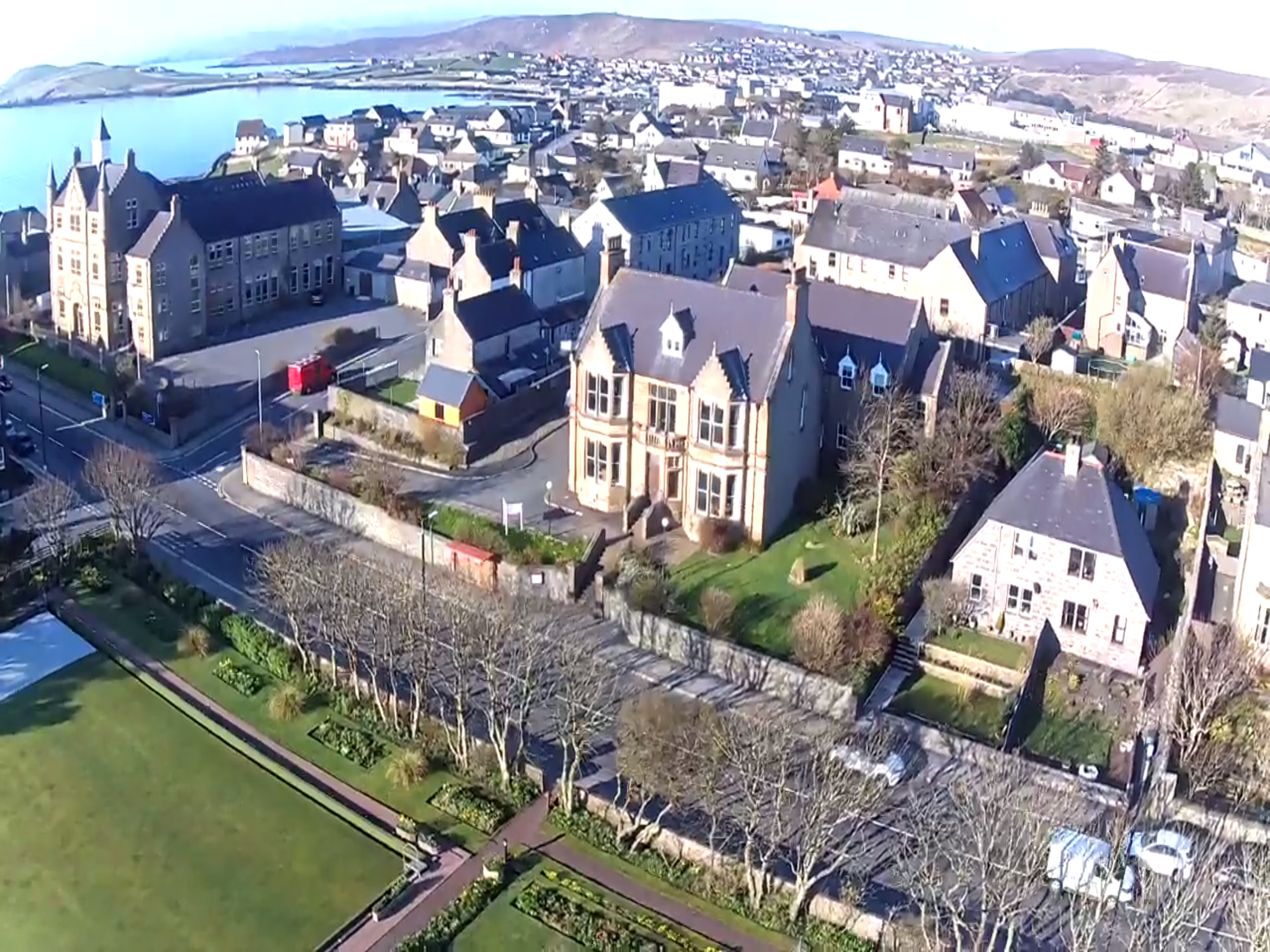
Jubilee Park, King Harald St and Southern Lerwick toward Lower Sound

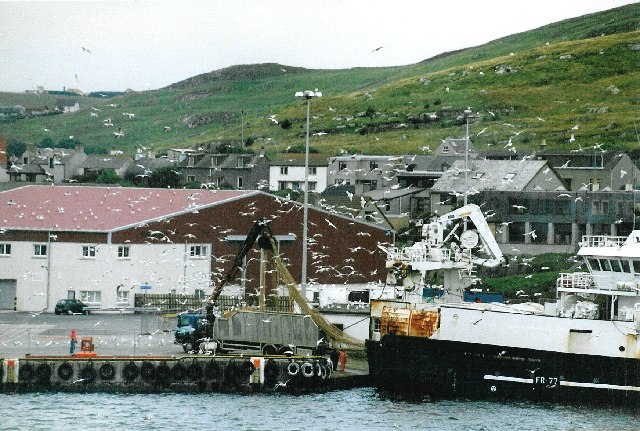
Lerwick Harbour

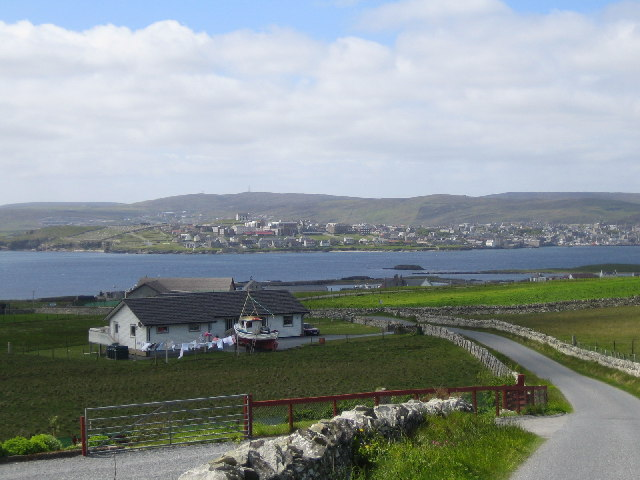
View of Lerwick from Bressay

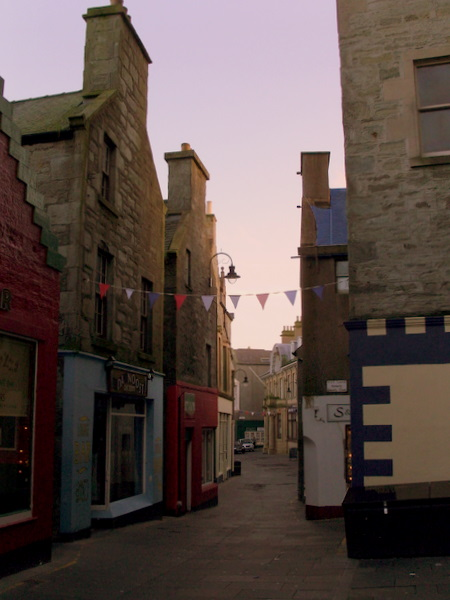
Commercial Street

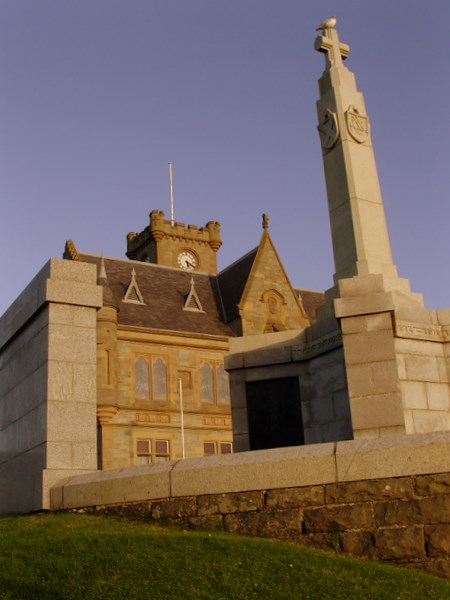
Lerwick Town Hall

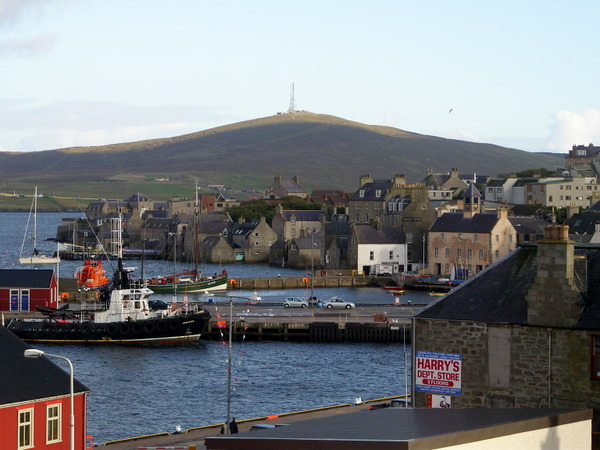
Lerwick from Fort Charlotte

== Notes and references ==
Notes
