= Margaret Chalmers =

Scottish poet

Margaret Chalmers (12 December 1758 – 12 March 1827) was a Scottish poet, self-styled "first British Thulian quill".

== Early life ==
Margaret Chalmers was baptised on 12 December 1758 in Lerwick. Her father, William, is said to have been the son of a Lord Provost of Aberdeen, factor to Earl of Morton and tacksman of various local estates. Her mother Catherine (Kitty) Irvine was born in Trondra in 1734. Chalmers had four sisters and a brother, William, who joined the navy and was killed, aged 35, in the battle of Trafalgar. The death of her father is not recorded, but by time of Trafalgar, her mother and one of the sisters were bedridden and the family was living in penury. Petitions were raised in the hope of securing a government pension, but these failed.

== Career ==
Like her younger fellow Lerwegian poet, Dorothea Primrose Campbell, whose life was similarly marred by poverty, Chalmers arranged to publish her poetry by subscription and her solitary book was published in Newcastle in 1813, after long delays during which many subscribers lost interest. She had sent copies of her poems to Sir Walter Scott during his visit to Shetland in 1814. However, there is nothing suggesting she ever received a reply; it is worth mentioning that she spoke to him as an equal in the letters held at the National Library of Scotland. After the publishing of her lone work, it did not garner the profit she had hoped for. However, copies were sold in areas from Shetland all the way to North Carolina. In 1816, she applied instead to the Royal Literary Fund, which awarded her the sum of ten pounds.

== Death and legacy ==
She died in Lerwick on 12 March 1827. "Miss Chalmers Stairs" in Lerwick, named in her honor, no longer exist.

== Style and themes ==
In her lone work, her poems play with the ideas of imagery in regard to reflections. She also speaks on the life of a woman living in Shetland during the late 1700s to early 1800s. Her own perspectives on the socio-economic status of Shetland is reflected in many of her pieces.

== Selected works ==
- Poems, Newcastle: S. Hodgson, 1813
