= BBC Radio Shetland =

Radio station in Lerwick, Scotland

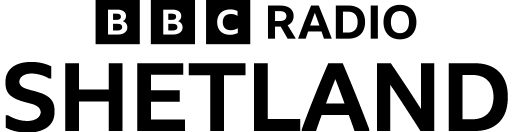
- Lerwick; Scotland
- Broadcast area: Shetland
- Frequency: FM: 92.7 MHz Bressay
- RDS: BBC_Scot

Programming
- Language: English
- Format: News, music, sport, talk
- Network: BBC Radio Scotland

Ownership
- Owner: BBC
- Operator: BBC Scotland
- Sister stations: BBC Radio Orkney

History
- First air date: 9 May 1977; 49 years ago

Technical information
- Licensing authority: Ofcom
- ERP: 50 kW

Links
- Webcast: BBC Sounds
- Website: BBC Radio Shetland listings

BBC Radio Shetland is a radio station and local opt-out service of BBC Radio Scotland, covering the Shetland Islands, Scotland. The station's studio is located in Pitt Lane, Lerwick.

== Regular Programming ==
For much of its broadcast day, BBC Radio Shetland broadcasts the output of BBC Radio Scotland. It opts out of this network for three regular slots.

=== Good Evening Shetland ===
A 30-minute local news and magazine programme which includes current affairs, weather, fishing reports, community diaries, public debate is broadcast Monday to Friday from 5:30pm.

=== Lunchtime Bulletin ===
A six minute long programme featuring the latest local headlines, broadcast Monday to Friday from 12:30pm.

=== Give Us A Tune ===
An hour-long music requests and dedications programme, broadcast on Friday evenings from 6pm. The programme features a different presenter each week. Listeners are encouraged during the show to submit requests by telephone, email, or through the BBC Radio Shetland Facebook page.

== Occasional Programming ==
=== Late Programmes ===
During the winter season, additional local programming is provided Monday to Thursday from 6pm. This generally contains slots covering local nature, food, football, film, health, history, politics, music and more.

=== Children in Need ===
As part of the Children In Need appeal, the station runs a five hour fundraiser featuring live performances from local musicians and guest interviews, as well as three auctions. The 2025 appeal raised £22,000. The station's fundraisers have raised over £1,000,000 since they began in the 1980s.

== Current Staff ==
- Editor: Cameron Angus-Mackay
- Senior Journalist: Iona Nicol
- Journalists: Jessie Clubb, Ross Cowper-Fraser, Andrea Raceková

== See also ==
- SIBC
- BBC Radio Orkney
