= Montfield Hospital =

- NHS Shetland
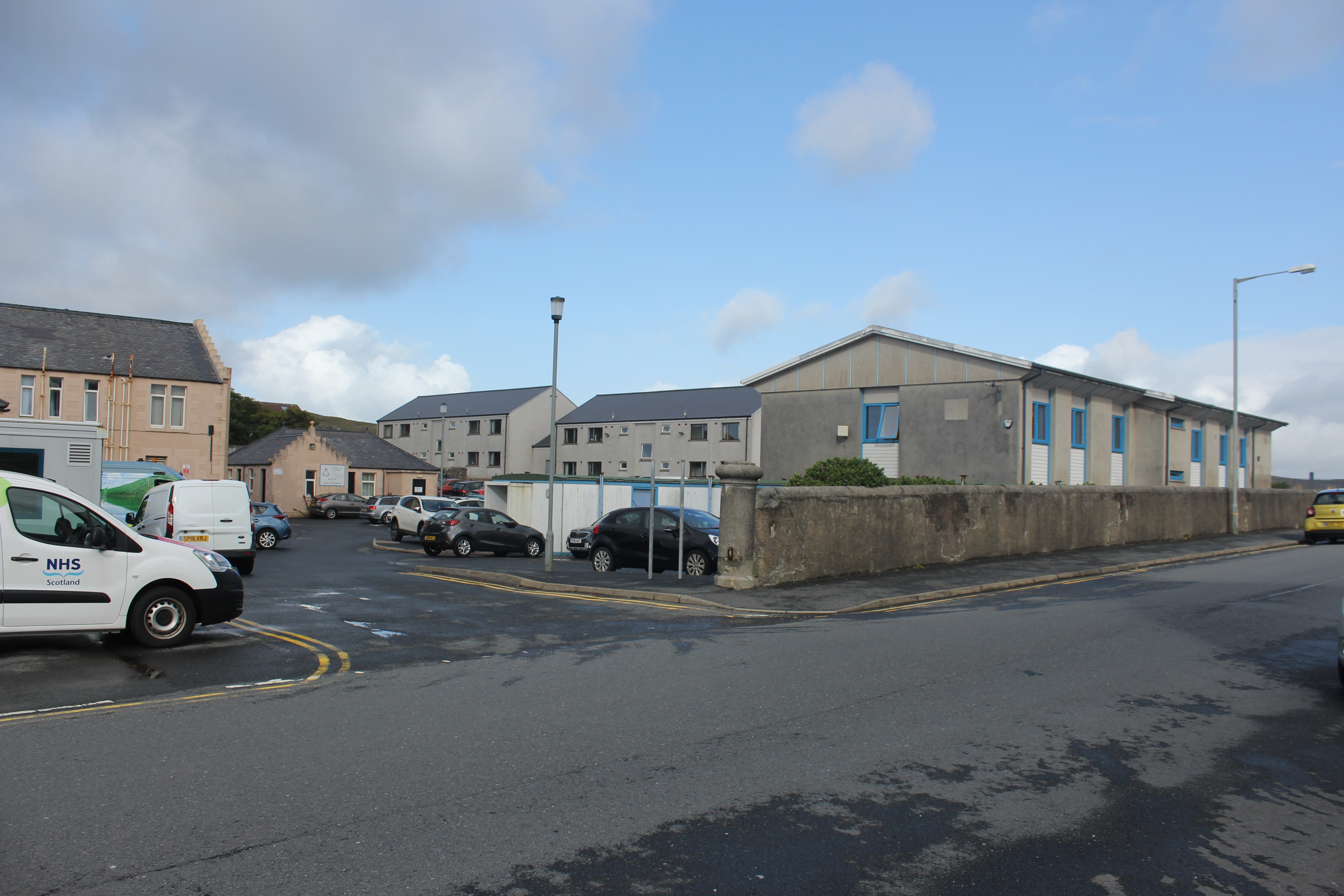
- Montfield Hospital

- Shown in Shetland

Geography
- Location: Burgh Road, Lerwick, Shetland, Scotland
- Coordinates: 60.1536°N 1.1517°W

Organisation
- Care system: NHS Scotland
- Type: Geriatric

History
- Founded: 1928

Links
- Lists: Hospitals in Scotland

The Montfield Hospital is a health facility in the burgh of Lerwick, Shetland, Scotland. It is managed by NHS Shetland.

== History ==
The facility, which was designed by P. Thompson, was opened as the Zetland County Sanatorium in November 1928. After joining the National Health Service in 1948, it was renamed Montfield Hospital in 1962 and was converted into a geriatric facility in 1983. A small care home was established on the ground floor in 2010. Following a public consultation in June 2011, NHS Shetland formally closed Montfield hospital in November 2011. The headquarters of the NHS Shetland Board, which had previously been based at Brevik House in Lerwick, was established on the upper floor in 2013.
