= Fort Charlotte, Shetland =

Category A listed building

Coordinates: 60°09′19″N 1°08′40″W

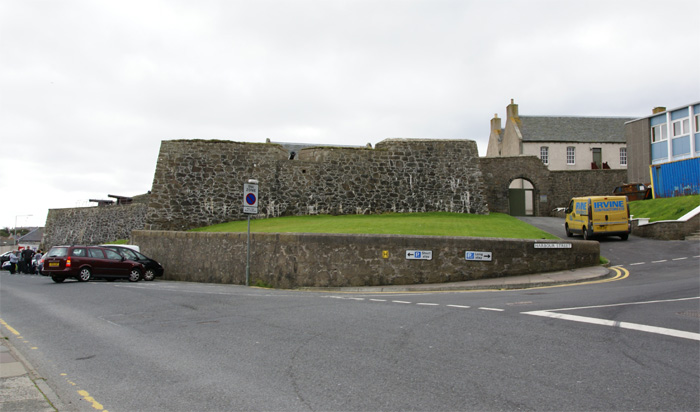
Fort Charlotte, Lerwick, Shetland, Scotland – from the north

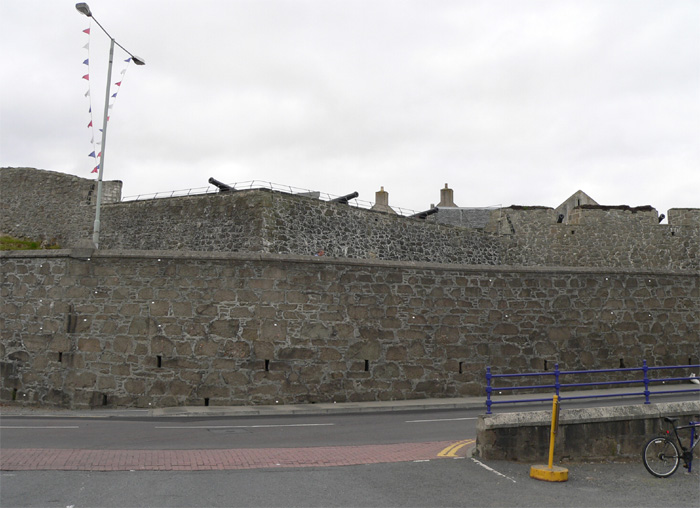
Fort Charlotte, Lerwick, Shetland, Scotland – from Commercial Street

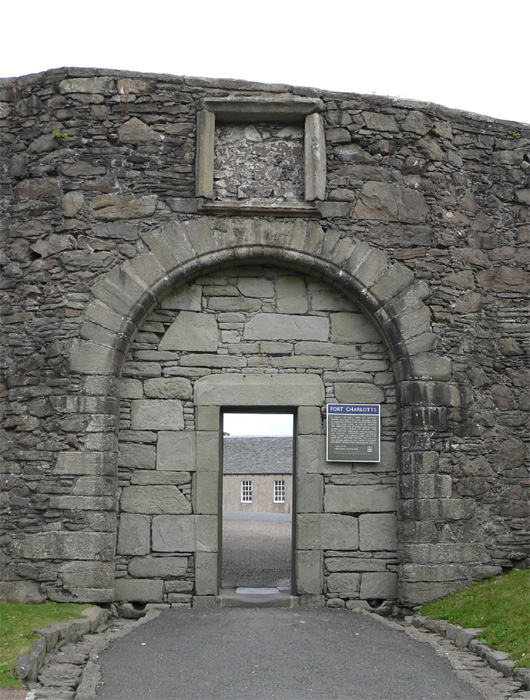
Fort Charlotte, Lerwick, Shetland, Scotland – south gate

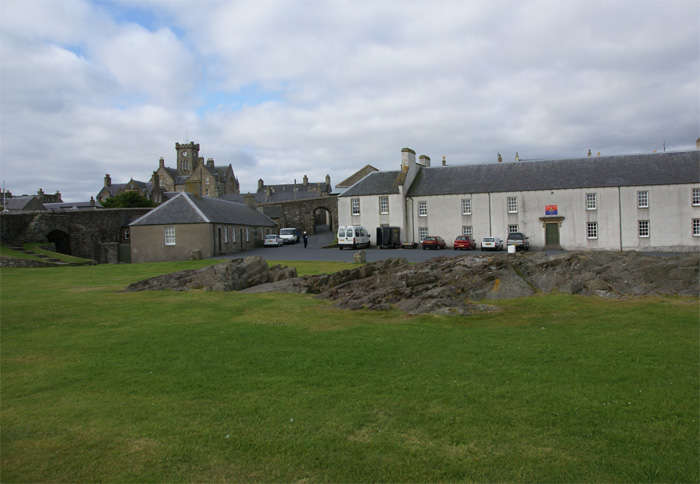
Fort Charlotte, Lerwick, Shetland, Scotland – barracks and west gate

Fort Charlotte in the centre of Lerwick, Shetland, is an artillery fort, roughly five sided, with bastions on each of three landward corners, and half-bastions on the corners of the seaward face.

== History ==
The first incarnation of the fort was built between 1652 and 1653 during the First Anglo-Dutch War. Little is known of the original structure and no trace of it has been found.

The second structure was built on the same site by Robert Mylne under the orders of Charles II at the start of the Second Anglo-Dutch War in 1665 at a cost of £28,000. It held off a Dutch fleet in 1667 which thought it was far more heavily manned and gunned than it actually was. In fact, the walls were unfinished and there were few guns. At the end of the war it was slighted when the government decided not to station a garrison in Lerwick, and it was unmanned when the Dutch burnt it in 1673 during the Third Anglo-Dutch War.

It was rebuilt in its current form in 1781 and named after Queen Charlotte, but has never seen service during hostilities since then. It housed a garrison during the Napoleonic Wars and was later a base for the Royal Naval Reserve. From 1837 to 1875 it was used as the town jail and courthouse and later a custom house and a coastguard station.

Land reclamation and structures erected in front of the fort mean that it no longer dominates the shoreline and the overall ground plan can only be seen from the air.

== Modern use ==
Fort Charlotte is managed by Historic Environment Scotland, and is the base for 212 Highland Battery, part of Britain's Army Reserve.
