= Bressay transmitting station =

Transmitter station in the Shetland Islands, Scotland

Bressay
- Location within Shetland
- Tower height: 70 metres (230 ft)
- Coordinates: 60.13°N 1.095833°W
- Grid reference: HU5022838667
- Built: 1964
- BBC region: BBC Scotland
- ITV region: STV North

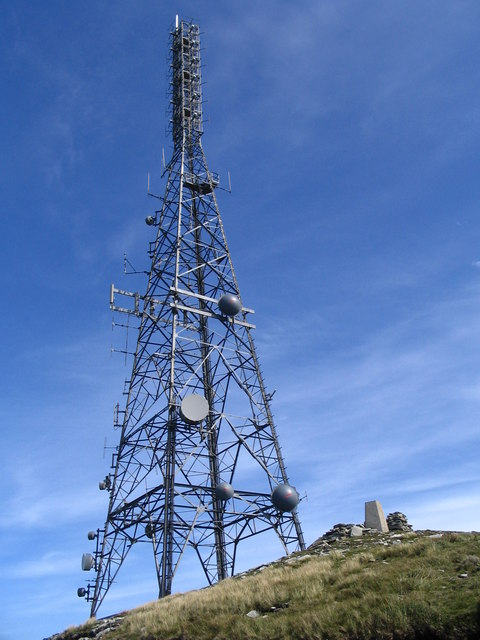
Ward of Bressay mast on Bressay, Shetland, Scotland

Bressay transmitting station is a broadcasting transmission facility for the Shetland Islands, located on the isle of Bressay, owned and operated by Arqiva (previously National Grid Wireless). The transmitting station is based on the Ward of Bressay, the island's highest peak.

The facility includes two steel lattice towers both over 70m high. It first came into service on 1 April 1964 transmitting BBC Television on Band I VHF channel 3 and the Scottish Home Service, Light Programme and Third on Band II VHF, using the same frequencies as today. (Home Service now Radio Shetland, Light R2 and Third R3).

== Services listed by frequency ==
=== Analogue radio ===
Frequency	kW	Service
88.3 MHz	43	BBC Radio 2
90.5 MHz	43	BBC Radio 3
92.7 MHz	43	BBC Radio Shetland
94.9 MHz	43	BBC Radio 4
96.2 MHz	15†	SIBC
97.9 MHz	43	BBC Radio 1

† Licensed to transmit at 50 kW.

=== Digital television ===
Frequency	UHF	kW	Operator	System
474.166 MHz	21+	2	Arqiva B	DVB-T
482.166 MHz	22+	2	BBC B	DVB-T2
498.000 MHz	24	2	Arqiva A	DVB-T
506.000 MHz	25	2	Digital 3&4	DVB-T
522.000 MHz	27	2	SDN	DVB-T
530.000 MHz	28	2	BBC A	DVB-T

==== Before switchover ====
Frequency	UHF	kW	Operator
474.000 MHz	21	1	BBC (Mux 1)
497.833 MHz	24-	1	Digital 3&4 (Mux 2)
521.833 MHz	27-	1	SDN (Mux A)
553.833 MHz	31-	1	BBC (Mux B)
834.000 MHz	66	1	Arqiva (Mux C)
842.000 MHz	67	1	Arqiva (Mux D)

=== Analogue television ===
Analog tv is now ceased. BBC2 was switch off on UHF 28 on the 5th of MAY 2010, followed by the 3 services on the 19th of May 2010. Channel 5 was never radiated from Bressay (It maybe because of Bressay being Rural)

Frequency	UHF	kW	Service
479.25 MHz	22	10	BBC One Scotland
503.25 MHz	25	10	STV (North) (Grampian)
527.25 MHz	28	10	BBC Two Scotland
559.25 MHz	32	10	Channel 4

== Digital switchover ==
The digital switchover happened in two stages.

In Stage One, BBC Two Scotland was switched off and anyone with Freeview, BT Vision or Top Up TV need to retune. BBCA was launched on 28 (expect for Voe & Weisdale where BBC1 Moved to the old BBC2 analogue number)

In Stage Two, analogue was permanently switched off and anyone with Freeview, BT Vision or Top Up TV needed to re-tune again. The date for this stage was 19 May 2010.

HD and high-powered Freeview services replaced the analogue signals.

== See also ==
- List of masts
- List of tallest buildings and structures in Great Britain
- List of radio stations in the United Kingdom
