= Henry Aitken (mayor) =

New Zealand mayor

Henry Aitken (1840–6 January 1899) was a mayor of Oamaru, in New Zealand.

Aitken was born in 1840 in Lerwick in Scotland's Shetland Islands, where he trained in the building trade. He emigrated to New Zealand in 1861, drawn by the Otago gold rush, initially settling in Dunedin but soon moving north to Oamaru.

Aitken's early years in Oamaru were spent working as a storeman with Dalgety Rattray & Co., leaving in 1868 to found his own timber merchant's business. This was a success, and was run by Aitken until 1883. Aitken was during this time also an agent for the Union Steam Ship Company, and after 1883 he dedicated his business time primarily to that role.

Aitken was heavily involved in local politics, serving as a borough councillor for some time, including four terms as Mayor from 1895 until his death. He also served at various times as Chairman of the Oamaru Harbour Board, president of the local Caledonian Society and president of the Acclimatisation Society.

Aitken died on 6 January 1899 during his fourth term as mayor, and was buried in Oamaru cemetery.

Shortly after arriving in New Zealand, Aitken married fellow Shetland Islander Betsy Williamson. They had several children but most died young; only one son outlived his father.
