= SIBC =

Coordinates: 60.155559°N 1.146110°W

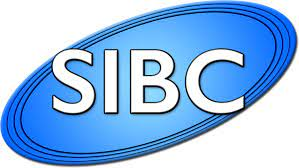
- Lerwick; Scotland
- Broadcast area: Shetland Islands
- Frequencies: FM: 96.2 MHz (Shetland Islands); 102.2 MHz (Lerwick)
- RDS: SIBC____

Programming
- Format: Contemporary hit radio

Ownership
- Owner: Shetland Islands Broadcasting Company

History
- First air date: 26 November 1987

Links
- Website: SIBC

Shetland Islands Broadcasting Company (SIBC) is the only Independent Local Radio station broadcasting in the Shetland Islands. Its coverage extends across the whole of Shetland. The station, which is owned and operated by husband and wife team, Ian Anderson and Inga Walterson, is located at Market Street, Lerwick and broadcasts from Bressay on 96.2 MHz FM.

== History ==
The company, which was registered on 23 September 1985, began broadcasting on 26 November 1987, initially as an unlicensed pirate radio station covering the immediate area around Lerwick, after the operator was told by regulators of the era that the population of Shetland was too small to support an independent local radio station.

SIBC was later granted an official licence in 1991, extending its coverage to the whole of the Shetland Islands. It is currently on a 12-year commercial radio licence from broadcasting regulator Ofcom.

Ian Anderson, one of the station's two owners, was previously a broadcaster for the BBC and Radio Forth, as well as pirate radio stations including Radio Atlantis, Radio Northsea International, and Radio Caroline.

== Programming ==
SIBC is on the air 24 hours a day, seven days a week, with a schedule of contemporary hit music and local news (on the hour and at 07:30, 08:30 and 17:30), which at times includes news of Shetland fish landings. The station also carries, as necessary, essential information regarding emergencies, school closures, etc. Programming is largely automated outside of the breakfast slot. Music by local Shetland artists forms a part of SIBC's playlist.

The station is unusual in that it carries very few DJ-led programmes, most hours are filled with back-to-back music, and all programmes and news bulletins aired on the station are presented by either Ian Anderson or Inga Walterson. Its format has remained unchanged since launch, with only the music being updated to reflect current hits.

== Transmission ==
SIBC transmits its main signal on 96.2 MHz from a transmitter on the island of Bressay with an effective radiated power of 14kW. The station has an additional transmitter facility situated at its Lerwick premises, broadcasting with 25 watts on 102.2 MHz, as an emergency back-up facility to provide coverage to Lerwick in the event of issues at Bressay.

== See also ==
- BBC Radio Shetland
