= List of listed buildings in Castle Douglas, Dumfries and Galloway =

This is a list of listed buildings in the Civil Parish of Castle Douglas in the historical county of Kirkcudbrightshire in Dumfries and Galloway, Scotland.

== List ==
Name	Location	Date Listed	Grid Ref. (Note: Sometimes known as OSGB36, the grid reference (where provided) is based on the British national grid reference system used by the Ordnance Survey. • "Guide to National Grid". Ordnance Survey. • "Get-a-map". Ordnance Survey.)	Geo-coordinates	Notes	LB Number (Note: Historic Environment Scotland assign a unique alphanumeric identifier to each designated site in Scotland, for listed buildings this always begins with "LB", for example "LB12345".)	Image
114-118 (Even Nos) Queen Street				54°56′21″N 3°55′48″W	Category C(S)	22977	Upload Photo
11-15 (Odd Nos) St Andrews Street And King Street, The Douglas Arms Hotel				54°56′21″N 3°55′55″W	Category C(S)	22980	Upload Photo
Kelton Manse Of Kelton Stables				54°55′23″N 3°56′13″W	Category C(S)	22972	Upload Photo
Lochbank With Gatepiers And Boundary Walls				54°55′47″N 3°56′14″W	Category B	50124	Upload Photo
210 And 212 King Street And 32 St Andrew Street				54°56′20″N 3°55′56″W	Category C(S)	50164	Upload Photo
Furbar				54°55′41″N 3°56′26″W	Category B	22971	Upload Photo
122-126 (Even Nos) Queen Street				54°56′20″N 3°55′48″W	Category C(S)	22978	Upload Photo
66 St Andrew Street				54°56′15″N 3°55′45″W	Category B	49413	Upload Photo
193 & 195 King Street, The Merrick Hotel				54°56′21″N 3°55′54″W	Category C(S)	50048	Upload Photo
Threave Lodge And Gates				54°55′37″N 3°56′25″W	Category C(S)	22984	Upload Photo
Littlebank (Former Lodge To Lochbank), With Boundary Walls				54°55′46″N 3°56′15″W	Category C(S)	50125	Upload Photo
Abercromby Road, St John The Evangelist, Rc Church, Presbytery And Retaining Walls				54°56′24″N 3°56′00″W	Category C(S)	22970	Upload Photo
Kirkland House And Gatepiers				54°55′36″N 3°56′21″W	Category B	22975	Upload Photo
Abercromby Road, Kilmichael - Outbuilding Formerly Old House Of Fuffnock				54°56′41″N 3°56′27″W	Category C(S)	22969	Upload Photo
131-133 (Odd Nos) King Street, Royal Bank Scotland				54°56′25″N 3°55′49″W	Category B	22973	Upload Photo
New Market Street Castle Douglas Cattle Mart				54°56′33″N 3°55′28″W	Category A	22976	Upload another image See more images
St Andrew Street, Town Hall And Customs House				54°56′23″N 3°55′57″W	Category B	22979	Upload another image
Marle Street And Lochside Road, Lochside Theatre Former St Andrews Parish Church (Church Of Scotland) With Retaining Walls, Railings, Piers And Lamp Standards				54°56′13″N 3°55′51″W	Category C(S)	22981	Upload Photo
St Andrew Street, The Brae				54°56′18″N 3°55′43″W	Category B	22982	Upload Photo
St Andrew Street, The Grove				54°56′15″N 3°55′38″W	Category C(S)	22983	Upload Photo
King Street, Castle Douglas Library With Art Gallery, Boundary Wall, Railings, Gates And Gatepiers				54°56′32″N 3°55′38″W	Category B	49671	Upload another image
35 King Street, Imperial Hotel				54°56′32″N 3°55′41″W	Category B	22974	Upload another image
Whitepark Road, St Ninians Episcopal Church				54°56′13″N 3°55′41″W	Category B	22985	Upload Photo

== Key ==
The scheme for classifying buildings in Scotland is:

- Category A: "buildings of national or international importance, either architectural or historic; or fine, little-altered examples of some particular period, style or building type."
- Category B: "buildings of regional or more than local importance; or major examples of some particular period, style or building type, which may have been altered."
- Category C: "buildings of local importance; lesser examples of any period, style, or building type, as originally constructed or moderately altered; and simple traditional buildings which group well with other listed buildings."

In March 2016 there were 47,288 listed buildings in Scotland. Of these, 8% were Category A, and 50% were Category B, with the remaining 42% being Category C.
