= Castle Douglas Town Hall =

Judicial building in Castle Douglas, Scotland

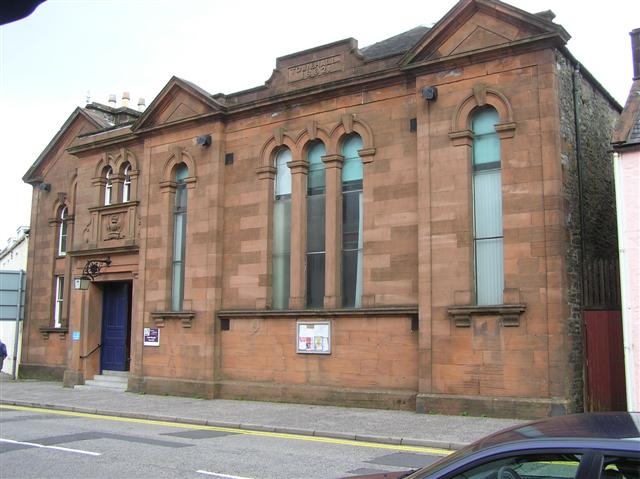
- The building in October 2009

- Shown within Dumfries and Galloway
- 54.9395°N 3.9326°W
- Location: St Andrew Street, Castle Douglas

History
- Built: 1863

Site notes
- Architect: James Barbour
- Architectural style: Italianate style

Listed Building – Category B
- Official name: St Andrew Street, Town Hall and Customs House
- Designated: 23 April 1990
- Reference no.: LB22979

Castle Douglas Town Hall is a municipal building in St Andrew Street in Castle Douglas in Dumfries and Galloway, Scotland. The building, which is now used a community events venue, is a Category B listed building.

== History ==
Following significant population growth, largely associated with its status as a market town, the area became a police burgh in 1846. In this context, burgh leaders decided to commission a town hall. The site they selected was on the northeast side of St Andrew Street. Construction of the new building started in 1862. It was designed by James Barbour in the Italianate style, built in red ashlar stone at a cost of £1,300 and was completed in 1863.

The design involved an asymmetrical main frontage of five bays facing St Andrew Street. The first bay on the left, which was recessed, was fenestrated by three sash windows on the ground floor and three lancet windows on the first floor with a gable above. The second bay featured a doorway flanked by Doric order pilasters supporting an entablature; there were two small lancet windows on the first floor. The third and fifth bays, which were slightly projected forward and pedimented, were fenestrated by full height lancet windows, while the fourth bay was fenestrated by a three full-height lancet windows separated by colonnettes. The lancet windows all had moulded surrounds and keystones. Internally, the principal room was the main assembly hall, which was equipped with a stage.

The building continued to serve as the meeting place of the burgh council for much of the 20th century but ceased to be the local seat of government when the enlarged Stewartry District Council was formed in 1975. The town hall was subsequently used as community events venue hosting functions such as dances and concerts. Works of art in the town hall include a portrait by William Stewart MacGeorge of a local solicitor, Richard Hewat. There are also several paintings by Malcolm Maclachlan Harper depicting local scenes.

== See also ==
- List of listed buildings in Castle Douglas, Dumfries and Galloway
