= Threave =

Threave may refer to:

- Threave Castle, a castle in Scotland
- Threave Gardens, a garden in Scotland
- Threave Rovers F.C., a football team from Castle Douglas, Scotland
