= Agnes Macdonald =

Agnes Macdonald may refer to:

- Agnes Macdonald, 1st Baroness Macdonald of Earnscliffe, second wife of Sir John A. Macdonald
- Agnes Syme Macdonald, Scottish suffragette
- Agnes Gertrude VanKoughnet, Canadian socialite and second wife of Hugh John Macdonald
- Agnes MacDonald, one of the MacDonald sisters, Scottish women notable for their marriages to well-known men

== See also ==
- Agnes McDonald, New Zealand nurse, postmistress and teacher
