= Thornhill Hospital =

- NHS Dumfries and Galloway
- Shown in Dumfries and Galloway

Geography
- Location: Townhead Street, Thornhill, Dumfries and Galloway, Scotland
- Coordinates: 55.2358°N 3.7670°W

Organisation
- Care system: NHS Scotland
- Type: General

History
- Founded: 1901

Links
- Lists: Hospitals in Scotland

Thornhill Hospital is a health facility in Townhead Street, Thornhill, Dumfries and Galloway, Scotland. It is managed by NHS Dumfries and Galloway.

== History ==
The facility, which was designed by Evan Tweedie, was established as an infectious diseases hospital in 1901. Accommodation was provided for nurses. The hospital joined the National Health Service in 1948.
