= Castle Douglas =

Town in Dumfries and Galloway, Scotland

Castle Douglas: Scottish Gaelic: Caisteal Dhùghlais
- Town
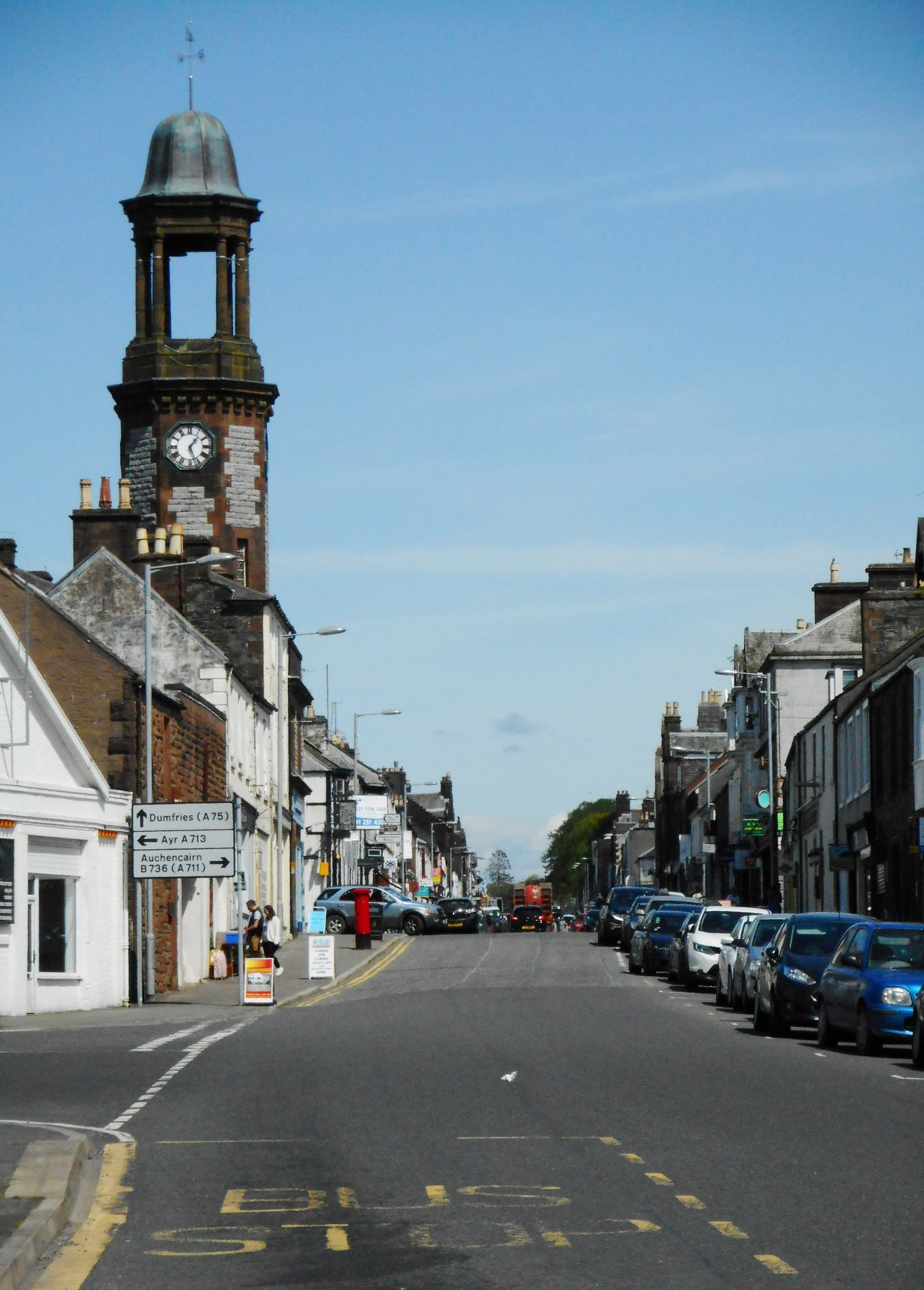
- Castle Douglas, King Street with Town Clock tower at centre

- Location within Dumfries and Galloway
- Population: 4,056 (2022)
- OS grid reference: NX765625
  - Edinburgh: 76 mi (122 km)
  - London: 285 mi (459 km)
- Council area: Dumfries and Galloway
- Lieutenancy area: Kirkcudbrightshire
- Country: Scotland
- Sovereign state: United Kingdom
- Post town: CASTLE DOUGLAS
- Postcode district: DG7
- Dialling code: 01556
- Police: Scotland
- Fire: Scottish
- Ambulance: Scottish
- UK Parliament: Dumfries and Galloway
- Scottish Parliament: Galloway and West Dumfries

Castle Douglas (Scottish Gaelic: Caisteal Dhùghlais) (Usually referred to as CD) is a market town in Dumfries and Galloway, Scotland. It lies in the lieutenancy area of Kirkcudbrightshire, in the eastern part of Galloway, between the towns of Dalbeattie and Gatehouse of Fleet.

The town is 76 miles (122 km) south-southwest of Edinburgh, 60 miles (97 km) south of Glasgow, and 16 miles (26 km) southwest of Dumfries. It had a population of 4,056 in 2022. It is in the ecclesiastical parish of Kelton.

== History ==
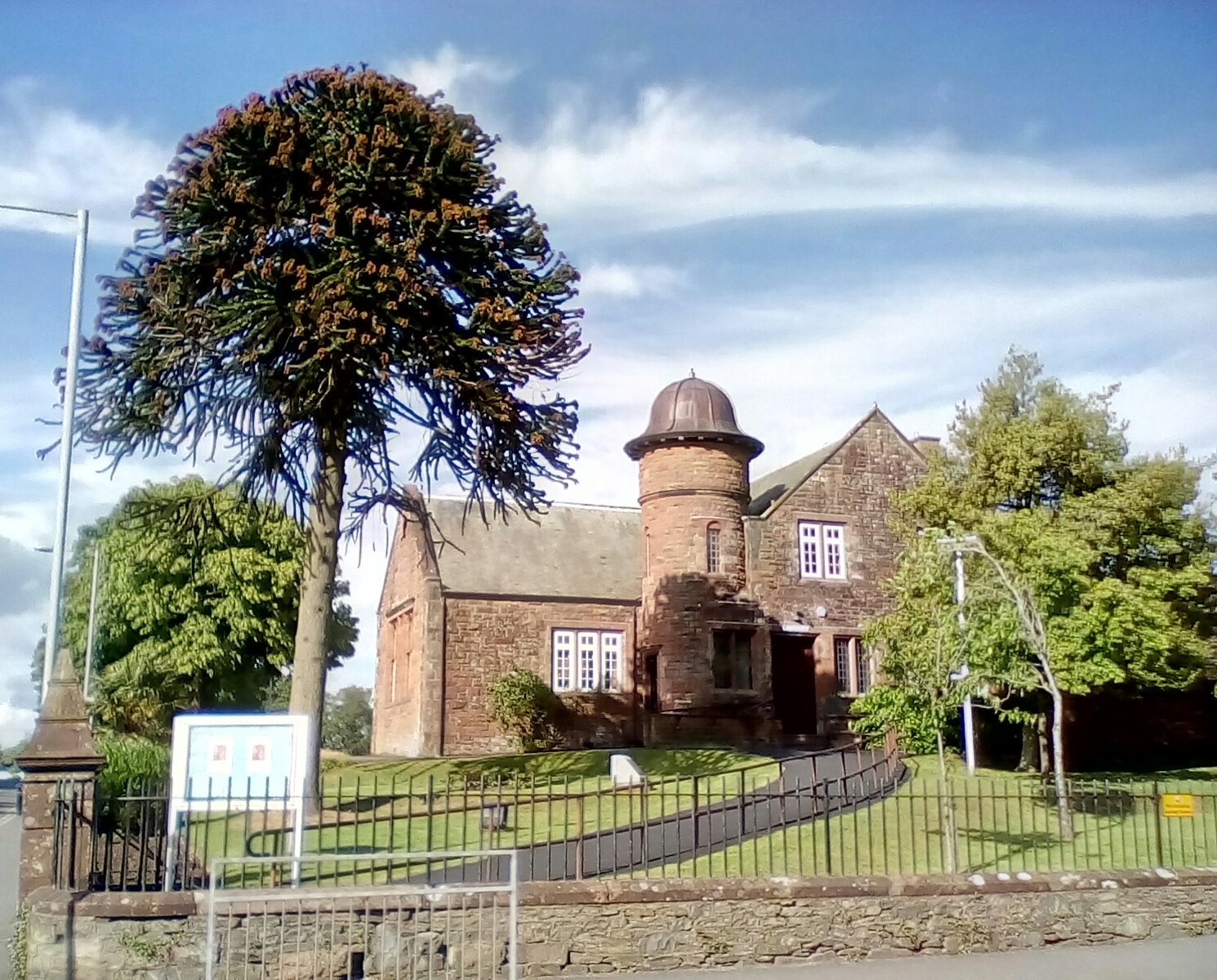
Castle Douglas, The Library, built 1904.

Castle Douglas is built next to Carlingwark Loch in which traces of prehistoric crannogs can be found, evidence of early inhabitation of the area. A large bronze cauldron containing about 100 metal objects was found in Carlingwark Loch near Fir Island about 1866. The hoard of tools of iron and bronze is probably Romano-Belgic of the late first or early second centuries AD and is likely to have been a votive offering. It is now in the National Museums of Scotland in Edinburgh. To the north of the town Glenlochar is the site of two successive Roman forts: the first was built during the invasion of Agricola, and the second during the Antonine period. They appear to have been for cavalry units, and evidence has been found that a "vicus" grew up around them. They were abandoned completely by around 160 AD.

Nearby Threave Castle (built in the 14th century) was a seat of the powerful "Black" Earls of Douglas. A small collection of cottages developed by the shores of Carlingwark, which was a source of marl. These cottages can still be seen on the Western approach to Castle Douglas and are known as The Buchan. The development of a military road through Galloway built by Major William Caulfeild passed through the Carlingwark area and improved transportation connections in the 18th century.

Traditionally Mary Queen of Scots is said to have lodged at the House of Fuffnock on the Crossmichael Road on her journey to Port Mary in 1568 after the Battle of Langside.

Castle Douglas was founded in 1792 by William Douglas, who claimed, but had no close connection with, the ancient Douglases of Threave Castle. He had made his money in an 'American Trade' and created a planned town on the shores of Carlingwark Loch. The town's layout is based upon the grid plan pattern of streets as used in Edinburgh's New Town, built around the same time. Sir William Douglas also created a number of industries in Castle Douglas, including hand-woven cotton factories from which Cotton Street derives its name.

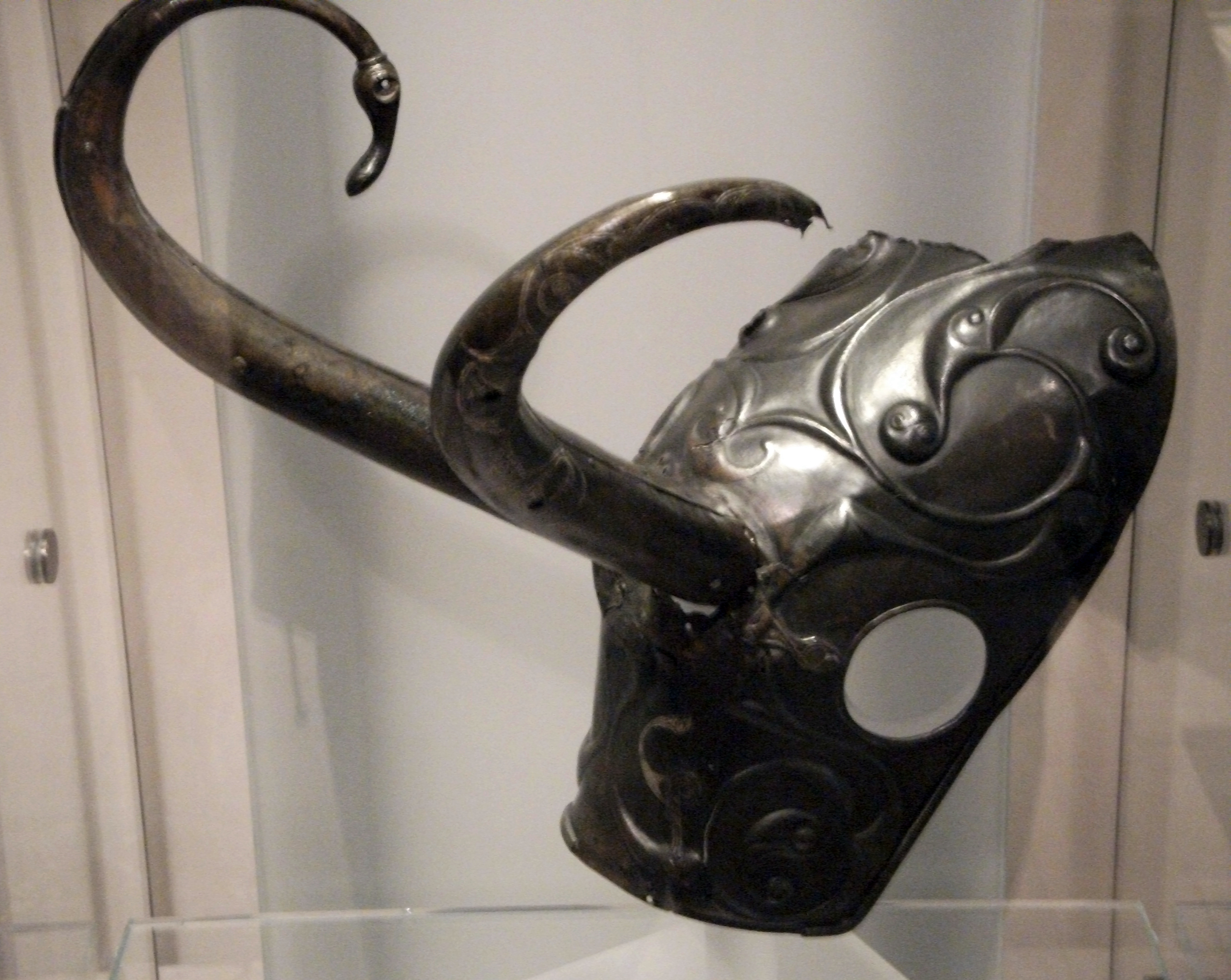
The Torrs Pony Cap

The Torrs Pony-cap and Horns is an Iron Age bronze horned cap for a pony found in Torrs Loch at Castle Douglas in 1812. It was acquired by Joseph Train, FSA Scot., the local antiquarian and author who presented it to Sir Walter Scott for his collection of antiquities at Abbotsford House. It is now in the National Museums of Scotland in Edinburgh.

The completion of the Castle Douglas and Dumfries Railway in 1859 further improved the town's connections, and it soon developed into a major market town for the surrounding area. This is still true today and the 1900 hexagonal market building is in constant use. Although the railway was closed in 1965, the A75 trunk road was developed roughly following the lines of the original military road and passes through Castle Douglas. The many hotels and pubs which derived from coach stops are an indication of the town's importance as a stopping place for travellers.

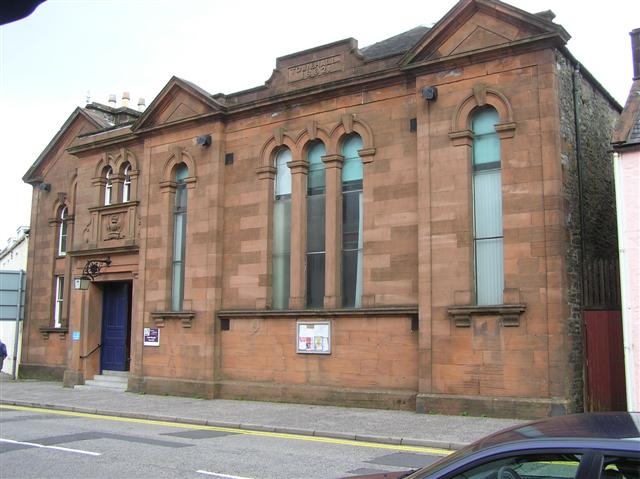
Castle Douglas Town Hall

Castle Douglas Town Hall was built in 1863 to the designs of Dumfries architect James Barbour. St John the Evangelist Catholic Church was built in 1867 by the London architect George Goldie. It is a Category B(S) listed building.

=== 20th century ===
The Clock Tower was built 1934–35 and stands at the corner of King St and St Andrews St. It is a Category C listed building. It was designed by the architect William Forrest Valentine (1885–1957). The first tower, built by Sir William Douglas, was destroyed by fire in 1892, as was a second clock tower forty years later. A plaque records that in 1935 Henry J. Hewat of Paterson, New Jersey, USA, donated the present clock tower to the town. Capt Hewat was a native of Castle Douglas who had emigrated to the US in 1893.

Freeman Wills Crofts set a key scene in his 1930 novel "Sir John Magill's Last Journey" at Castle Douglas railway station.

The former parish church (St Andrew's) was remodelled by Robert Lorimer in 1900. It was converted into a theatre, now known as The Fullarton.

The Castle Douglas War Memorial was designed by Captain Frank Mears and was unveiled in 1921.

Castle Douglas was a reception area for Glasgow's evacuated children during World War II.

From March 1943 to April 1944, the town was the base for 92nd (Loyals) Light Anti-Aircraft Regiment, Royal Artillery, which was training for Operation Overlord, the invasion of occupied Europe. Their headquarters were at Craigroyston, a large Victorian house near the railway station. Nissen huts were set up at Carlingwark Loch to house the troops, while other billets included a church and a bowling clubhouse.

== Sights and attractions ==
Castle Douglas Art Gallery is an offshoot of the Stewartry Museum at Kirkcudbright. It was bequeathed to the town by local artist Ethel Bristowe and opened in 1938. It is an exhibition space and used as such by local artists to display their work. It was designed by the Kirkcudbrightshire County Council architect William MacKinnell.

Near the centre of town is Carlingwark Loch, a loch and SSSI, home to numerous water birds.

Nearby stands Threave Castle, the family castle of the Black Douglas line of the House of Douglas. It lies on an island in the middle of the River Dee, admission includes the short ferry journey.

Also to the west of the town are Threave Gardens, a National Trust for Scotland property.

Threave Rovers are the local football team in Castle Douglas, they play at Meadow Park in the West of Scotland Football League and their strip colours are black and white stripes.

Castle Douglas hosts an annual Civic Week, which is one of several community events during the year. Its usual format is a week of events held during late July, culminating in Douglas Day when a street procession and carnival takes place. Douglas Day stopped for several years around the time of the Covid-19 pandemic, however it has since been resurrected, with local business owners and volunteers organising the week's activities.

== Amenities ==
The town is commonly used by tourists as a base for exploring the area. There is a camping and caravan park by Carlingwark Loch and many hotels.

The main shopping street in Castle Douglas is King Street. It has a wide range of shops, including many shops not often found on many town high streets. The town has two supermarkets and a convenience store. Also on King Street are Italian, Chinese and Indian restaurants, as well as pubs and hotels serving meals, and several take-aways. Castle Douglas is designated Scotland's Food Town and boasts some 50 outlets connected with the food industry.

Parking in the town is free. There is a large car park at Market Hill at the top of the town next to the Heart of Galloway Visitor Centre. There is also free parking on many of the side streets that lead away from the town centre.

As a regional market town, Castle Douglas accommodates Wallets Mart, a livestock market visited by Queen Elizabeth II in July 2010.

There are several churches in Castle Douglas, including a Church of Scotland, a Betheren, an Episcopalian St Ninian's, the New Life Church Castle Douglas, an Elim Pentecostal Church. The Catholic Parish of St John the Evangelist offers Mass in St Ninian Episcopalian Church.

Castle Douglas Hospital was built in 1897 to commemorate Queen Victoria's Diamond Jubilee. It was designed by Richard Park of Newton Stewart and opened on 13 October 1899.

The town has a vibrant Community Centre on Cotton Street with over 600 users and is home to The Fullarton, a theatre opened 1996 in the building of the former St Andrew's Church. It currently hosts plays and conferences as well as providing a local cinema.

2329 (Castle Douglas) Sqn (Note: Location of the 2329 Castle Douglas Squadron 54°56′16″N 3°55′59″W) Air Training Corps is located in the town and is active within the local community, as well as offering young people between the ages of 12 and 20 opportunities to fly, visit RAF stations across the UK and experience adventures.

There are a library, a swimming pool and a bus hub in Market Street.

Castle Douglas Library situated on the Market Hill, was designed by architect George Washington Browne and opened in 1904 with funding from Andrew Carnegie, the Scottish-American industrialist and philanthropist. As well as books and a local history section it offers a range of services including internet access.

The swimming pool has a fitness suite attached.

The bus hub provides services throughout Dumfries and Galloway.

== Robert Burns ==
Robert Burns spent the night here at the Carlinwark Inn while on his Galloway Tour. From here he wrote a letter to Mrs Dunlop in Ayrshire dated 25 June 1794 beginning" Here, in a solitary inn, in a solitary village... ". Here also he wrote his last letter to Agnes McLehose with the lines,
Ah ! My ever dearest Clarinda !
...Here am I set, a solitary hermit,
in the solitary room, of a solitary inn,
with a solitary bottle of wine by me.

== Notable people ==
- George Badenoch (1884-1915), footballer, killed in World War I.
- John Biggar (born 1964), mountaineer who has made various first ascents in the Andes.
- Nigel John Biggar, Lord Biggar, of Castle Douglas, (born 14 March 1955) is a British Anglican priest, theologian, and ethicist. From 2007 to 2022, he was the Regius Professor of Moral and Pastoral Theology at the University of Oxford. He was made Baron Biggar, of Castle Douglas in the Stewartry of Kirkcudbright, on 21 January 2025, and was introduced to the House of Lords on 28 January.
- Ethel Bristowe, (1864-1952) artist and assyriologist, bequeathed to Castle Douglas the art gallery at the library on the Market Hill.
- Dr David Clark, Baron Clark of Windermere, born 1939.
- Samuel Rutherford Crockett (1859-1914), author of The Raiders and many other works of historical fiction, lived at 24 Cotton Street, Castle Douglas and attended Cowper's School also in Cotton Street.
- Brown Derby, (1914-2000) was a Scottish film and television actor.
- Charles Dickens, visited the antiquarian and author Joseph Train, FSA Scot, (1779–1852) at his home Lochvale Cottage and wrote about it in his periodical Household Words, no.173 July 1853, which appeared after Train's death. A marble plaque commemorating Train and his life and friendship with Sir Walter Scott can be found in Castle Douglas Town Hall.
- Sir William Douglas, 1st Baronet, 1801, (1745–1809), Founder of the burgh of Castle Douglas. Buried in the Douglas Mausoleum on Kelton Hill overlooking the town.
- Major-General Sir Victor Fortune (1883–1949).
- Agnes McDonald (1829-1906) was an early European settler to New Zealand, working as a nurse, postmistress and teacher.
- William Stewart McGeorge (1862-1931), artist associated with the Kirkcudbright School. Lived at 120 King Street.
- David McMath, born 1996 is a Scottish sport shooter. He competed in the men's double trap event at the 2018 Commonwealth Games, winning the gold medal.
- Ted McMinn, born 1962, former professional footballer and commentator, was born in Castle Douglas.
- Kay Mander (1915-2013) was a documentary film director and shooting continuity specialist. She spent most of the rest of her career working in continuity on feature films such as From Russia with Love, The Heroes of Telemark and Fahrenheit 451. In her later years she lived at Castle Douglas.
- James Clerk Maxwell (1831-1879), for physicist and author of Treatise on Electricity and Magnetism, 1873. Maxwell lived at Glenlair, he died in 1879 and is buried in the churchyard at Parton Kirk. His work influenced Albert Einstein who kept a framed photograph of him on his study wall.
- John Muir (1874-1947) was a medical doctor, naturalist and cultural historian in South Africa.
- Sir John Nairne, 1st Baronet (1861-1945), Chief Cashier of the Bank of England and a founding director of the BBC.
- Sir William Peck (1862-1925), was a Scottish astronomer and scientific instrument maker.
- Jerry Rawlings, (1947-2020) Former Ghanaian President whose father was from Castle Douglas.
- Arthur Smith (rugby union), (1933-1975) Scottish rugby player.
- Stansmore Dean Stevenson (1866-1944) was a Scottish artist known for her oil paintings. Associated with the Kirkcudbright School of artists.
- Alan Temperley, author of children's and young adult fiction including Harry and the Wrinklies and his reworking of traditional stories Tales of Galloway.
- Sir William Henry Veno, (1866-1933) creator of Veno's Cough Syrup was the son of a gamekeeper just outside Castle Douglas.
- Kirsty Wark, journalist and television presenter, born in Dumfries, lived in Castle Douglas in infancy before the family moved back to Kilmarnock, Ayrshire.
- William Barbour Wilson (1819-1897), also known as Cabbage Wilson, was the first Mayor of Christchurch New Zealand in 1868.

== Tour of Britain ==
- 2016: The first stage from Glasgow of the 2016 Tour of Britain ended in Castle Douglas on 4 September. The winner was Germany's André Greipel (Team Lotto–Soudal). Mark Cavendish, who had been favourite to win, crashed on the final corner. Cavendish rode away from the crash, which also involved Team Sky's Elia Viviani.
- 2019: The first stage from Glasgow of the 2019 Tour of Britain, which ended in Kirkcudbright on 7 September, passed through Castle Douglas. The winner of this stage was Dutchman Dylan Groenewegen (Team Jumbo–Visma).

== Climate ==
As with the remainder of the UK, Castle Douglas has a climate classified as Oceanic (Köppen: Cfb), resulting in moderate temperatures, year round rainfall, and windy, often cloudy conditions. The nearest Met Office weather station is at Threave, about 1 1/2 miles (2.5 km) west of the town centre. Updated averages for 1991-2020, the nearest weather station of which is in Dundrennan can also be found below.

Climate data for Threave, 73 m (240 ft) asl, 1971–2000, Extremes 1960–
Month	Jan	Feb	Mar	Apr	May	Jun	Jul	Aug	Sep	Oct	Nov	Dec	Year
Record high °C (°F)	12.1 (53.8)	12.9 (55.2)	18.8 (65.8)	23.4 (74.1)	26.9 (80.4)	29.0 (84.2)	30.8 (87.4)	29.2 (84.6)	26.1 (79.0)	20.6 (69.1)	16.0 (60.8)	12.5 (54.5)	30.8 (87.4)
Mean daily maximum °C (°F)	5.8 (42.4)	6.4 (43.5)	8.7 (47.7)	11.5 (52.7)	15.2 (59.4)	17.3 (63.1)	19.4 (66.9)	18.8 (65.8)	15.9 (60.6)	12.4 (54.3)	8.5 (47.3)	6.5 (43.7)	12.2 (54.0)
Mean daily minimum °C (°F)	0.5 (32.9)	0.7 (33.3)	2.1 (35.8)	3.2 (37.8)	5.7 (42.3)	8.5 (47.3)	10.6 (51.1)	10.4 (50.7)	8.3 (46.9)	5.7 (42.3)	2.4 (36.3)	1.0 (33.8)	4.9 (40.9)
Record low °C (°F)	−13.9 (7.0)	−13.3 (8.1)	−12.8 (9.0)	−5 (23)	−2.8 (27.0)	0.2 (32.4)	2.8 (37.0)	−1.7 (28.9)	−2.0 (28.4)	−5.2 (22.6)	−9.1 (15.6)	−14 (7)	−14 (7)
Average precipitation mm (inches)	144.7 (5.70)	106.43 (4.19)	113.04 (4.45)	75.55 (2.97)	68.45 (2.69)	69.31 (2.73)	75.92 (2.99)	96.07 (3.78)	116.29 (4.58)	147.74 (5.82)	143.33 (5.64)	149.83 (5.90)	1,083 (42.6)
Source: Starlings Roost Weather

Climate data for Dundrennan (1991–2020)
Month	Jan	Feb	Mar	Apr	May	Jun	Jul	Aug	Sep	Oct	Nov	Dec	Year
Mean daily maximum °C (°F)	6.4 (43.5)	6.7 (44.1)	8.3 (46.9)	10.8 (51.4)	13.9 (57.0)	16.2 (61.2)	17.9 (64.2)	17.7 (63.9)	15.7 (60.3)	12.5 (54.5)	9.3 (48.7)	7.0 (44.6)	11.9 (53.4)
Mean daily minimum °C (°F)	2.3 (36.1)	2.2 (36.0)	3.0 (37.4)	4.6 (40.3)	7.0 (44.6)	9.8 (49.6)	11.7 (53.1)	11.7 (53.1)	10.2 (50.4)	7.5 (45.5)	4.9 (40.8)	2.8 (37.0)	6.5 (43.7)
Average rainfall mm (inches)	114.9 (4.52)	91.3 (3.59)	88.5 (3.48)	72.2 (2.84)	69.7 (2.74)	81.5 (3.21)	89.5 (3.52)	110.2 (4.34)	100.3 (3.95)	135.7 (5.34)	126.6 (4.98)	126.6 (4.98)	1,206.8 (47.51)
Average rainy days (≥ 1 mm)	15.8	13.5	12.9	12.5	10.9	10.9	12.7	14.0	12.6	15.4	16.1	15.6	162.9
Source: Met Office

== See also ==
- List of places in Dumfries and Galloway
