= Moffat Hospital =

- NHS Dumfries and Galloway
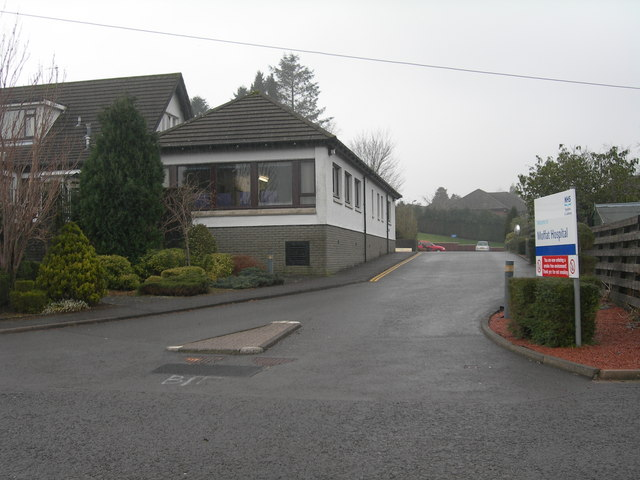
- Entrance to Moffat Hospital

- Shown in Dumfries and Galloway

Geography
- Location: Moffat, Dumfries and Galloway, Scotland
- Coordinates: 55.3314254°N 3.4304219°W

Organisation
- Care system: NHS Scotland
- Type: care of the elderly

Services
- Beds: 8

Links
- Website: www.nhsdg.scot.nhs.uk/Hospitals/Moffat_Hospital
- Other links: List of hospitals in Scotland

Moffat Hospital is a small community hospital at Moffat in Dumfries and Galloway, Scotland. It is managed by NHS Dumfries and Galloway.

== History ==
The hospital, which was designed by Edward Maidman, opened in October 1906. A maternity wing, designed by Evan Tweedie, was added in 1928 and extensive alterations were completed in 1984.

== Services ==
The hospital, which provides consultant-led services for frail elderly patients, has 12 long stay beds for inpatient care and a day hospital for assessment and rehabilitation.
