= Castle Douglas Hospital =

- NHS Dumfries and Galloway
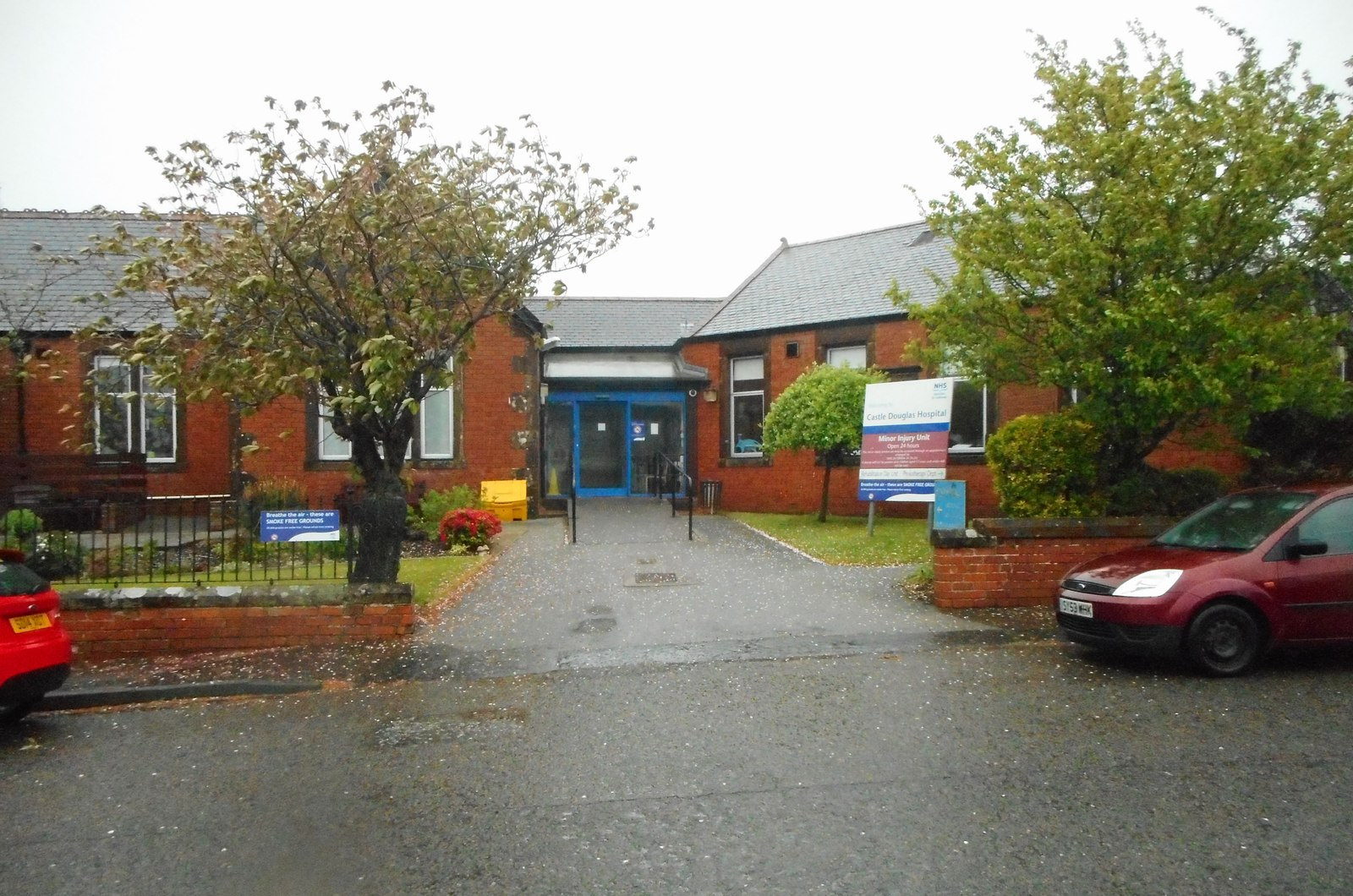
- Castle Douglas Hospital

- Shown in Dumfries and Galloway

Geography
- Location: Academy Street, Castle Douglas, Dumfries and Galloway, Scotland
- Coordinates: 54.9391°N 3.9251°W

Organisation
- Care system: NHS Scotland
- Type: General

History
- Founded: 1899

Links
- Lists: Hospitals in Scotland

Castle Douglas Hospital is a health facility in Academy Street, Castle Douglas, Dumfries and Galloway, Scotland. It is managed by NHS Dumfries and Galloway.

== History ==
The facility, which was commissioned to commemorate Queen Victoria's Diamond Jubilee, was designed by Richard Park (1842-1906) and opened in October 1899. Additions included a nurses' home in 1934 and an out-patients' department in 1935. It joined the National Health Service in 1948.
