= NHS Dumfries and Galloway =

- Type: NHS board
- Headquarters: Bankend Road; Dumfries; DG1 4AP
- Region served: Dumfries and Galloway
- Area size: 6,216 square kilometres
- Population: 148,500
- Hospitals: Annan Hospital; Castle Douglas Hospital; Dumfries and Galloway Royal Infirmary; Galloway Community Hospital; Kirkcudbright Hospital; Lochmaben Hospital; Midpark Hospital; Moffat Hospital; Newton Stewart Hospital; Thomas Hope Hospital; Thornhill Hospital
- Staff: 3,832 (2018/19)
- Website: www.nhsdg.co.uk

NHS Dumfries and Galloway is an NHS board serving the Dumfries and Galloway region. It is one of the fourteen regions of NHS Scotland. NHS Dumfries and Galloway provides health care and promotes healthy living for the people of Dumfries and Galloway.

== History ==
The board was established following the dissolution of several NHS trusts which provided healthcare services in the Dumfries and Galloway area: Dumfries and Galloway Acute and Maternity Hospitals NHS Trust, Dumfries and Galloway Community Health NHS Trust and Dumfries and Galloway Primary Care NHS Trust, all of which were established in the 1990s and dissolved between 1999 and 2003.

In October 2021, Dumfries and Galloway Royal Infirmary was forced to suspend elective clinical procedures in order to be able to deal with the increased demand and staffing shortages which had been aggravated by COVID-19, but assured that urgent and cancer procedures would continue.

== Services ==
The population served is just 146,500, but within a large geographical area of about 2,400 square miles (6,200 km^{2}). Dumfries and Galloway stretches from Langholm in the East to Stranraer in the West, and from Kirkconnel and Carsphairn in the North down to the Solway Coast. There are a number of Community Hospitals throughout the region, and an intermediate unit (including maternity services and medical & surgical beds) in Stranraer.

The board has been building an electronic shared cared record using Graphnet software which is designed to integrate primary and secondary care data for its patients in real time using its software.

Its headquarters are at Mountainhall Treatment Centre (Formerly Dumfries and Galloway Royal Infirmary), Dumfries.

== Hospitals ==
Within Dumfries
Dumfries and Galloway Royal Infirmary • Midpark Hospital
Outwith Dumfries
Annan Hospital • Castle Douglas Hospital • Galloway Community Hospital, Stranraer • Kirkcudbright Hospital • Lochmaben Hospital • Moffat Hospital • Newton Stewart Hospital • Thomas Hope Hospital, Langholm • Thornhill Hospital

== Images ==
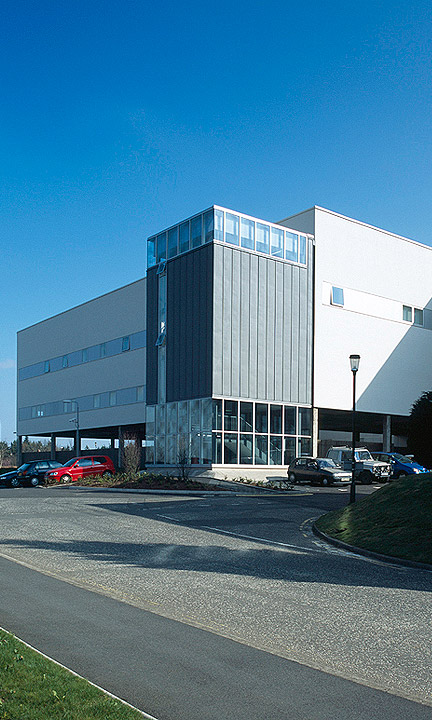
The former Dumfries and Galloway Royal Infirmary, now Mountainhall Treatment Centre.

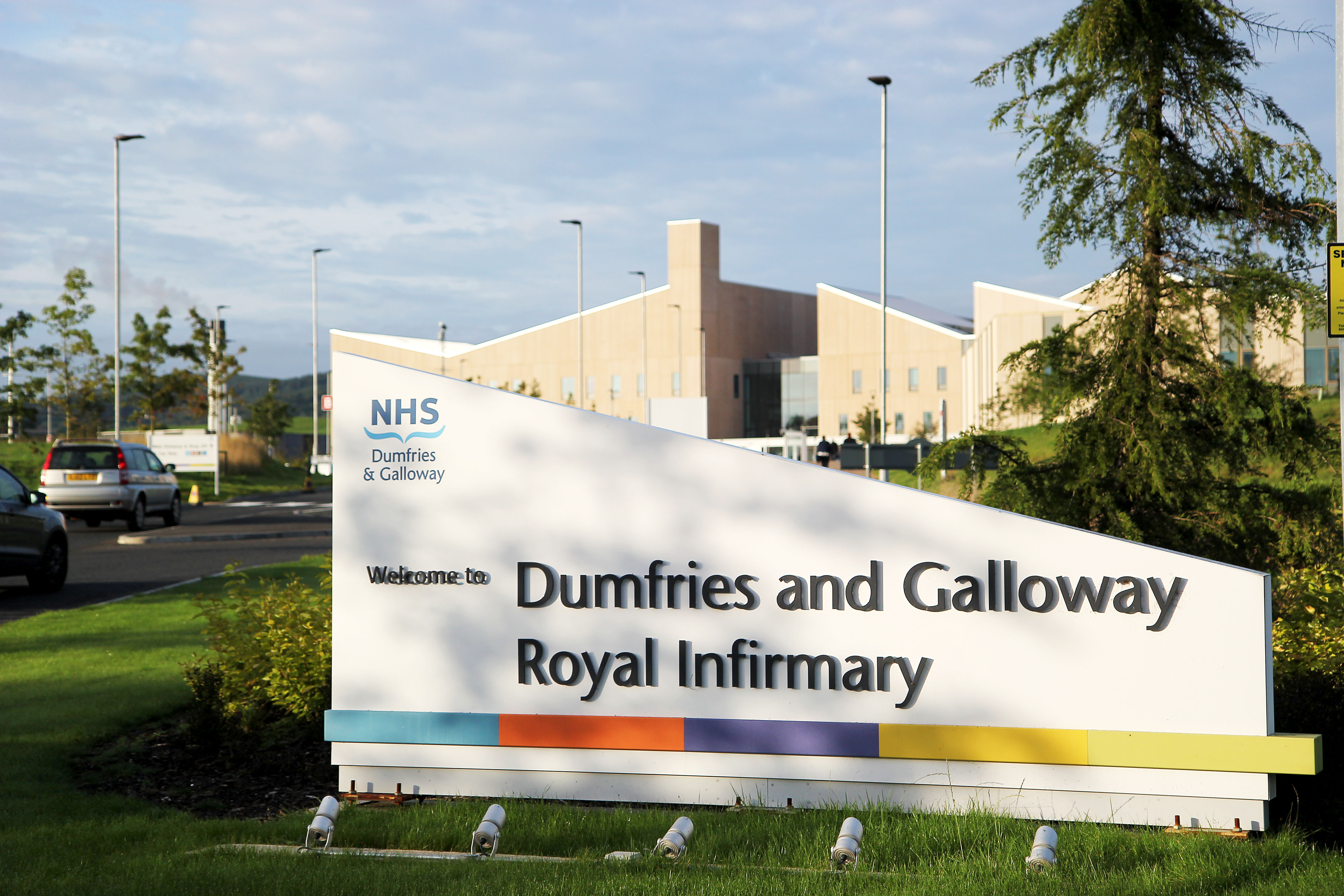
Main Entrance Dumfries and Galloway Royal Infirmary
