= Galloway Community Hospital =

- NHS Dumfries and Galloway
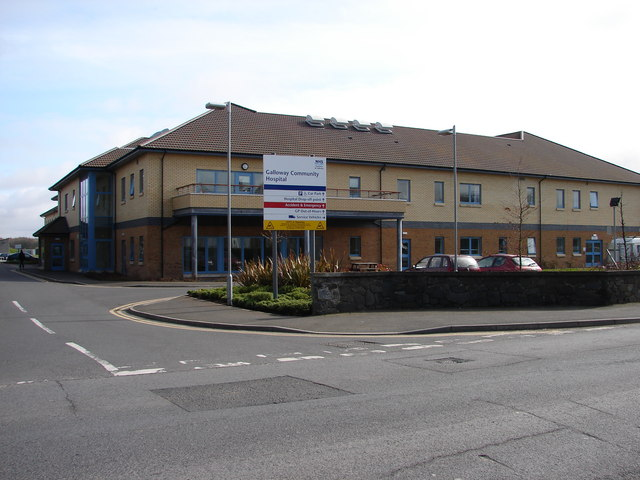
- Galloway Community Hospital

- Shown in Dumfries and Galloway

Geography
- Location: Stranraer, Dumfries and Galloway, Scotland
- Coordinates: 54.89916°N 5.02122°W

Organisation
- Care system: NHS Scotland
- Type: Community

Services
- Emergency department: Yes

History
- Founded: 2006

Links
- Website: Hospital page
- Lists: Hospitals in Scotland

The Galloway Community Hospital is a small hospital in Stranraer, Galloway, Scotland. It is managed by NHS Dumfries and Galloway.

== History ==
The hospital was commissioned to replace the Garrick and Dalrymple hospitals in Stranraer and is located on the site of part of the Dalrymple hospital, adjacent to the Waverley Medical Centre. It opened on a partial basis in September 2006, with the renal unit opening in April 2007.

== Services ==
Services provided at the hospital include accident and emergency. It has stage 1 accreditation as baby friendly.
