= Dumfries and Galloway Royal Infirmary =

- NHS Dumfries and Galloway
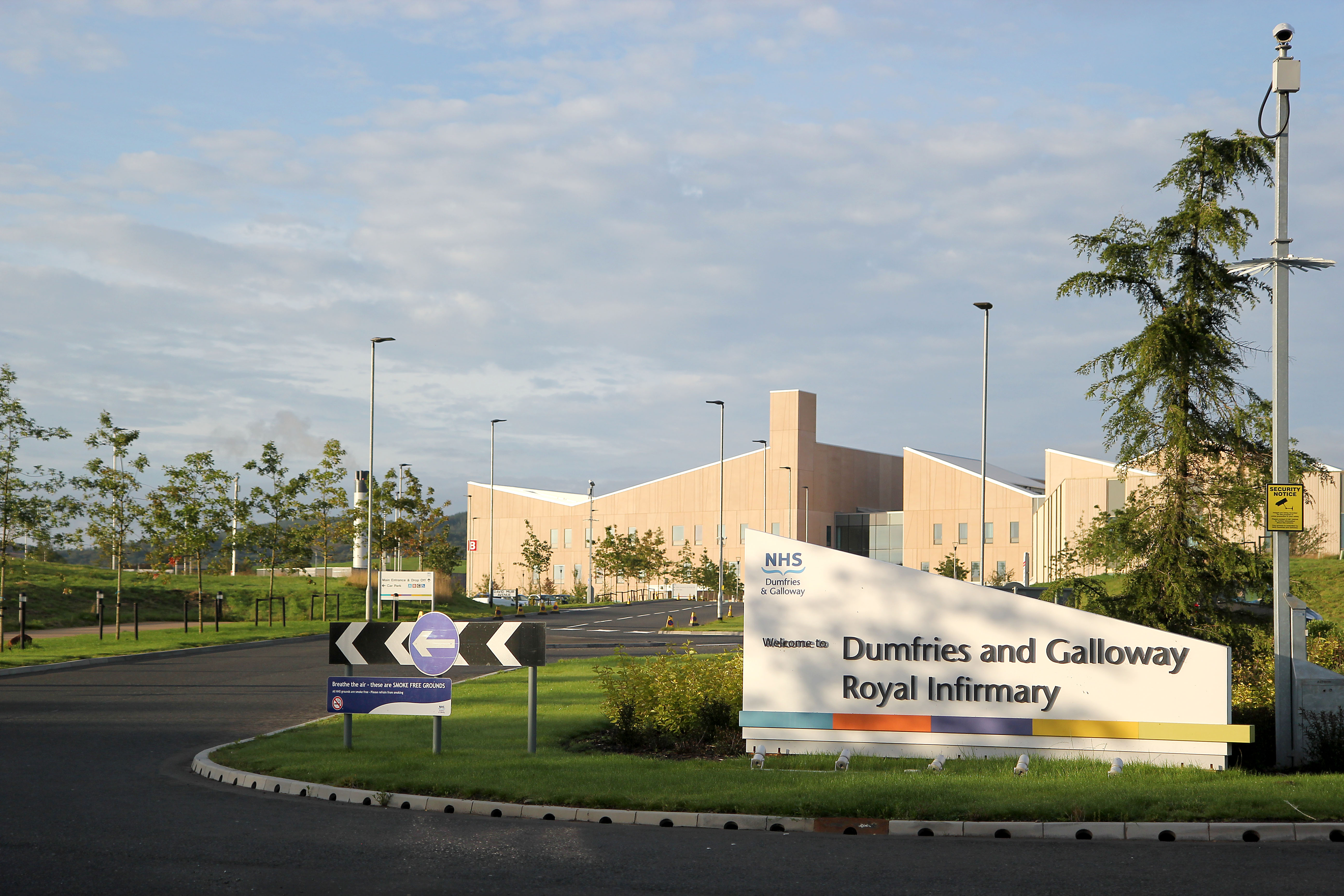
- The new Dumfries and Galloway Royal Infirmary at the Garroch roundabout which opened in 2018

- Shown in Dumfries and Galloway

Geography
- Location: Dumfries, Dumfries and Galloway, Scotland
- Coordinates: 55.0605°N 3.6561°W

Organisation
- Care system: NHS Scotland
- Type: General

Services
- Emergency department: Yes
- Beds: 344

Links
- Website: www.nhsdg.scot.nhs.uk/Hospitals/Dumfries_and_Galloway_Royal_Infirmary

Dumfries and Galloway Royal Infirmary is the main hospital in Dumfries and Galloway, Scotland. The hospital is managed by NHS Dumfries and Galloway.

== History ==
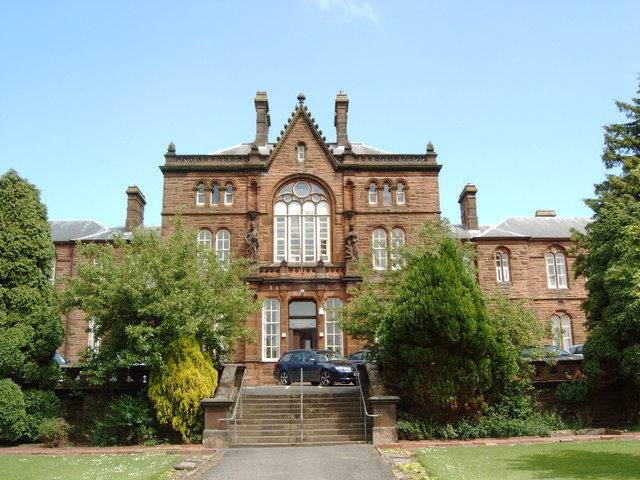
The old hospital at Nithbank

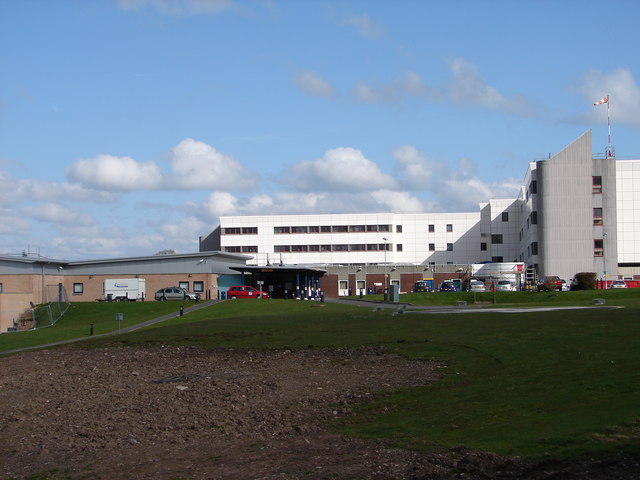
The old hospital at Bankend Road

The hospital has its origins in a small facility at Mill Hole in Burns Street in central Dumfries which opened as the Dumfries Infirmary in 1776.

The hospital moved to High Dock in 1778 before becoming the Dumfries and Galloway Infirmary in 1785 and the Dumfries and Galloway Royal Infirmary in 1807. Dr William Scott administered sulphuric ether, in the first use of anesthetics in the United Kingdom, at the High Dock facility in 1846. The High Dock facility has since been demolished.

The hospital relocated to a new building at Nithbank which was designed by John Starforth, completed in 1873 and was extended in 1897. The hospital joined the National Health Service in 1948. The old Nithbank facility was subsequently used to accommodate the offices of NHS Dumfries and Galloway.

The hospital moved again this time to a facility at Bankend Road, which was designed by Boswell, Mitchell & Johnston and opened by the Queen in 1975. A cancer care centre was opened by Princess Alexandra in 2003. The old Bankend Road facility continues to be used as the Mountainhall Treatment Centre.

In 2012 it was announced that a new 350-bed hospital would be built on the A75 close to the Garroch roundabout. It was procured under a Private Finance Initiative contract in March 2015. The hospital was designed by Ryder Architecture and NBBJ and built by Laing O'Rourke at a cost of £213 million. The new hospital was officially opened by the Princess Royal in July 2018.

== Services ==
The hospital serves the town of Dumfries and the catchment area of South West Scotland with a population of c.150,000. It is made up entirely of single rooms, 344 of them, each with a computer point to allow real-time updating of patient records.

The hospital is a supporter of The Princess Royal Trust for Carers.
