= Newton Stewart Hospital =

- NHS Dumfries and Galloway
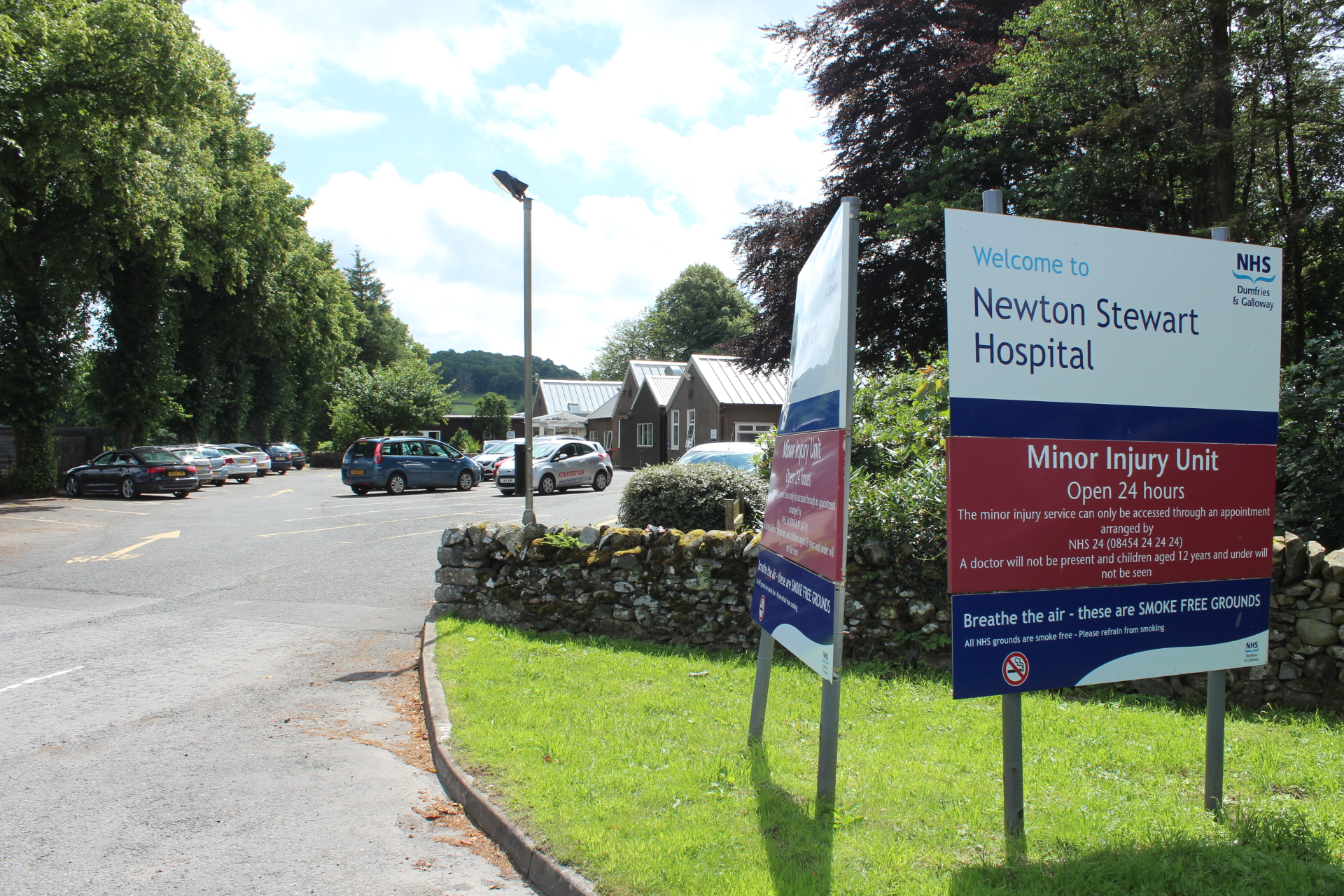
- Newton Stewart Hospital

- Shown in Dumfries and Galloway

Geography
- Location: Newton Stewart, Dumfries and Galloway, Scotland
- Coordinates: 54.9512°N 4.4920°W

Organisation
- Care system: NHS Scotland
- Type: General

History
- Founded: 1904

Links
- Lists: Hospitals in Scotland

Newton Stewart Hospital is a health facility in Newton Stewart, Dumfries and Galloway, Scotland. It is managed by NHS Dumfries and Galloway.

== History ==
The facility has its origins in an infectious diseases hospital which opened in 1904. It joined the National Health Service in 1948. An extension was created by demolishing an adjacent smallpox hospital in the 1970s. The trust decided to limit the number of bed spaces to 14 due to staff shortages in 2018.
