= The Fullarton =

Theatre in Castle Douglas, Scotland

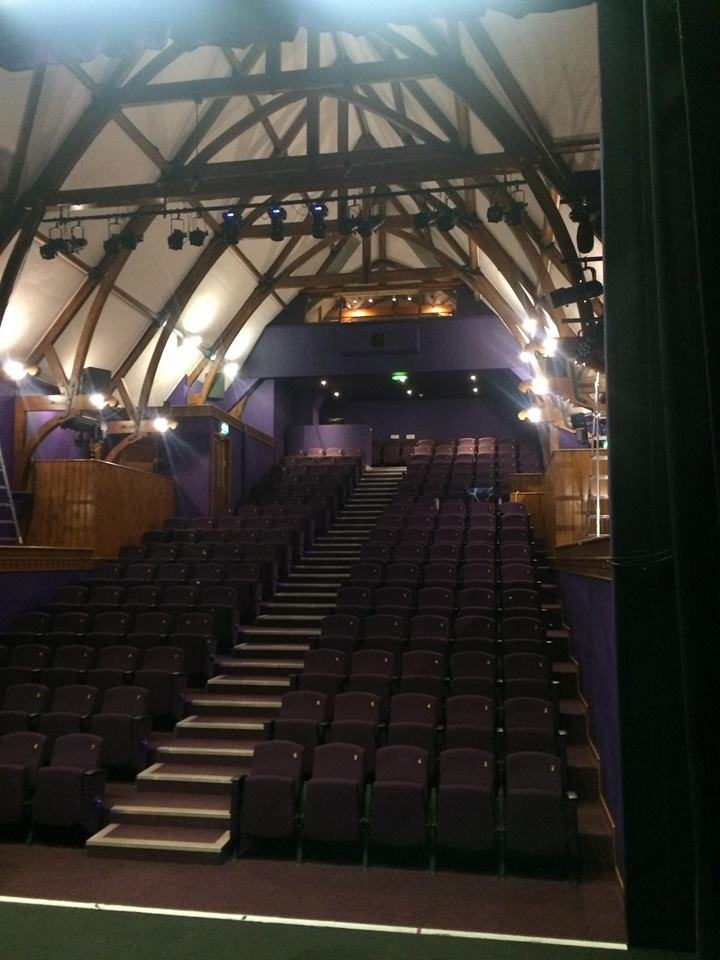
- Interactive map of The Fullarton
- Former names: Lochside Theatre, St Andrew's Church
- Address: Lochside Road, Castle Douglas DG7 1EU
- Coordinates: 54°56′13″N 3°55′51″W
- Owner: Fullarton Theatre Holdings Ltd
- Capacity: 166
- Type: Theatre

Construction
- Opened: 1996 (as a Theatre)

The Fullarton is a performing arts theatre and entertainment venue in the town of Castle Douglas in the historical county of Kirkcudbrightshire in Dumfries and Galloway, Scotland.

Before the acquisition and opening of The Fullarton (then Lochside Theatre) in 1990, Castle Douglas had previously only one theatre called the Little Theatre, in an old army hut run by the Unity Players. It was closed in the 1970s due to a failure in requirements to run safely as a theatre. In 1984, the late Donald Fullarton, (whose daughter Morag Fullarton is a theatre and television director ), a member of the Scottish Community Drama Association subsequently formed the Galloway Arts Project with the help of local amateur dramatics clubs.

The former St Andrew's Church became available in the 1990s, and was subsequently purchased by the project and funding was provided by both the Stewartry District Council and the Dumfries and Galloway Regional Council. In the mid 1990s, further major funds were provided by the newly founded National Lottery and opened as a functioning theatre in 1996.

The theatre was refurbished in 2013 in order to meet changing requirements for performance spaces, and was changed from the Lochside Theatre to The Fullarton Theatre in tribute to Donald Fullarton.

Currently, it holds performances, conferences and also is used as a local cinema. It is also used by the member clubs of the Scottish Community Drama Association, most recently holding the SCDA One-Act Western Divisional Festival in March 2018.
