= Lochmaben Hospital =

- NHS Dumfries and Galloway
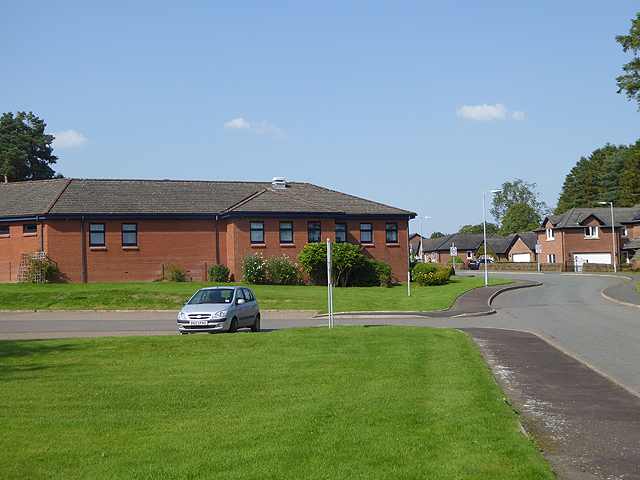
- Lochmaben Hospital

- Shown in Dumfries and Galloway

Geography
- Location: Stapleton Road, Lochmaben, Dumfries and Galloway, Scotland
- Coordinates: 55.1280°N 3.4534°W

Organisation
- Care system: NHS Scotland
- Type: General

History
- Founded: 1908

Links
- Lists: Hospitals in Scotland

Lochmaben Hospital is a health facility in Woodlands Drive, Lochmaben, Dumfries and Galloway, Scotland. It is managed by NHS Dumfries and Galloway.

== History ==
The facility has its origins in an infectious diseases hospital which opened in May 1908. It joined the National Health Service as the Lochmaben Sanatorium in 1948. By the 1970s the sanatorium was getting old, and after a small modern facility had been built just to the south, the sanatorium closed and was demolished in 2000.
