= Kirkcudbright Hospital =

- NHS Dumfries and Galloway
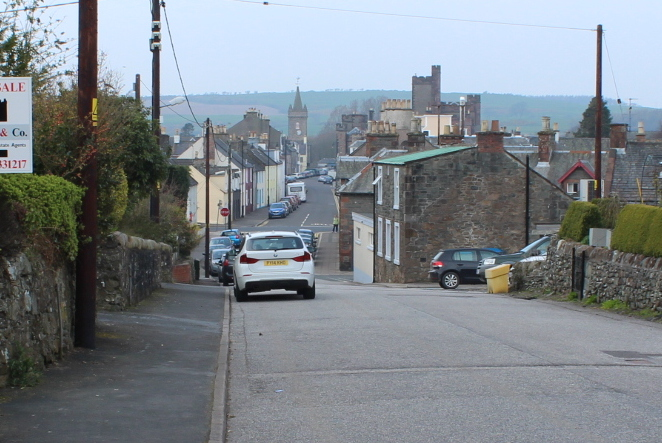
- The hospital is the low cream building on the right

- Shown in Dumfries and Galloway

Geography
- Location: Barrhill Road, Kirkcudbright, Dumfries and Galloway, Scotland
- Coordinates: 54.8346°N 4.0504°W

Organisation
- Care system: NHS Scotland
- Type: General

History
- Founded: 1897

Links
- Lists: Hospitals in Scotland

Kirkcudbright Hospital is a health facility in Barrhill Road, Kirkcudbright, Dumfries and Galloway, Scotland. It is managed by NHS Dumfries and Galloway.

== History ==
The facility was created by the conversion of Townend School, which occupied a mid-19th-century building, to the designs of Mr Wallace, a local architect, in 1897. An operating theatre was added in 1921. The hospital joined the National Health Service in 1948.
