= Annan Hospital =

- NHS Dumfries and Galloway
- Shown in Dumfries and Galloway

Geography
- Location: Stapleton Road, Annan, Dumfries and Galloway, Scotland
- Coordinates: 54.9886°N 3.2468°W

Organisation
- Care system: NHS Scotland
- Type: General

History
- Founded: 1987

Links
- Lists: Hospitals in Scotland

Annan Hospital is a health facility in Stapleton Road, Annan, Dumfries and Galloway, Scotland. It is managed by NHS Dumfries and Galloway.

== History ==
The facility is a small community hospital which opened in 1987. In the early 21st century it began to specialise in palliative care and rehabilitation. It was forced to close for three days during a gastroenteritis outbreak in 2016.
