= Thomas Hope Hospital =

- NHS Dumfries and Galloway
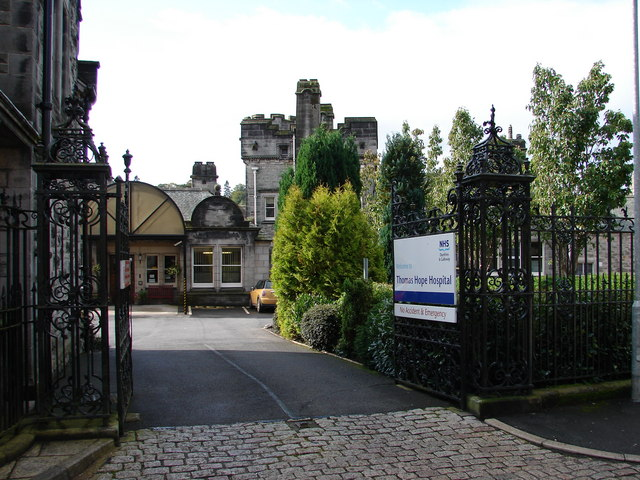
- Thomas Hope Hospital

- Shown in Dumfries and Galloway

Geography
- Location: Market Place, Langholm, Dumfries and Galloway, Scotland
- Coordinates: 55.1507°N 2.9999°W

Organisation
- Care system: NHS Scotland
- Type: General

History
- Founded: 1897

Links
- Lists: Hospitals in Scotland

Thomas Hope Hospital is a health facility at Market Place, Langholm, Dumfries and Galloway, Scotland. It is managed by NHS Dumfries and Galloway.

== History ==
The facility was financed by a large legacy from Thomas Hope, a retailing entrepreneur who had worked in the United States. It was designed by John Henry Townsend Wodd in the Jacobean style and opened as the Thomas Hope Hospital for the Poor in 1897. The design included an octagonal mortuary. The hospital joined the National Health Service as the Thomas Hope Hospital in 1948.
