= Ellangowan House =

House in Dumfries and Galloway, Scotland

Coordinates: 55.0532°N 3.5895°W

Ellangowan House, also known as Ellangowan, is a Victorian Gothic house on the east side of Bankend Road, south-east of Dumfries, in Dumfries and Galloway, Scotland. It was built about 1869 and has been a Category B listed building, together with its gatepiers, since 26 June 1986. Dumfries and Galloway Council's conservation area appraisal attributes the design to the Dumfries architect James Barbour. The house lies within the Crichton Conservation Area, which is centred on the former Crichton Royal Institution.

== History ==
According to Historic Environment Scotland, the house was built for James MacGowan, Chamberlain of the burgh of Dumfries, who funded the restoration of the Midsteeple. In January 1883 the Dumfries and Galloway Standard listed "James H. M'Gowan of Ellangowan" among subscribers to a local charity. The funeral of James Hairstens M'Gowan "of Ellangowan" left the house for Dumfries Cemetery on 15 March 1918.

An Ordnance Survey 25-inch map published in 1900 shows Ellangowan and its outbuildings.

On 6 June 1997 Dumfries and Galloway Council designated the Crichton Conservation Area, which included "Ellangowan, Midpark and Rosebank with the adjacent land and properties fronting Bankend Road". The council's appraisal records that leaving out properties with little operational connection with the hospital, such as Ellangowan, was considered, but that the wider boundary was kept because some of those properties protect the views and the wider setting.

== Architecture ==
The house is asymmetrical, of two storeys and an attic, built of snecked bull-faced red ashlar with polished dressings and slate roofs. A tall four-stage octagonal entrance tower stands in the angle between the main block and a lower, recessed south wing. The tower has a pointed doorway, corbelled balconies with pierced parapets, and a tall faceted roof with lucarnes and a weathervane finial. The west front has three irregular bays, the outer bays advanced and gabled, and a corbelled first-floor oriel window carried on a single column with a foliated capital. A billiard room at the rear (east) has a glazed cupola. Inside are marble chimneypieces, panelled doors and a stair with turned wooden balusters.

The gatepiers are square and chamfered, of red ashlar, linked by curved quadrant walls. The taller inner piers have ball finials, and the gates are of decorative wrought iron. The national record of the historic environment lists the house and the gate piers as separate sub-sites.

To the south of the house is Ellangowan coach house, a vernacular-style building used as a dwelling. It has its own access from Bankend Road, which passes the remaining buildings of Rosebank farm.

== Grounds ==
The house stands at about 70 m (230 ft) above sea level. It is approached through the gatepiers, up a gently sloping, winding drive lined with mature trees, and is largely unseen from the road. The appraisal states that, while the designed landscapes around the neighbouring houses of Midpark and Rosebank were altered for the golf course and Midpark Hospital, Ellangowan kept much of its immediate landscaped setting. It names the landscape around Ellangowan as one of the individually special elements of the Crichton non-inventory designed landscape, although the full design is no longer complete.
