= Midpark Hospital =

- NHS Dumfries and Galloway
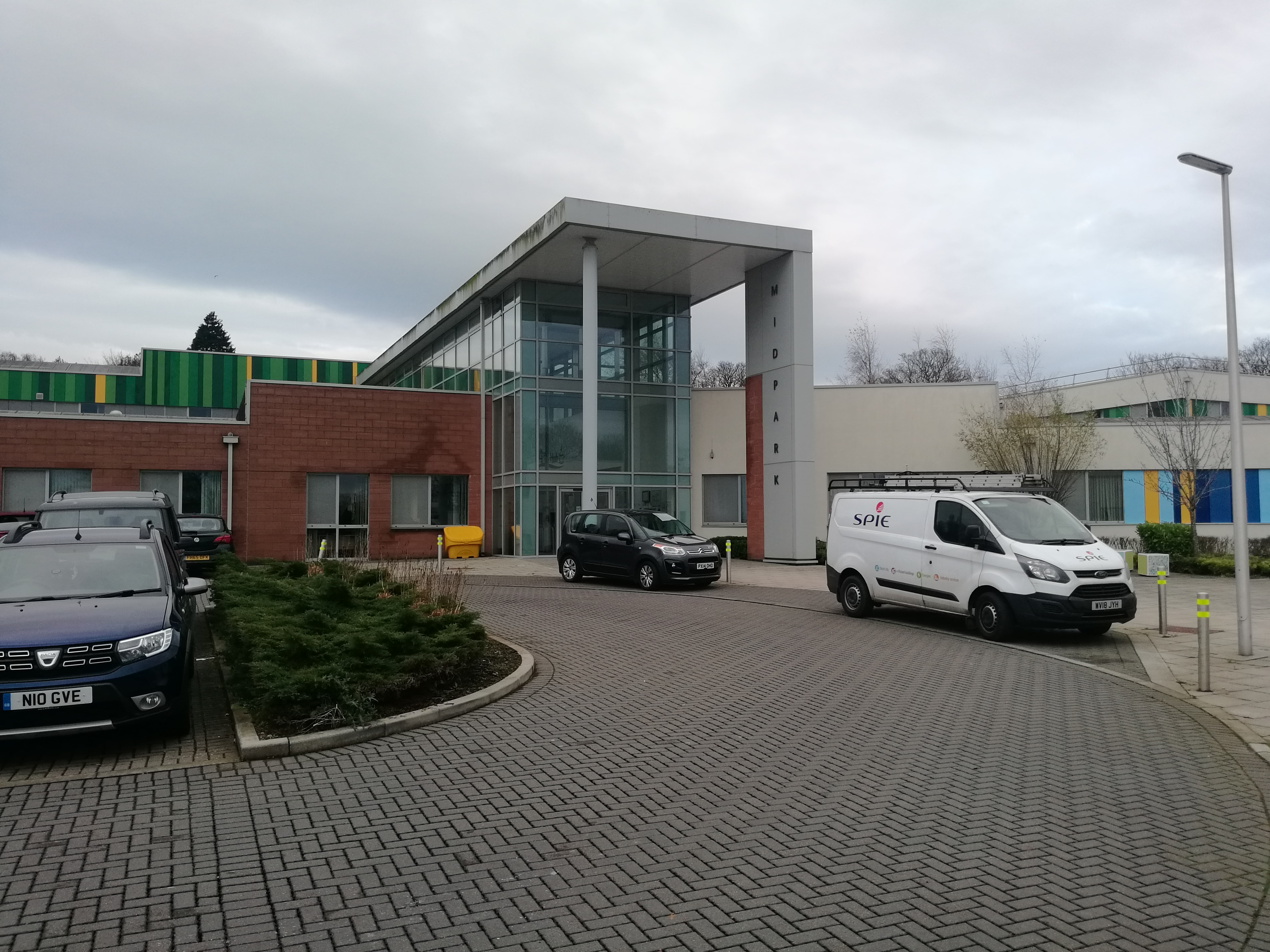
- Entrance to Midpark Hospital

- Shown in Dumfries and Galloway

Geography
- Location: Dumfries, Dumfries and Galloway, Scotland, United Kingdom
- Coordinates: 55.0517°N 3.5891°W

Organisation
- Care system: NHS Scotland
- Type: Acute Mental Health Unit

Services
- Emergency department: No Accident & Emergency
- Beds: 85

History
- Founded: 2012

Links
- Website: www.nhsdg.scot.nhs.uk/Hospitals/Midpark_Hospital
- Lists: Hospitals in Scotland

Midpark Hospital is a modern acute mental health unit located in Dumfries. The hospital is managed by NHS Dumfries and Galloway.

== History ==
=== Design ===
The hospital was designed to replace aging accommodation at a number of sites: the Cree West ward at the Crichton Royal Hospital; the hospice block at the Crichton; Lahraig at the Nithbank site; and the Wellgreen cottages at Glencaple Road. It was one of the first projects to be procured through Frameworks Scotland.

The architects for the new hospital were Ingenium Archial Ltd, with WSP and Arups handling engineering aspects. The landscape architects for the site were award-winning Glasgow firm erz Ltd who designed the campus, the courtyards, the entry areas and the woodland setting. the site is typified by its colourful planting and useful, therapeutic outdoor spaces. The building incorporates best practice design for people with dementia and mental illness and has received a BREEAM rating of "excellent".

The entrance garden DoubleWalk was designed by Jencks2, a partnership between Charles Jencks and Lilly Jencks. The garden features a 'landform' typical of Charles Jencks' work. He describes it as "A landform that pulls in the distant landscape of the Criffel mountain, the Nith River, Dumfries and the cosmic setting."

The project received the following awards: 2011 Health Facilities Scotland Awards (design commendation), 2012 NHS Scotland HFS Environment and Design Award (winner) and the BREEM awards 2015 (shortlisted).

=== Construction ===
Construction work on the new hospital started in 2010. It was built by Laing O'Rourke at a cost of £29 million and officially opened by the Duchess of Gloucester in May 2012.

== Services ==
The hospital has six ward areas: Balcary (intensive psychiatric care), Cree (older adult assessment), Dalveen (rehabilitation), Ettrick (adult acute admissions), Glencairn (older adult acute admissions) and Nithsdale (adult acute admissions).

== Friends of Midpark Hospital ==
The "Friends of Midpark Hospital" was set up to help coordinate volunteers and became a registered charity (registered charity number SC042993) in 2012.
