= Carlingwark Loch =

Lake in Dumfries and Galloway, Scotland

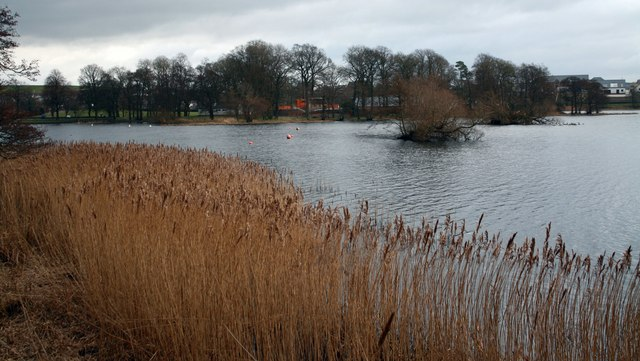
- Carlingwark Loch - geograph.org.uk - 1180333

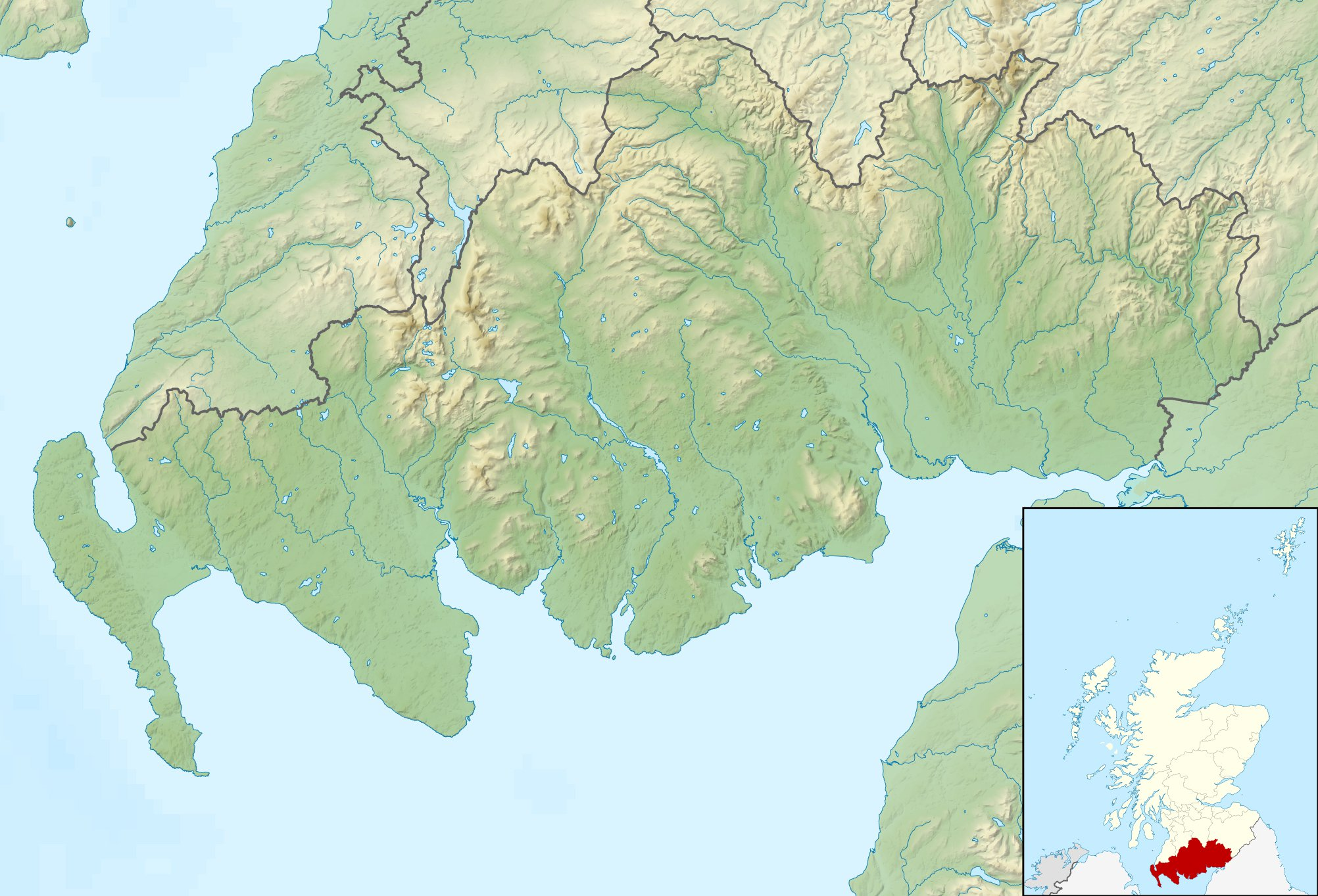
- Location within Dumfries and Galloway
- Coordinates: 54°55′48″N 3°56′1″W
- Type: freshwater loch
- Primary inflows: Gelston burn
- Primary outflows: Carlingwark Lane
- Catchment area: 13.05 km^{2} (5.04 sq mi)
- Basin countries: Scotland
- Max. length: 0.7 mi (1.1 km)
- Max. width: 0.33 mi (0.53 km)
- Average depth: 7 ft (2.1 m)
- Max. depth: 17 ft (5.2 m)
- Water volume: 3,100,000 ft^{3} (88,000 m^{3})
- Surface elevation: 143 ft (44 m)

Carlingwark Loch is a small freshwater loch in the historical county of Kirkcudbrightshire, Dumfries and Galloway, Scotland lying just south of Castle Douglas and is roughly rectangular in shape, trending nearly north and south. The name of the loch comes from the Scots Gaelic word Caer meaning fort and wark the old Scots language word for work. There are four artificial islets in the loch showing evidence of fortification and settlement, Ash Island is thought to be a crannog. Several archaeological finds have been retrieved from the loch including a bronze cauldron, sword and pan and two dugout canoes.

Carlingwark Lane is a 1.5 mile canal which opened between the loch and the River Dee, 1.5 miles away in 1765. It remained in use until its abandonment in about 1840, allowing flat-bottomed boats to transport shell-marl to farms along the route.

There is a 5.25 km (3.26 mi) footpath around the loch and it is popular for bird watching and fishing. As of 5 March 2012 the loch and the land around it has been designated as a Site of Special Scientific Interest on account of its varied birdlife and grassland.

In 1903 the loch was surveyed by E.R. Watson and later charted as part of The Bathymetrical Survey of Fresh-Water Lochs of Scotland 1897–1909.

In 2009 an aerating fountain was installed at a cost of £10,000 to try to prevent the build-up of blue-green algae. The funding was provided by South West Scotland Environmental Action Trust. The installation of the fountain was part of a wider development of Carlingwark Outdoor Activity Centre by Dumfries and Galloway Council. However, further research showed that, owing to the relatively shallow depth of the loch, the fountain is ineffective and its use was discontinued. Barley straw, added twice a year, has been used very successfully up to 2019 to reduce the blue-green algae levels.
