= Castle Douglas Auction Mart =

Coordinates: 54°56′33″N 3°55′28″W

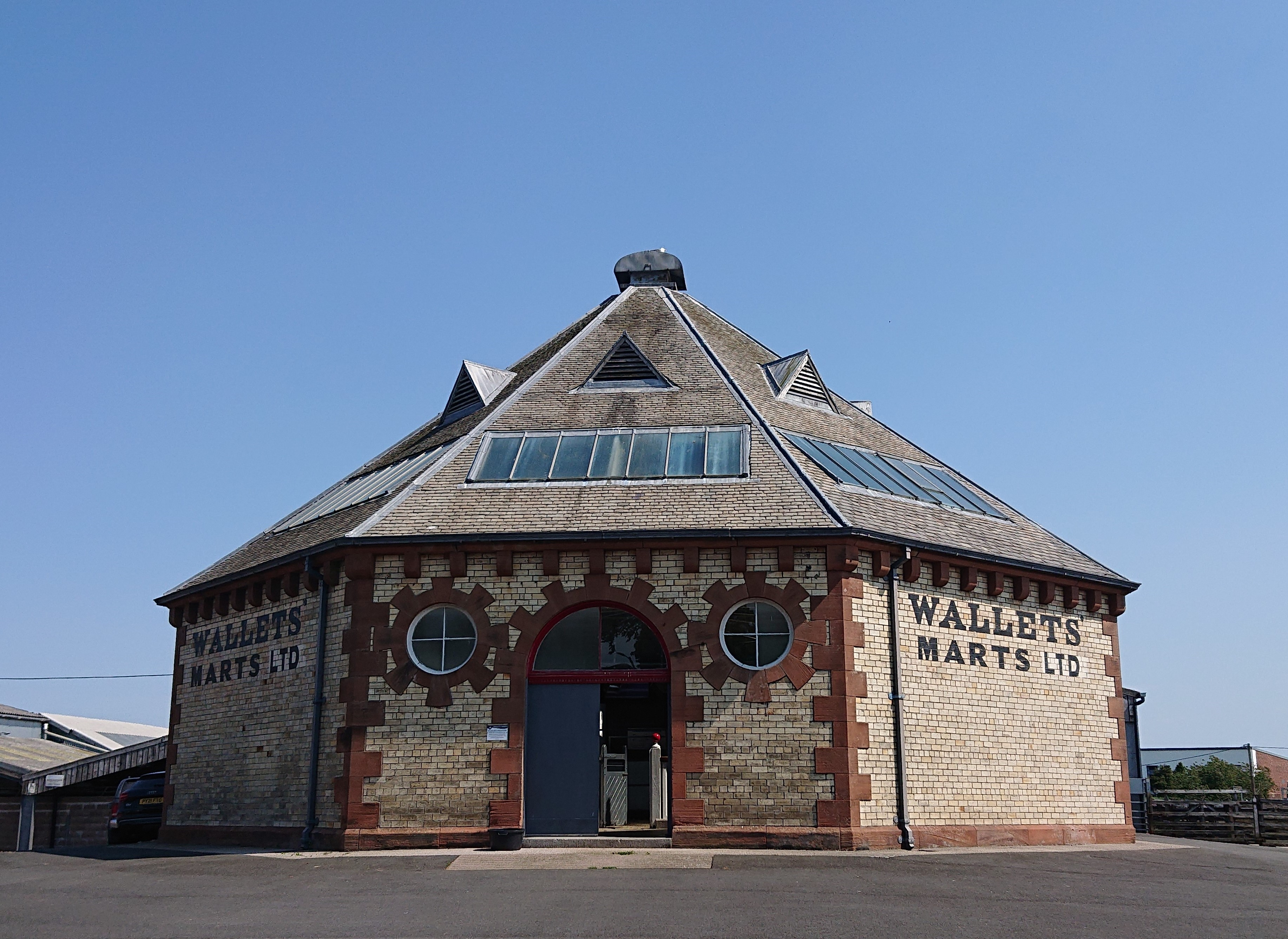
- Interactive map of the Castle Douglas Auction Mart area

General information
- Type: Cattle market
- Location: Castle Douglas, Dumfries and Galloway, Scotland

Technical details
- Material: Brick and sandstone

Design and construction
- Designations: Category A listed building

The Auction Mart on New Market Street in Castle Douglas is an octagonal building, constructed around 1900 as a cattle market, and used for that purpose since its construction. It is owned by Wallets Marts, a firm that has operated a cattle market on the site since 1888. It was designated a Category A listed building in 1990.

== Description ==
The octagonal polychrome building is made mostly of yellow brick with red sandstone detailing at the corners and around the doors and windows. Its main entrance is a round-arched doorway with a semi-circular fanlight, and is flanked by two round four-pane windows. The roof, which is supported by red sandstone corbels, is conical, is made of faceted slate, and is pierced by skylights and triangular lucarne ventilators.

== Interior ==
The interior has been largely unchanged since its construction. The walls are lined with timber, and tiers of wooden seating surround the balustraded auction ring. The roof is supported by metal rods radiating out from a central dropped lantern.

== History ==
In 1860, the introduction of railways connected Castle Douglas to Dumfries and, in the next few years, other nearby towns including Stranraer, Port Patrick and Kirkcudbright. This reinforced Castle Douglas's position as a centre of trade, particularly as a cattle market.

The site on which the auction mart stands has been occupied by Wallets Marts since 1888. The building was constructed around 1900, and is still operated as a cattle market by Wallets Marts, specialising in the sale of Galloway cattle. It was designated a Category A listed building in 1990, and is noted by Historic Environment Scotland as an "unusually complete and fine example of a cattle market sale ring".

== Sources ==
- Historic Environment Scotland. "New Market Street Castle Douglas Cattle Mart (Category A Listed Building LB22976)".
- Gifford, John (1996). The Buildings of Scotland:Dumfries and Galloway. London: Penguin. ISBN 0140-71067-1.
- Hume, John R (2000). Dumfries and Galloway: An Illustrated Architectural Guide. The Rutland Press. ISBN 1-873-190-344.
- "Castle Douglas Auction Mart". Gazetteer for Scotland.
