= Threave Gardens =

Coordinates: 54°55′23.26″N 3°56′47.41″W

Designations

Inventory of Gardens and Designed Landscapes in Scotland
- Official name: Threave Gardens
- Designated: 30 June 1987
- Reference no.: GDL00372

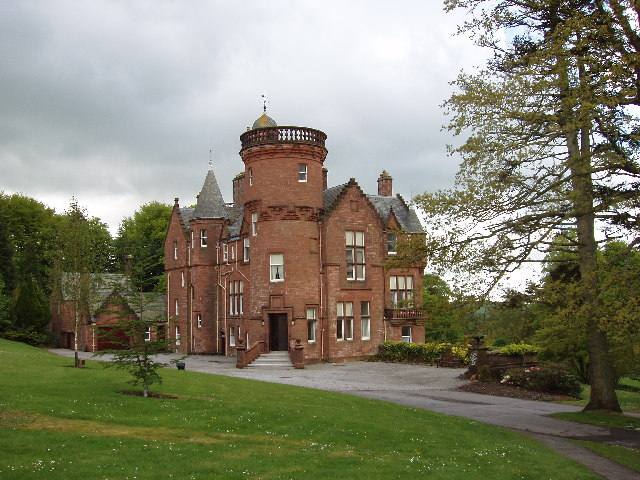
Threave House

Threave Garden and Estate is a series of gardens owned and managed by the National Trust for Scotland, located near Castle Douglas in the historical county of Kirkcudbrightshire in Dumfries and Galloway region of Scotland.

Covering 64 acres (26 ha), the gardens are part of the 1,500 acres (607 ha) Threave Estate originally developed by William Gordon who bought the estate in 1867. Since 1960 the garden is home to the School of Heritage Gardening.

The gardens include a working walled garden, a rock garden, several ponds and water features. There is also a visitor centre and plant centre. The wider estate is managed as a nature reserve and is home to bats and ospreys, and includes part of the Loch Ken and River Dee Marshes Special Protection Area. Threave Castle is located on an island in the River Dee, at the north-west side of the estate.

The garden is listed in the Inventory of Gardens and Designed Landscapes in Scotland, the national listing of significant gardens, which is maintained by National Trust for Scotland.
