= Agnes McDonald =

Anges McDonald
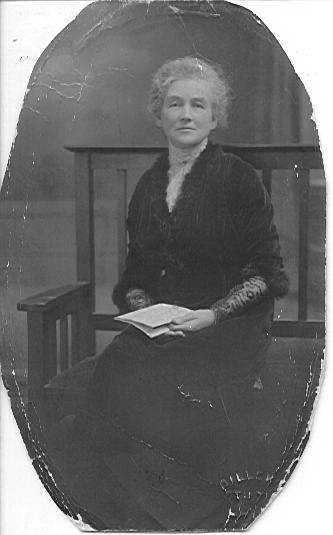
- Born: 2 September 1829; Castle Douglas, Scotland
- Died: 28 November 1906 (aged 77)

Agnes McDonald (2 September 1829 – 28 November 1906) was an early European settler to New Zealand, working as a nurse, postmistress and teacher. Living in Māori dominant regions she and her husband served as an important link between Māori and European settler communities.

== Early life ==
Born Agnes Carmont in Castle Douglas, Scotland her parents were Elizabeth Caven and John Carmont. While her parents were farmers she spent most of her upbringing in Glasgow, in the household of Dr. McCarthney, her uncle. She assisted him in his dispensary through which she gained a knowledge of medicine. This would prove valuable to her after she settled in rural New Zealand. The opportunity to immigrate to New Zealand arose through a job working as a companion to Mary Ann Cliffod, the wife of Sir Charles Clifford.

== Life in New Zealand ==
Agnes arrived in Wellington, New Zealand in 1850. She worked for three years as a companion to Mary Ann Clifford. In 1854 she married trader Hector McDonald, also of Scotland. Hector had been previously married to Te Kopi, a niece of Te Rauparaha. They had had one child together, a boy called Hugh. Te Kopi is thought to have died, possibly in childbirth, in 1848. At the time of Hector marrying Agnes he had gained a lease of 12,000 acres of land from Muaūpoko and hapu from Ngāti Raukawa. The couple moved to this land in Ōtaki where Hector ran 12,000 sheep. With only two European neighbours Agnes learned te reo and raised her children to be bilingual. Along with raising Hugh she would go on to have ten more children in total, five daughters and five sons.

In 1858 the family moved to the mouth of the Hokia stream. Hector established an accommodation house as a stop over for the Cobb & Company's mail coach service. This new residence was well suited to accommodate for the coach as well as running Hectors original run. Here Agnes had 6 more children and worked long hours operating the accommodation house and raising and educating her family.

In the 1860s, Agnes was witness to epidemics of influenza and scrofula that affected the region. Her medical knowledge and services were crucial to the treatment of children and families during this time. In the 1870s she travelled to Wellington where she was able to acquire a medical chest paid for by the government so that she could use her medical knowledge to treat children and families in her region. Through treating scrofula she was able to find a cure for the fatal variants of the disease in the form of iodine. Although she became well known for her remedies not all her patients were willing. She actively sought out sufferers of scrofula in the surrounding pa to undergo treatment.

The land the McDonalds lived on was purchased by the government as part of the Levin Block. The land was divided and sold to other European settlers.

Agnes died in 1906 and was buried beside her husband in their family cemetery near Lake Horowhenua.
