= James Barbour (architect) =

Scottish architect

James Barbour (1834—5 May 1912) was a Scottish architect responsible for over four hundred buildings in Dumfriesshire and Kirkcudbrightshire. His twin brother Robert set up the drapers shop in Dumfries which went on to become the business R Barbour & Sons.

James Barbour was born in Dunscore and began his training in Dumfries in c. 1848-1849 with Walter Newall. He set up his own practice in 1860.

He was a member of the Dumfriesshire and Galloway Natural History and Antiquarian Society and Fellow of the Society of Antiquaries of Scotland. He excavated the Roman site at Birrens.

== Works ==
Buildings in and around the former Crichton Royal Institution, Dumfries, which Dumfries and Galloway Council's conservation area appraisal credits to Barbour include:

- Ellangowan House, Bankend Road (1869), a Victorian Gothic house in red sandstone with an octagonal tower; Category B listed.
- Spittalfield Cottages, Glencaple Road (1876), a semi-detached pair of red sandstone cottages.
- Midpark, Bankend Road: a later sandstone frontage added to an earlier house, with distinctive straight, stack-bonded chimneys; Category C listed.
- Low Lodge, Glencaple Road (1904, attributed); Category C listed with its entrance piers, walls and railings.
- Upper Brownhall Lodge at Grierson Gate, Bankend Road (1904, attributed), with a tall straight chimney and an Arts and Crafts style half-timbered porch; the lodge, gateway, wall and railings are Category B listed.
