= Liberton, Edinburgh =

Suburb of Edinburgh, Scotland

Coordinates: 55°54′51.67″N 3°9′42.76″W

Liberton: Scots: Libby
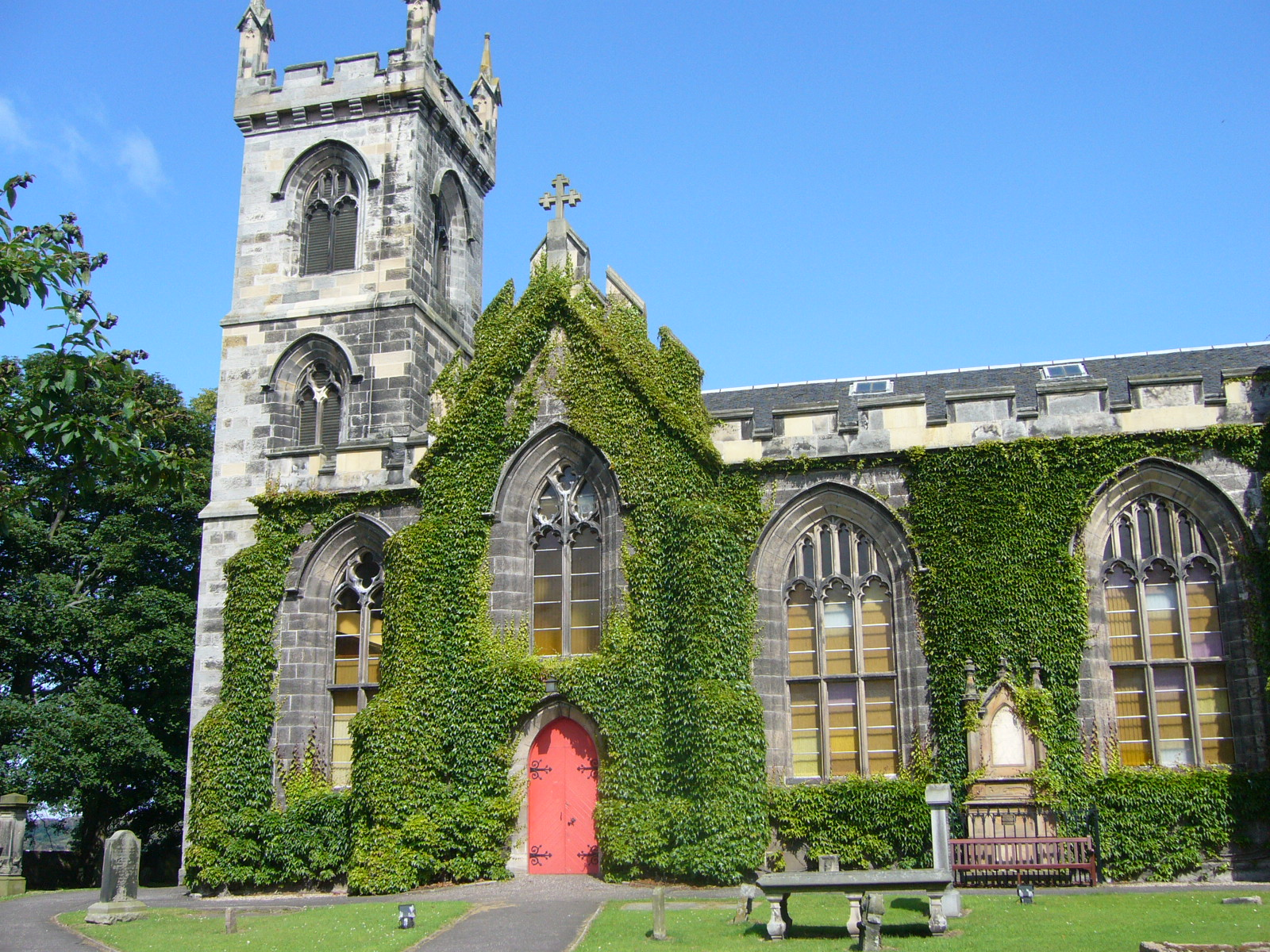
- Liberton Kirk

- Location within the City of Edinburgh council area Location within Scotland
- OS grid reference: NT274696
- Council area: City of Edinburgh
- Lieutenancy area: Edinburgh
- Country: Scotland
- Sovereign state: United Kingdom
- Post town: EDINBURGH
- Postcode district: EH16
- Dialling code: 0131
- Police: Scotland
- Fire: Scottish
- Ambulance: Scottish
- UK Parliament: Edinburgh South
- Scottish Parliament: Edinburgh Southern

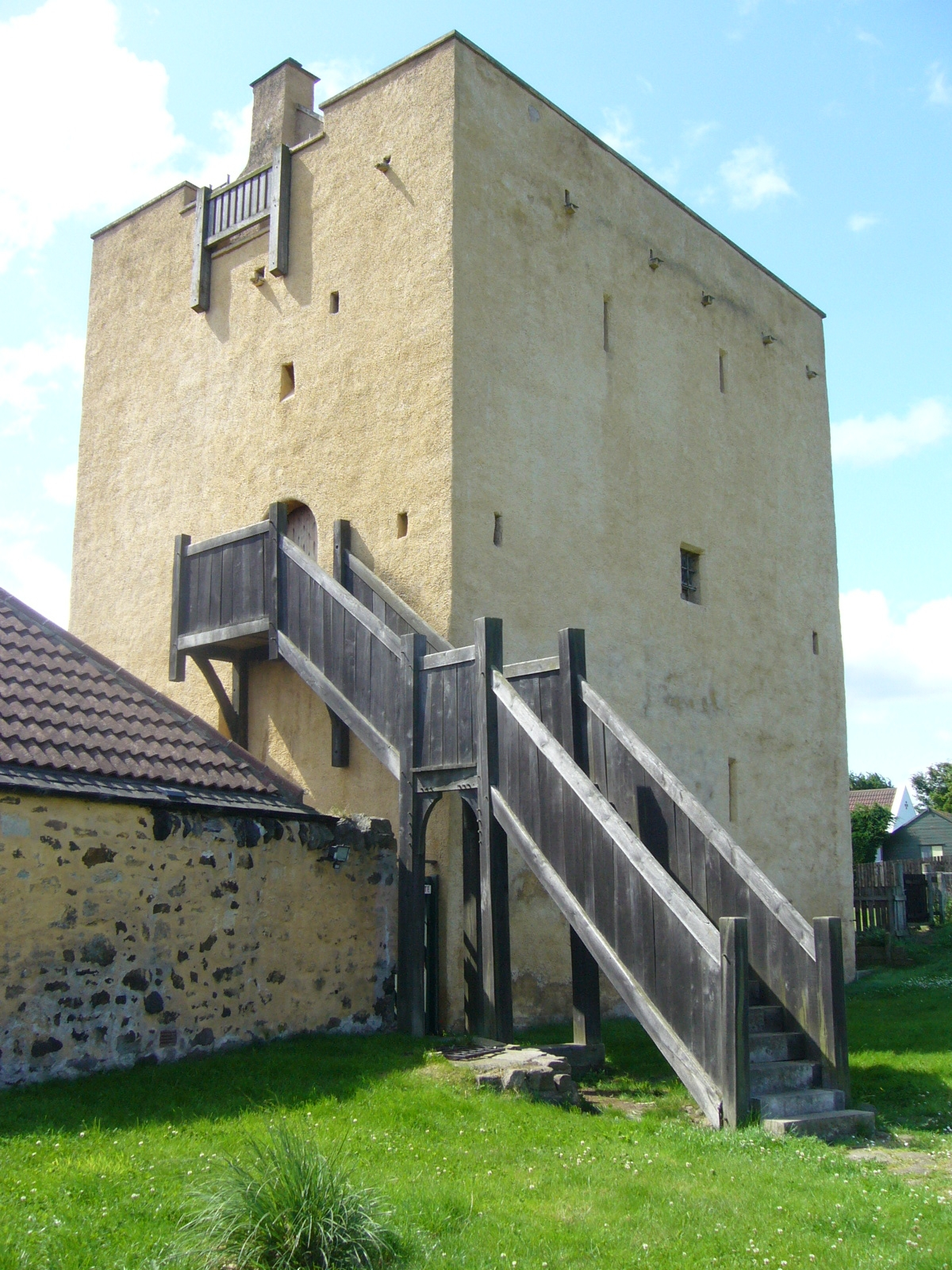
Liberton Tower

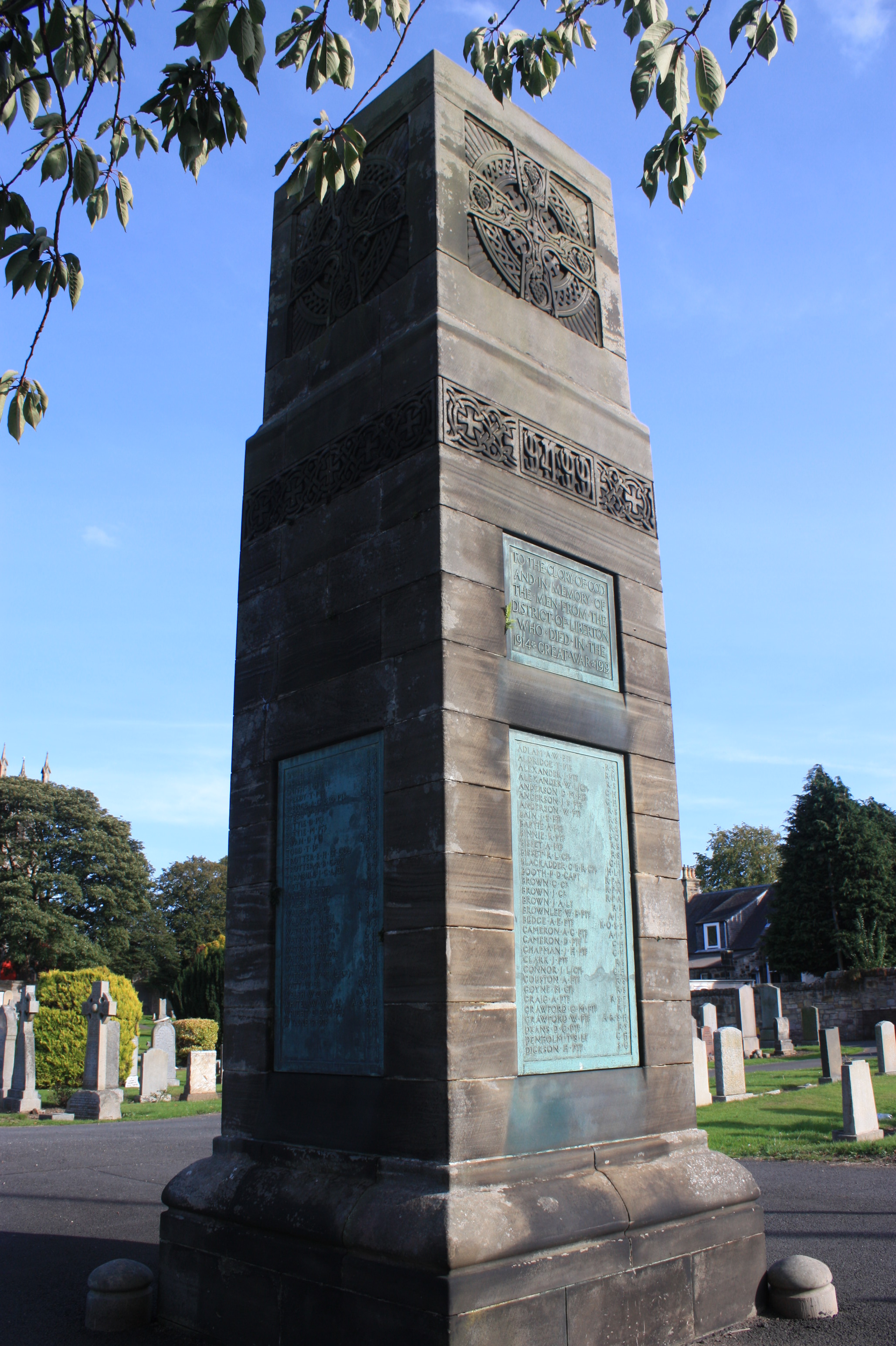
Liberton War Memorial, South Edinburgh

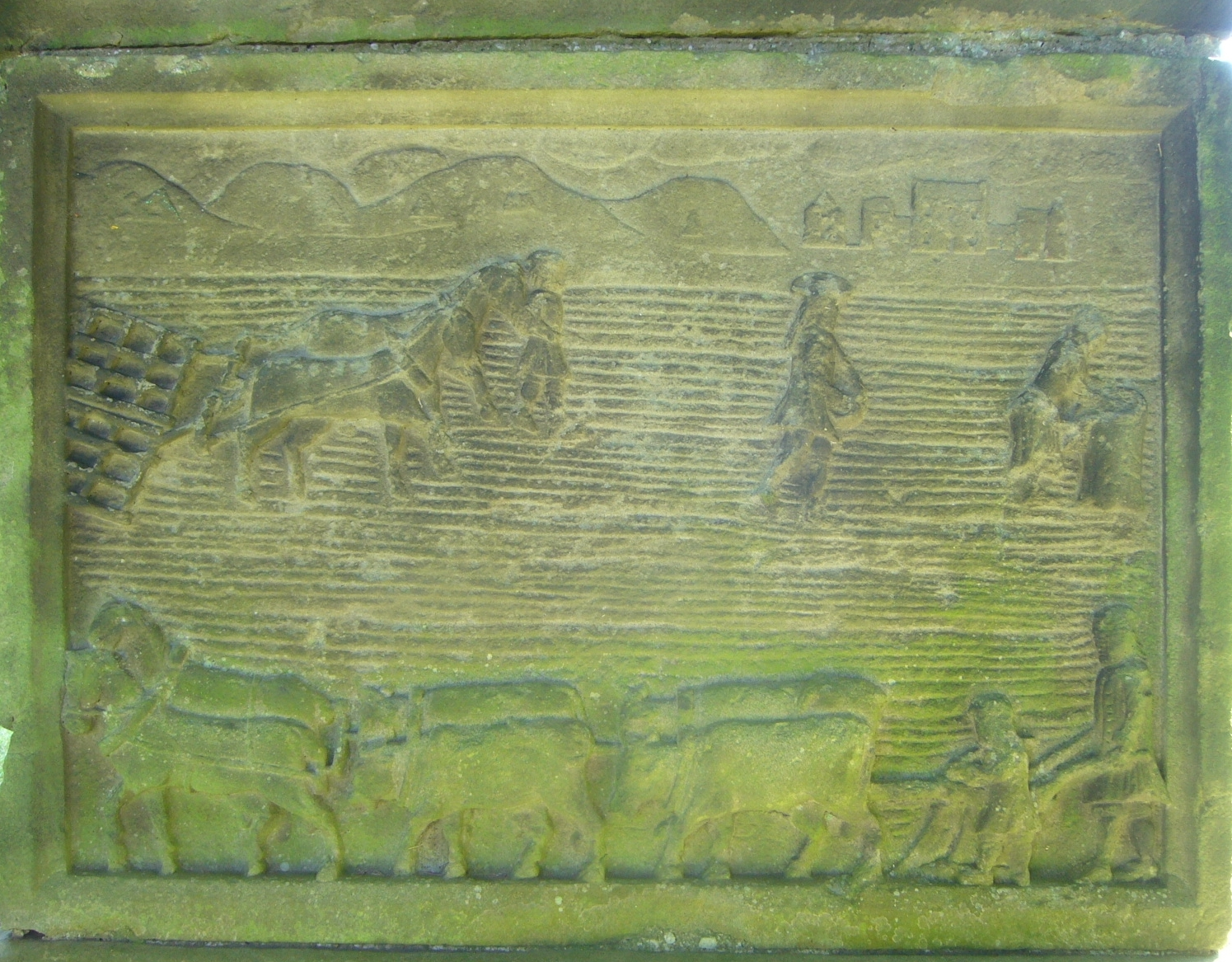
Ploughing scene on the Straiton tombstone

Liberton is a suburb of Edinburgh, Scotland. It is in the south of the city, south of The Inch, east of the Braid Hills and west of Moredun.

Liberton Community council's area includes Liberton, Gracemount, Kaimes, Alnwickhill and Mortonhall. Historically the parish covered a wide area and included Burdiehouse, Gilmerton, Niddrie and Straiton.

It was incorporated into the city in 1920..

== Derivation ==
The name, of Old English origin and formerly written Libertun, has generally been believed to signify 'Leper Town', the area being supposed at one time to have contained a small colony of lepers exiled from the city. However modern authorities have suggested it may more probably have meant ‘barley farm on a hillside’, from the Old English words hlith, hillside and bere-tūn, barley farm.

This rural parish was split into Over Liberton and Nether Liberton, the latter centring on a water mill standing on the Braid Burn.

== History ==
The suburb is home to a prehistoric standing stone just over 6-foot in height.

A chapel of Liberton was granted to the monks of Holyrood Abbey in 1143 by MacBeth, Baron of Liberton. The latter is mentioned in the Charters of King David I from 1124. In 1240 a document records the transfer of the church from St Cuthberts in Edinburgh back to Holyrood Abbey and this control continued until the Reformation.

In 1387 Nether Liberton was under control of Adam Forrester (whose family later owned Corstorphine) and is recorded (with Provost Andrew Yichtson) as benefactor of the repairs and rebuilding of St Giles Cathedral that year.

At the time of the Reformation a church, dedicated to the Virgin Mary, already existed at Liberton, under control of Holyrood Abbey. The Confederate Lords, who planned to seize Mary, Queen of Scots, and the Earl of Bothwell met at Liberton Kirk on 10 June 1567.

The current Liberton Church, designed by James Gillespie Graham, was built in 1815 after the old church was burned beyond repair. The graveyard contains a "table stone" to the south-west of the church bearing one of the earliest known sculpted depictions of ploughing. A modern cemetery lies to the north-west of the older kirkyard. The war memorial at the western entrance (1920) is by Pilkington Jackson.

Liberton Tower is a well-preserved and restored late medieval (15th century) tower house standing to the south of the Braid Hills. Liberton House nearby is a late 16th-century A-listed fortified house, also restored. The house is open to the public free of charge by appointment only.

Liberton became part of Edinburgh on 1 November 1920.

== Present-day Liberton ==
Although the area is mostly residential, it has a riding school and stables at Tower Farm, which also offers pony rides for children. Also in the area are Liberton High School, Gracemount High School and several primary schools (Liberton, St John Vianny, Gracemount and St Katherine's). Sports venues include Liberton Bowling Club, Liberton Golf Club and Liberton Rugby Football Club.

Ellen's Glen Community Hospital, which is managed by NHS Lothian, provides services for elderly and mentally ill patients. It is situated in the grounds of Southfield House, which was once the site of the Southfield Sanatorium. Liberton Hospital opened in 1906 and closd in 2025.

== Demographics ==
The Liberton/Gilmerton ward of the city had 37,672 inhabitants at the 2021 Census.

Ethnicity	Liberton/Gilmerton Ward	Edinburgh
White	82.6%	84.9%
Asian	10.2%	8.6%
Black	2.7%	2.1%
Mixed	2.4%	2.5%
Other	2.1%	1.9%

== Liberton Cemetery ==
Local family names include Speedy, Flockhart, Inch, Tod, Plenderleith, Borrowman and Torrance.

=== Monuments and interments ===
- Tom Aiken (1872–1943) Scottish snooker champion
- William Inglis Clark FRSE (1855–1932), chemist and mountaineer (stone vandalised)
- W. Barbrooke Grubb (1865-1930), missionary and author
- Arthur Robertson Cushny FRS (1866–1926), physiologist
- Henry John Dobson (1858–1928), artist from St John's Town of Dalry, Kirkcudbrightshire, father of artists Henry Raeburn Dobson and Cowan Dobson.
- Prof Robert Flint (1838–1910), theologian and philosopher
- Charles Edward Green (1866–1920), author of the Encyclopaedia of Agriculture
- A monument to the children who died at Dr Guthrie's School
- Rev George William Jones FRSE (1879–1918), academic, killed as a pilot in the First World War
- Rt Hon Sir John McNeill (1795–1883) and Lady Emma Augusta Campbell
- John McVeagh (d.1861), civil engineer
- Rev Joseph Moffett DD (1885–1962), theologian
- Charles Roy Nasmith FRSE (1882–1954) US consul
- Robert Payton Reid ARSA (1857–1945), artist
- Ethel Constance Roussel (d.1917), widow of the artist Arthur Melville (in the family plot of David Croall of Southfield)
- Lt John Thornton (1780–1870), participant in the Battle of Nivelle
- Prof Findlater Simpson (1842–1923), theologian

== Ministers of Liberton ==
Liberton was a relatively important rural charge.

- Alexander Forrester 1562 to 1566 formerly a Canon at Holyrood Abbey, probably the son or nephew of Alexander Forrester a Laird of Liberton in 1536
- Andrew Blackhall 1564 to 1567
- Thomas Cranstoun 1569 to 1570 and 1574 to 1579
- John Davidson 1579 to 1584
- Michael Cranstoun 1586 to 1590 translated to Cramond Kirk
- James Bennet 1591 to 1609
- John Adamson 1609 to 1623 became Principal of Edinburgh University
- John Cranstoun briefly in 1624 before translating back to South Leith Parish Church
- Andrew Learmonth 1627 to 1639
- Archibald Newton 1639 to 1657
- Andrew Cant 1659 to 1673 translated to Trinity College Church
- Ninian Paterson 1674 to 1683 deposed for "immorality"
- Robert Farquhar 1683 to 1687
- Alexander Cumin(g) 1687 to 1689
- James Webster 1689 to 1691
- Gideon Jacque 1692 to 1695
- Samuel Semple 1697 to 1742
- John Jardine 1741 to 1750 translated to Lady Yester's Church
- David Moubray 1751 briefly
- Thomas White 1751 to 1789
- James Grant MA 1789 to 1831
- William Purdie 1831 to 1834
- James Begg 1835 to 1843 from Lady Glenorchy's Church left at the Disruption of 1843 Moderator of the Free Church in 1865
- John Stewart 1843 to 1879 Father of the Church
- William Henry Gray 1880 to 1897 Moderator in 1888
- Robert Burnett 1898 to ?

== Other notable residents ==
- Robert Rowand Anderson (1834–1921), architect, was born in a cottage in Fernieside.
- Arthur Conan Doyle (1859–1930), author, lived in Liberton Bank House in the mid- to late-1860s while attending nearby Newington Academy. The house is now part of the Cameron Toll shopping centre.
- James Goodwillie FRSE (1866–1953) mathematician, born and raised in Liberton.
- Archie Scott (1918–2019), first-class cricketer
- Sam Latter (1904–2010), Scottish footballer and oldest man in Scotland from 2009 until his death at the age of 106, lived in Liberton Gardens for over 70 years.

== See also ==
- Liberton/Gilmerton (Edinburgh ward)
