= John Swinton, Lord Swinton =

Scottish lawyer, judge and writer (1723–1799)

The Hon John Swinton, Lord Swinton (1723–1799) was a Scottish lawyer, judge and writer who rose to be a Senator of the College of Justice.

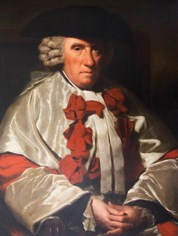
John Swinton, Lord Swinton, portrait by Henry Raeburn

== Life ==
He was the son of John Swinton of Swinton House in Berwickshire, advocate, and his wife Mary Semple, daughter of Rev Samuel Semple, minister of Liberton.

He was admitted advocate on 20 December, 1743, Appointed Sheriff of Perth in June 1754, in April 1766 he became solicitor for renewal of leases of the bishops' tithes, and solicitor and advocate to the commissioners for plantation of kirks in Scotland.

Swinton was elevated to the Scottish bench, with the title of Lord Swinton, on 21 December, 1782 replacing Alexander Lockhart, Lord Covington, and later, on the promotion of Lord Braxfield in 1788, was also made a lord of justiciary. At this time he had legal offices on Browns Square on the southern edge of Edinburgh. He also owned Dean House on the west side of Edinburgh.

Swinton House, his main country residence, burned down in 1797 and was not rebuilt until after his death.

He retained both appointments till his death, at his residence, Dean House, Edinburgh, on 5 January 1799.

== Works ==
Swinton published:

- Abridgment of the Public Statutes relative to Scotland, &c., from the Union to the 27th of George II, 2 vols. 1755; to the 29th of George III, 3 vols. 1788–90.
- Free Disquisition concerning the Law of Entails in Scotland, 1765.
- Proposal for Uniformity of Weights and Measures in Scotland, 1779.
- Considerations concerning a Proposal for dividing the Court of Session into Classes or Chambers; and for limiting Litigation in Small Causes, and for the Revival of Jury-trial in certain Civil Actions, 1789.

== Family ==
Swinton married Margaret, daughter of John Mitchelson of Middleton. They had six sons and seven daughters. His eldest son, also John Swinton and 28th of that Ilk, was Sheriff of Berwick from 1793 to 1809.

His fourth son, Lt Col Robert Swinton (1773-1821), is memorialised in St John's Churchyard on Princes Street in Edinburgh.

His last surviving son, George Swinton FRSE, served as Chief Secretary to the Bengal Civil Service and died in 1854, being buried in Dean Cemetery the site of old Dean House.

== Notes ==
Attribution

This article incorporates text from a publication now in the public domain: Lee, Sidney, ed. (1898). "Swinton, John". Dictionary of National Biography. Vol. 55. London: Smith, Elder & Co.
