= Belhaven =

Belhaven may refer to:

== Places ==
- Belhaven, Georgina, Ontario, Canada
- Belhaven, Scotland
- Belhaven, North Carolina, U.S.
- Alexandria, Virginia, U.S., originally called Belhaven
- Belhaven Neighborhood, in Jackson, Mississippi, U.S.

== Businesses and organisations ==
- Belhaven Brewery, in Belhaven, Scotland
- Belhaven Hospital, in Dunbar, Scotland
- Belhaven Press, an imprint of Pinter Publishers
- Belhaven University, in Jackson, Mississippi, U.S.

== See also ==
- Belle Haven (disambiguation)
- Lord Belhaven and Stenton, a title in the Peerage of Scotland
- Belhaven Hill School, Belhaven, Scotland
