= Leith Community Treatment Centre =

- NHS Lothian
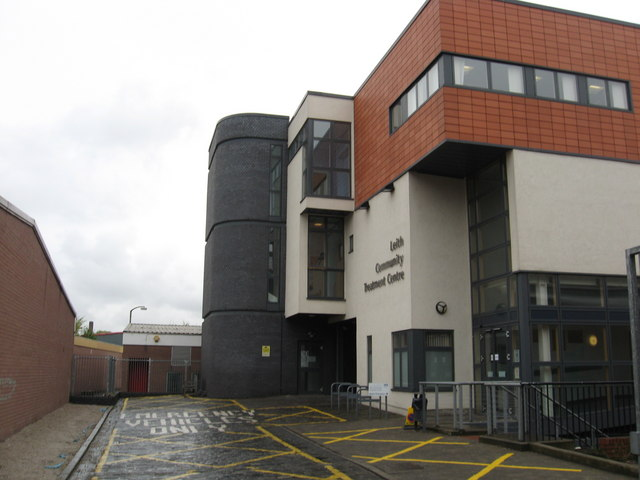
- Leith Community Treatment Centre

- Shown in Edinburgh

Geography
- Location: Edinburgh, Scotland
- Coordinates: 55°58′17″N 3°10′34″W

Organisation
- Care system: NHS Scotland
- Type: Specialist

Services
- Speciality: Community hospital

History
- Founded: 2004

Links
- Lists: Hospitals in Scotland
- Other links: List of hospitals in Scotland

The Leith Community Treatment Centre is a community hospital in Junction Place, Leith, Edinburgh, Scotland. It is managed by NHS Lothian.

== History ==
The centre replaced various outpatient services previously based at the Leith Hospital, Mill Lane Medical centre, the Eastern General Hospital and others, opened in June 2004 and cost £8.5 million. It was the first Community Treatment Centre of its kind in Scotland and provides services to children and adults living in the North East of Edinburgh and Leith. Consultants from Edinburgh hospitals such as the Western General, the Royal Infirmary and the Royal Hospital for Sick Children attend the centre regularly. Patients are referred here by hospital consultants or their local general practitioner.

Various community healthcare teams also use the centre as a base – for example social workers, midwives, community healthcare teams, school nurses psychiatric nurses, paediatric speech and language therapists.

The centre won an award in October 2014 for introducing a more patient-friendly endoscopy service, which requires no sedation or aftercare.

In December 2016 Deputy Health Minister Lewis Macdonald described the centre as "an excellent model for how a community hospital can work in an urban setting to provide a range of health and social care services".
