= Samuel Semple =

Samuel Semple (1666–1742) was a Church of Scotland minister and historian.

== Life ==
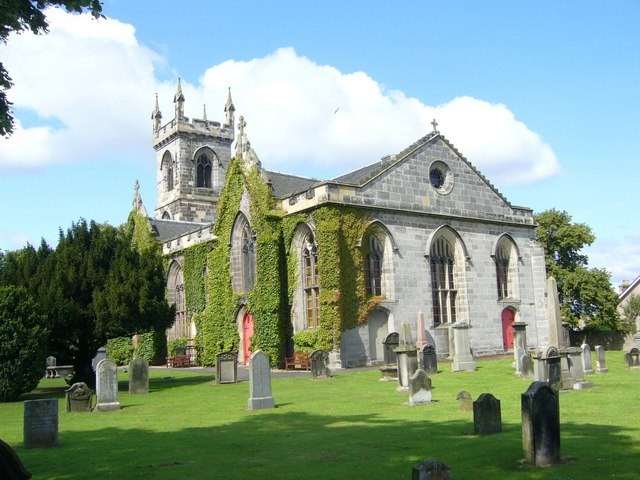
Liberton Kirk in south Edinburgh

Semple was born in 1666 as the son of Gabriel Semple (1632–1706), minister of Jedburgh, and his wife Margaret Murray, daughter of Sir Patrick Murray of Glendoick and Blackcastle.

He studied at Edinburgh University graduating MA in July 1693. In August 1697, he was ordained as minister of Liberton Parish Church, south of Edinburgh.

He died in Liberton manse on 7 January 1742, and was buried in the graveyard of his own church.

== Family ==
In 1701, Semple married Elizabeth Murray, daughter of Sir Archibald Murray of Blackbarony near Peebles. Their children included:

- Mary (1703–1768) who married John Swinton of Swinton House and were parents to John Swinton, Lord Swinton.
- William Semple (b.1705)
- Elizabeth (b.1710)

His wife died at Swinton House on 18 January 1748.

== Publications ==
- History of the Christian Religion from its First Plantation in Scotland
