= Southfield Sanatorium =

Historic hospital in Liberton, Edinburgh

Coordinates: 55.9092°N 3.1504°W

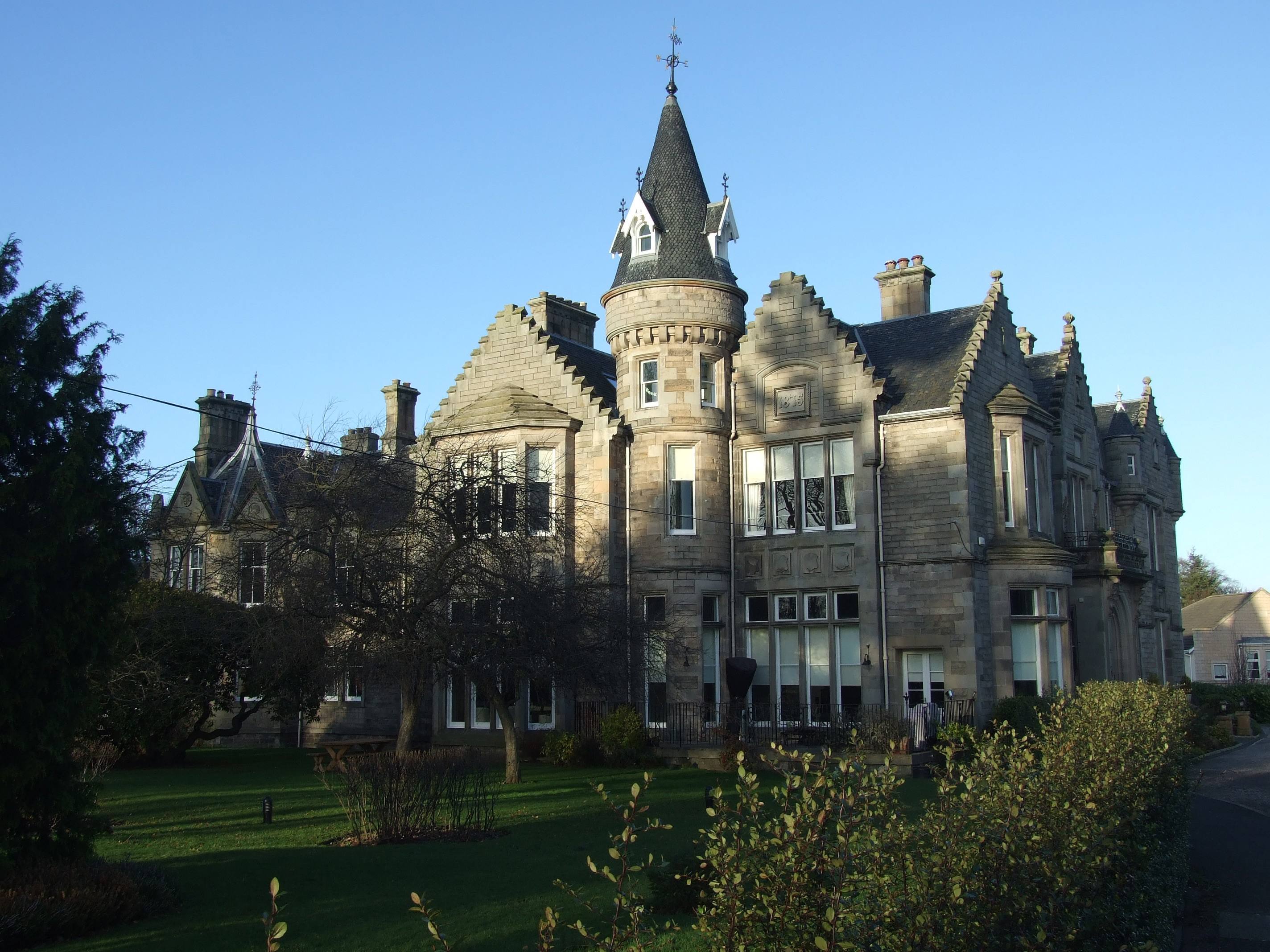
Southfield House, previously a sanatorium, in Liberton, Edinburgh.

Southfield Sanatorium was a specialist historic hospital in Liberton, Edinburgh, Scotland, situated near Ellen's Glen nature reserve. The house was redeveloped to provide private residences, new housing was built in the grounds and a purpose-built health facility opened at Ellen's Glen in 2000.

== History ==
Southfield is noted in the Ordnance Survey name books for Midlothian as the country seat of John Croall in the 1850s.

Southfield House (1875) was designed by Scottish architect John Chesser (1819–92) in the Scottish baronial style for coachbuilder John Croall to replace a previous house. The sandstone building, with its French Gothic detailing, was category B listed in 1996.

Southfield was converted to a tuberculosis sanatorium in 1902 and became part of the Royal Victoria Hospital in the 1920s. Plans of the original house and later alterations by Dick Peddie and MacKay are held by Historic Environment Scotland and can be viewed via Canmore.

Case notes for patients treated in Southfield Sanatorium are held by the Lothian Health Services Archive at the University of Edinburgh. The records show most patients stayed for a period of several months of treatment for forms of tuberculosis.
