= Ferryfield House =

- NHS Lothian
- Ferryfield House in 2026

- Shown in Edinburgh

Geography
- Location: Pilton, Edinburgh, Scotland
- Coordinates: 55°58′13″N 3°13′48″W

Organisation
- Care system: NHS Scotland
- Type: Community Hospital

Services
- Emergency department: No
- Beds: 60

Helipads
- Helipad: No

History
- Founded: October 1996

Links
- Lists: Hospitals in Scotland

Ferryfield House is a community hospital in Pilton, Edinburgh, Scotland. It is managed by NHS Lothian.

== History ==
The hospital has its origins in the Leith Public Hospital which was designed by James Simpson and opened in 1896. The facility was subsequently renamed the Northern General Hospital.

A new hospital, which was commissioned to replace the Northern General Hospital, was procured under a Private Finance Initiative ('PFI') contract in 1993, the first hospital project in Scotland to use this form of procurement. The site had previously been part of City Park, the first home of Livingston F.C. The new hospital was built by James Walker (Leith) Limited at a cost of £2 million and opened in October 1996.

== Services ==
Ferryfield House is a 60-bed unit that specialises in short-term and respite care. There are two wards, with one used to treat patients with "dementia and challenging behaviour" and the other for the frail and elderly.
