= East Lothian Community Hospital =

- NHS Lothian
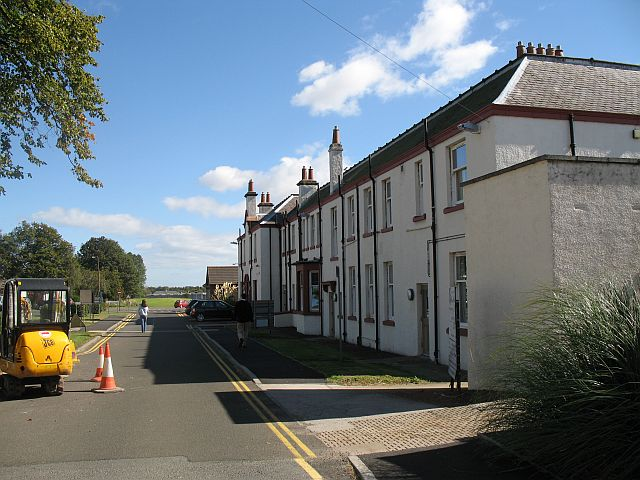
- The old Roodlands General Hospital

- Shown in East Lothian

Geography
- Location: East Lothian, Scotland
- Coordinates: 55°57′25″N 2°47′52″W

Organisation
- Care system: NHS Scotland
- Type: General Hospital

Services
- Emergency department: No

Links
- Website: www.nhslothian.scot/goingtohospital/east-lothian-community-hospital/
- Lists: Hospitals in Scotland

East Lothian Community Hospital is a hospital located on Station Road, Haddington, East Lothian, Scotland. The hospital is operated by NHS Lothian.

== History ==
The Roodlands General Hospital was built as an infectious diseases hospital for the local area and opened around 1906. It became the County Infectious Diseases Hospital in 1930 and joined the National Health Service as Roodlands General Hospital in 1948.

A major redevelopment of the site to create a modern community hospital, known as East Lothian Community Hospital, was undertaken by Morrison Construction at a cost of £70 million, starting in January 2017. The new East Lothian Community Hospital opened in October 2020.
