= Tippethill House Hospital =

- NHS Lothian
- Shown in West Lothian

Geography
- Location: Armadale, West Lothian, Scotland
- Coordinates: 55°52′35″N 3°41′15″W

Organisation
- Care system: NHS Scotland
- Type: Community hospital

History
- Founded: 1901

Links
- Lists: Hospitals in Scotland

Tippethill House Hospital is a community hospital in Armadale, West Lothian, Scotland. It is operated by NHS Lothian.

== History ==
The facility has its origins in the Tippethill Hospital which opened as an infectious diseases hospital in 1901. It was expanded by the addition of two new blocks in 1937. A new hospital, which was procured under a Private Finance Initiative contract in 1999, was built at a cost of £2.3 million and opened in 2001.

== Services ==
The hospital is a 60-bed hospital specialising in short term and respite care: it is split into two wards: Bailie Wing specialising in medical care and respite, and Rosebery Wing which deals with mental health care.
