= Edington Cottage Hospital =

- NHS Lothian
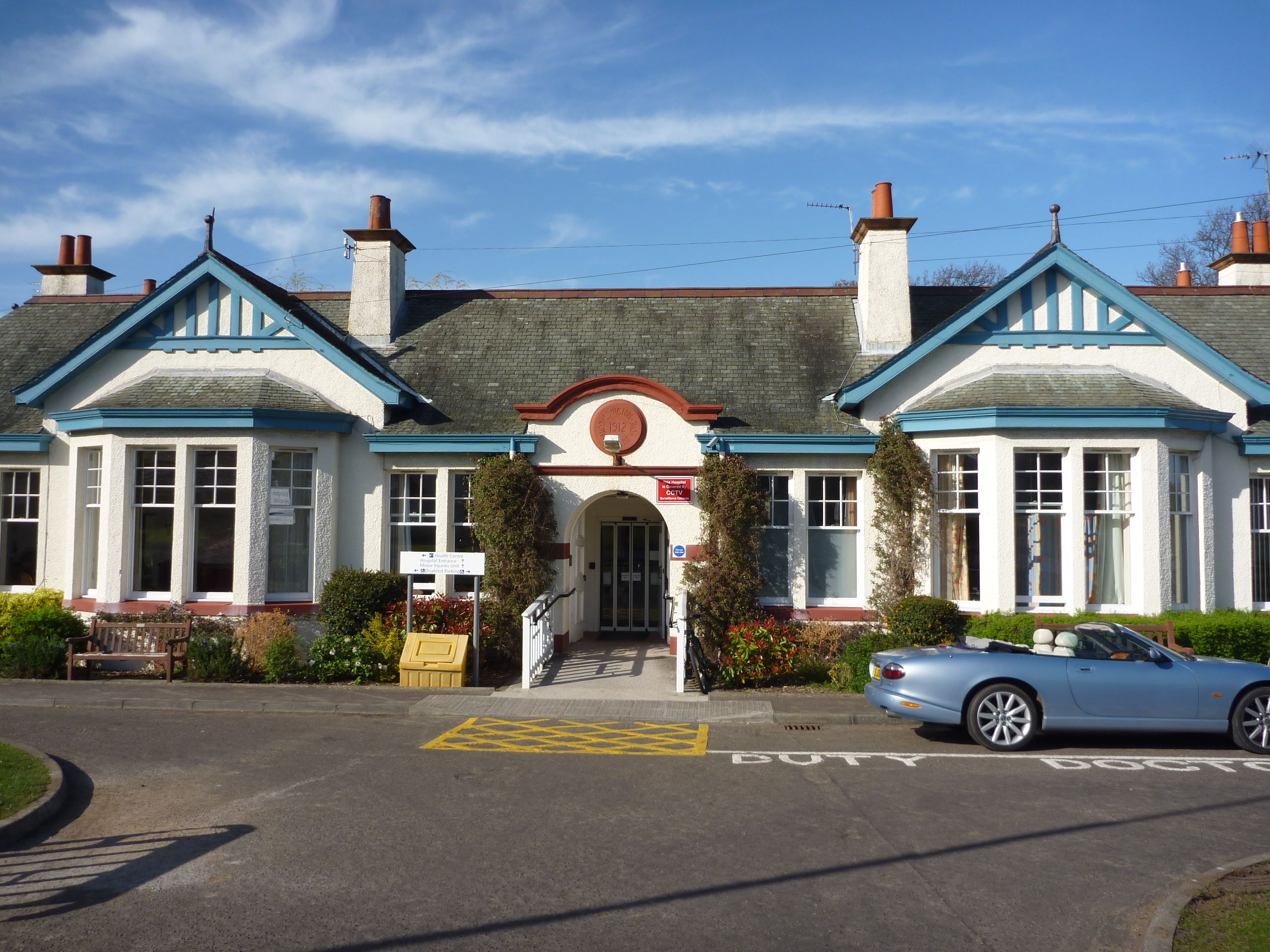
- Edington Cottage Hospital

- Shown in East Lothian

Geography
- Location: North Berwick, East Lothian, Scotland, United Kingdom
- Coordinates: 56.0553°N 2.7185°W

Organisation
- Care system: NHS Scotland
- Type: Cottage Hospital

Services
- Emergency department: No Accident & Emergency

Links
- Website: www.nhslothian.scot.nhs.uk/GoingToHospital/Locations/Pages/EdingtonCottageHospital.aspx
- Lists: Hospitals in Scotland

Edington Cottage Hospital is a hospital located in 54 St Baldred's Road, North Berwick, East Lothian. It is managed by NHS Lothian.

== History ==
The hospital was founded by Elizabeth Edington (1831–1908), who bequeathed 10,000 pounds to found the hospital. Originally opened as Edington Home in October 1913, it was subsequently known as 'The Home of Tired Mothers'. It joined the National Health Service as Edington Cottage Hospital in 1948.

== Services ==
Amongst other services, Edington Cottage Hospital has a minor injuries unit and GP beds for the frail elderly.
