= Charles Roy Nasmith =

American diplomat

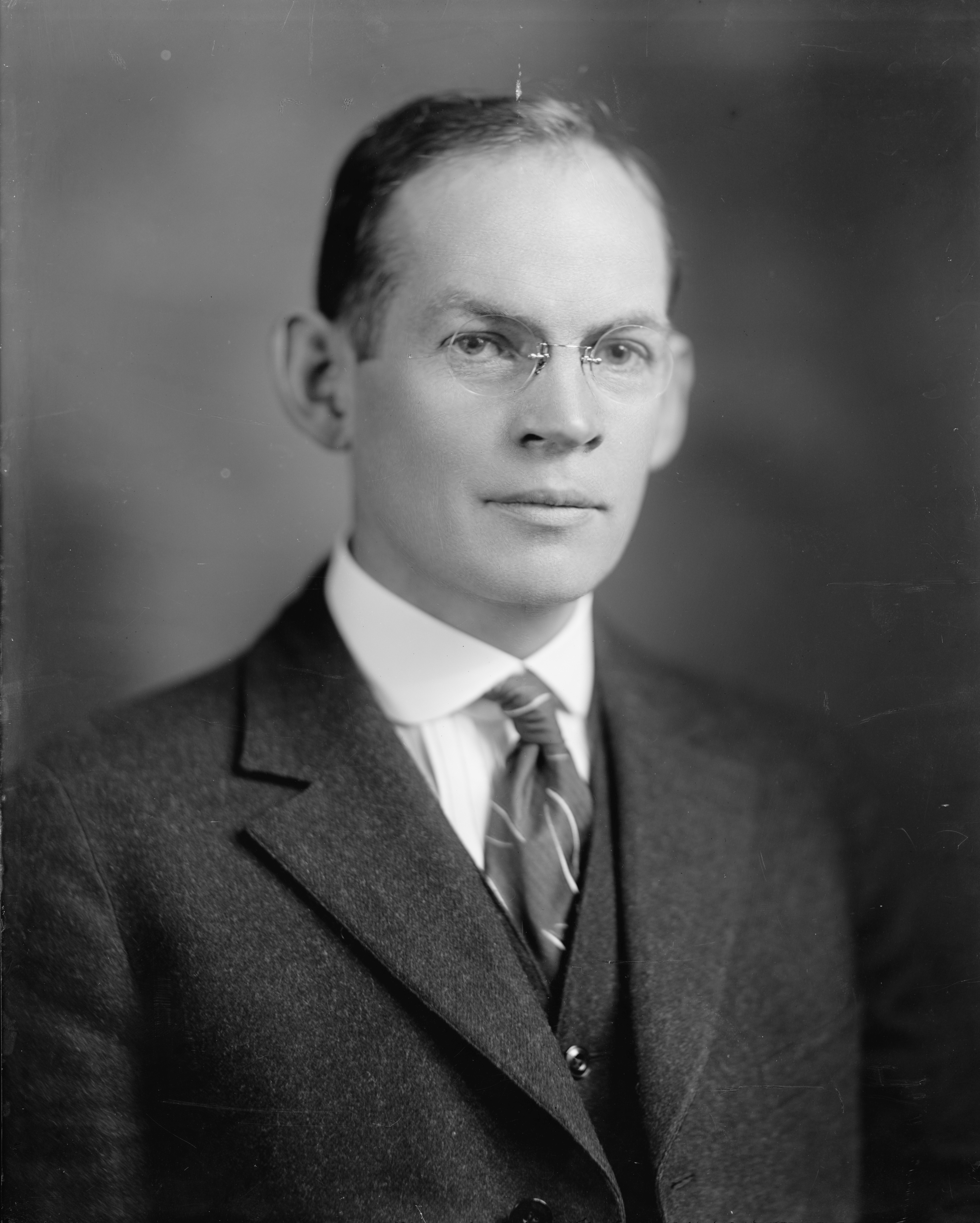
Charles Roy Nasmith

Charles Roy Nasmith FRSE (1882–1954) was an American diplomat who served as the US Consul in Belgium and Scotland.

== Life ==
He was born in Mannsville, New York, on 18 July 1882 to Jared Spalding Nasmith and his wife Flora Sarah Wake.

He studied at Colgate University graduating BA in 1904 then joining the Diplomatic Service in 1907 before gaining a further MA in 1916.

Serving with the US Consul he served in Limoges 1907 to 1911, Brussels from 1911 to 1917 (through critical war years), moving to Rotterdam when America entered the war he returned to Belgium in 1919, serving in Ghent until 1922. After another return to the US he went to Britain in 1926 to Newcastle-upon-Tyne then to Porto Alegre in Brazil until 1929. After another return to US he went to Marseille in the south of France in 1932 before going to Edinburgh where he then settled.

In 1937 he was elected a Fellow of the Royal Society of Edinburgh. His proposers were James Pickering Kendall, Thomas James Jehu, George Freeland Barbour Simpson and Ernest Wedderburn.

He retired in 1946 and died in Edinburgh on 5 December 1954 and is buried in Liberton Cemetery in the south of the city.

== Family ==
In June 1915 he married Evelyn Mary (Liline) Kirkpatrick (1893-1975) whom he had met working in Brussels. They married around 1920. She moved to Peeblesshire after his death. They had one daughter Annette Evelyn Nasmith (1923-2004) born in Ghent.
