= Arthur Robertson Cushny =

Scottish pharmacologist and physiologist (1866–1926)

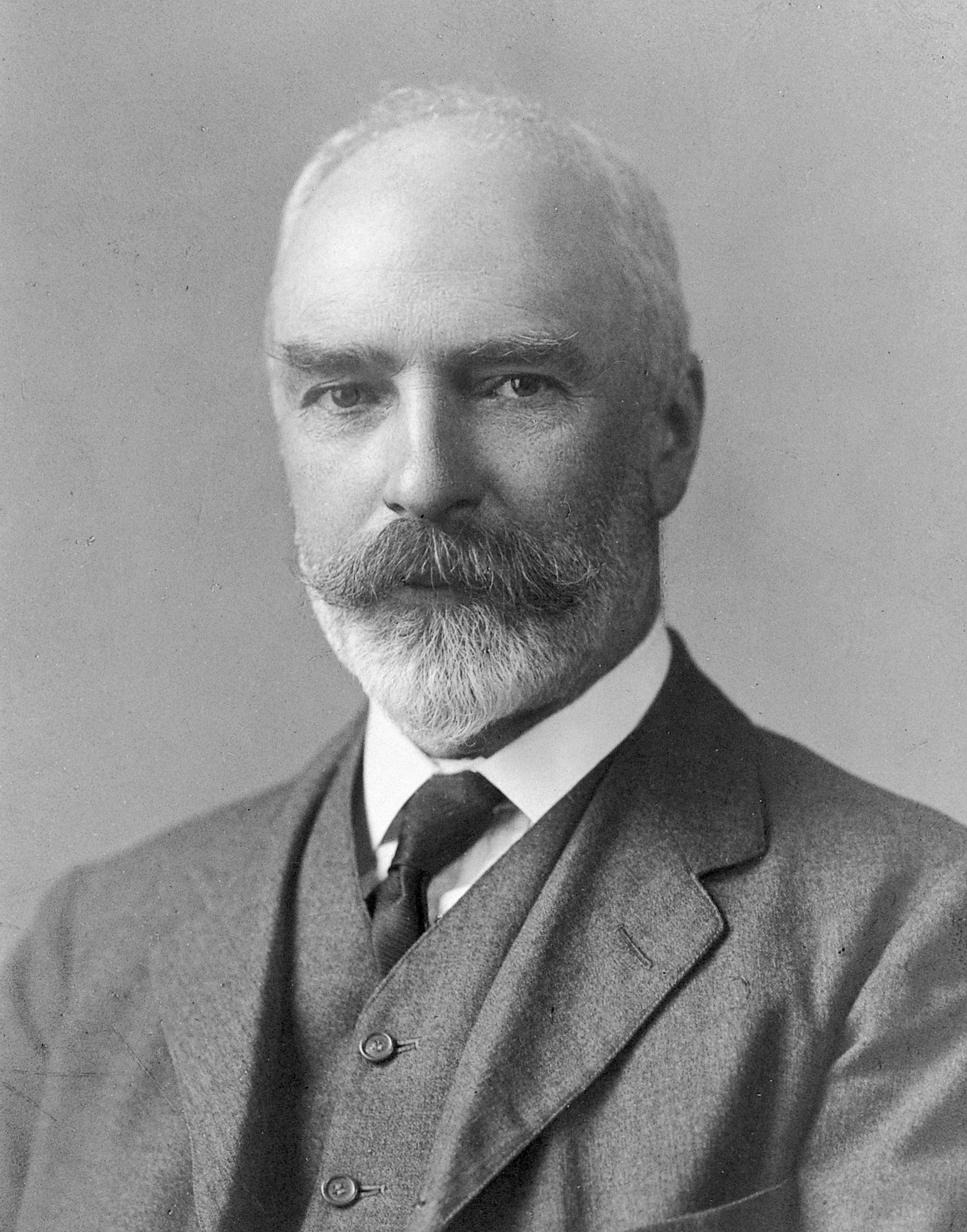

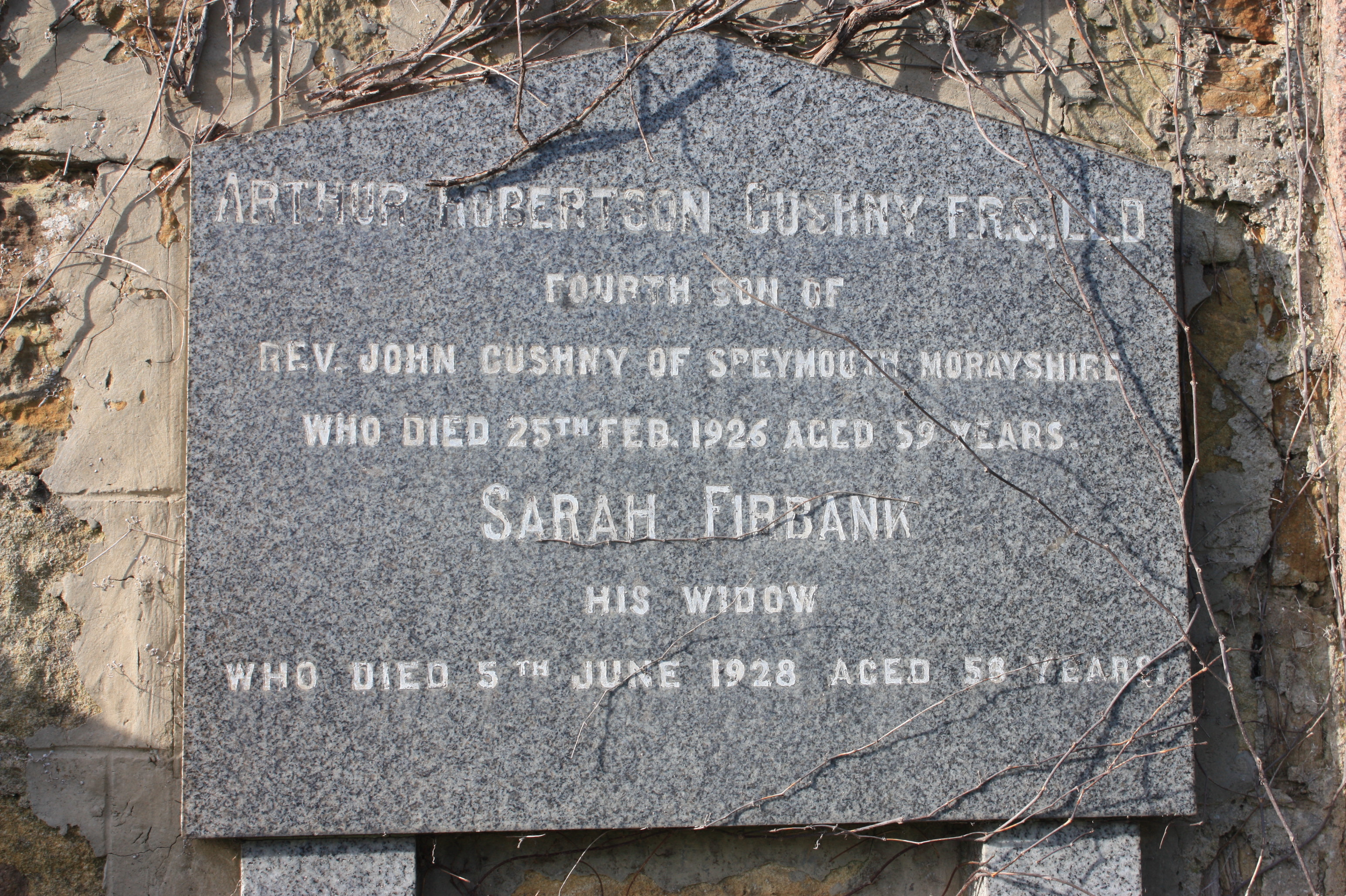
The grave of Arthur Robertson Cushny, Liberton Cemetery, Edinburgh

Arthur Robertson Cushny FRS FRSE LLD (6 March 1866 – 25 February 1926), was a Scottish pharmacologist and physiologist who became a Fellow of the Royal Society.

== Life ==
Cushny was born on 6 March 1866 in Fochabers, Moray, Scotland, the fourth son of Rev John Cushny of Speymouth and his wife, Catherine Ogilvie Brown.

He attended a local rural school until he enrolled at the University of Aberdeen and received an M.A. in 1886. Then in 1889, he graduated from medical studies at Marischal College, Aberdeen, receiving C.M., M.B. and M.D. degrees in 1892.

Aroused by interests of physiological drug interaction, he traveled to the European continent and spent a year of associated study under Oswald Schmiedeberg at Straßburg, German Empire and six months in Bern under Hugo Kronecker, from whom he learned elements of physiological technique.

Then in 1893, at age 27, he accepted the chairmanship of pharmacology at the University of Michigan, replacing the newly resigned Professor J. J. Abel. While there he taught, conducted research and wrote his Text-Book of Pharmacology and Therapeutics, an unrivaled book for thirty years with a posthumous edition published in 1928.

Cushny's contributions to the field of pharmacology were considerable. He performed, with the most modern techniques of the time, the first experimental analysis of the action of digitalis on warm-blooded animals and explained its effects, thereby increasing the drug's therapeutic use and value. He was the first to understand the similarity between clinical and experimental auricular fibrillation.

He was also interested for several years in the physiological action of optical isomers and, in c. 1900, the mechanisms of kidney secretion, providing three advanced papers on the subject between 1901 and 1904 in the Journal of Physiology. In 1917, he presented the paper, The Secretion of Urine, an advancement of the "modern theory" of kidney secretion, and also wrote a second edition of it released posthumously. Here he laid aside the theories of the inexplicable vital activities of the kidneys. He claimed that their primary structures, the glomeruli, simply filter out harmful bodily waste products while useful nutrients are reabsorbed into the body in the renal tubules.

In 1905, he accepted the chair of pharmacology at University College London (UCL), and then in 1918, replaced the chair vacated by Sir Thomas Fraser in Edinburgh, where remained until his death.

In 1907, he was elected a Fellow of the Royal Society of London. In 1919, he was elected a Fellow of the Royal Society of Edinburgh, his proposers being Sir Edward Albert Sharpey-Schafer, Sir James Walker, John Horne, and Arthur Robinson.

Whilst in Edinburgh, he bought a historic manor house, the "Dumbiedykes" of the Heart of Midlothian, that he retired to when entertaining international medical students and physicians. He was an avid horticulturalist, spending more and more time in his garden. He married Sarah Firbank (1870-1928) in 1896.

He died of a sudden apoplectic stroke at his home in Edinburgh, Scotland on 25 February 1926.

He is buried in Liberton Cemetery in south Edinburgh. The grave lies against the north wall of the southern cemetery (backing onto the more modern extension).

== Notable monographic works ==
- The Action and Uses in Medicine of Digitalis and Its Allies (1925)
- The Biological Relation of Optically Isometric Substances (1926)
- The Secretion of Urine (1917)
