= Eastern General Hospital =

- NHS Lothian
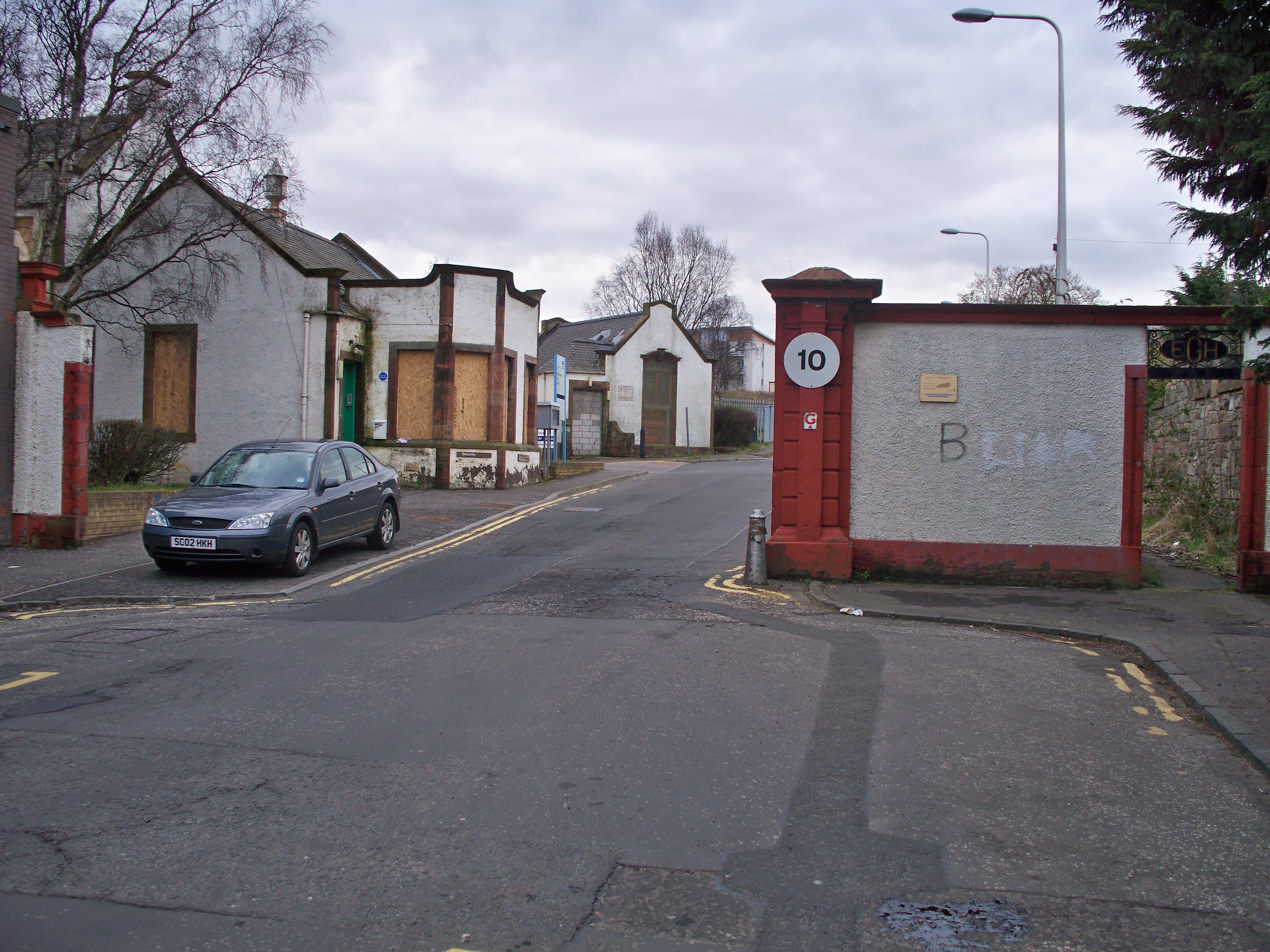
- Eastern General Hospital

- Shown in Edinburgh

Geography
- Location: Edinburgh, Scotland
- Coordinates: 55.9685°N 3.1463°W

Organisation
- Care system: NHS Scotland

Services
- Emergency department: No

History
- Founded: 1907
- Closed: 2007

Links
- Lists: Hospitals in Scotland

The Eastern General Hospital was a health facility in Seafield Street in Leith, Edinburgh, Scotland. It was managed by NHS Lothian at its time of closure and prior to that was managed by Lothian Health Board.

== History ==
The hospital was designed by Joseph Marr Johnston and was established in 1907 by Leith Parish Council as the Leith Poorhouse. This replaced both South Leith Poorhouse on Great Junction Street and North Leith Poorhouse on North Junction Street.

Although it was built in two sections, a poorhouse section and a hospital section, some sources claim that the poorhouse section was almost immediately converted for medical use. However, this is later contradicted as when the hospital section was requisitioned for military use during the First World War local newspapers state that the 200 soldiers under care were within the broader boundary of the poorhouse, whose function still continued.

An operating theatre and accommodation for nurses was added at this point. In 1931, plans were approved for conversion to a hospital. It joined the National Health Service in 1948 and developed considerable expertise in prosthetics before closing in 2007.
