= Ellen's Glen House =

- NHS Lothian
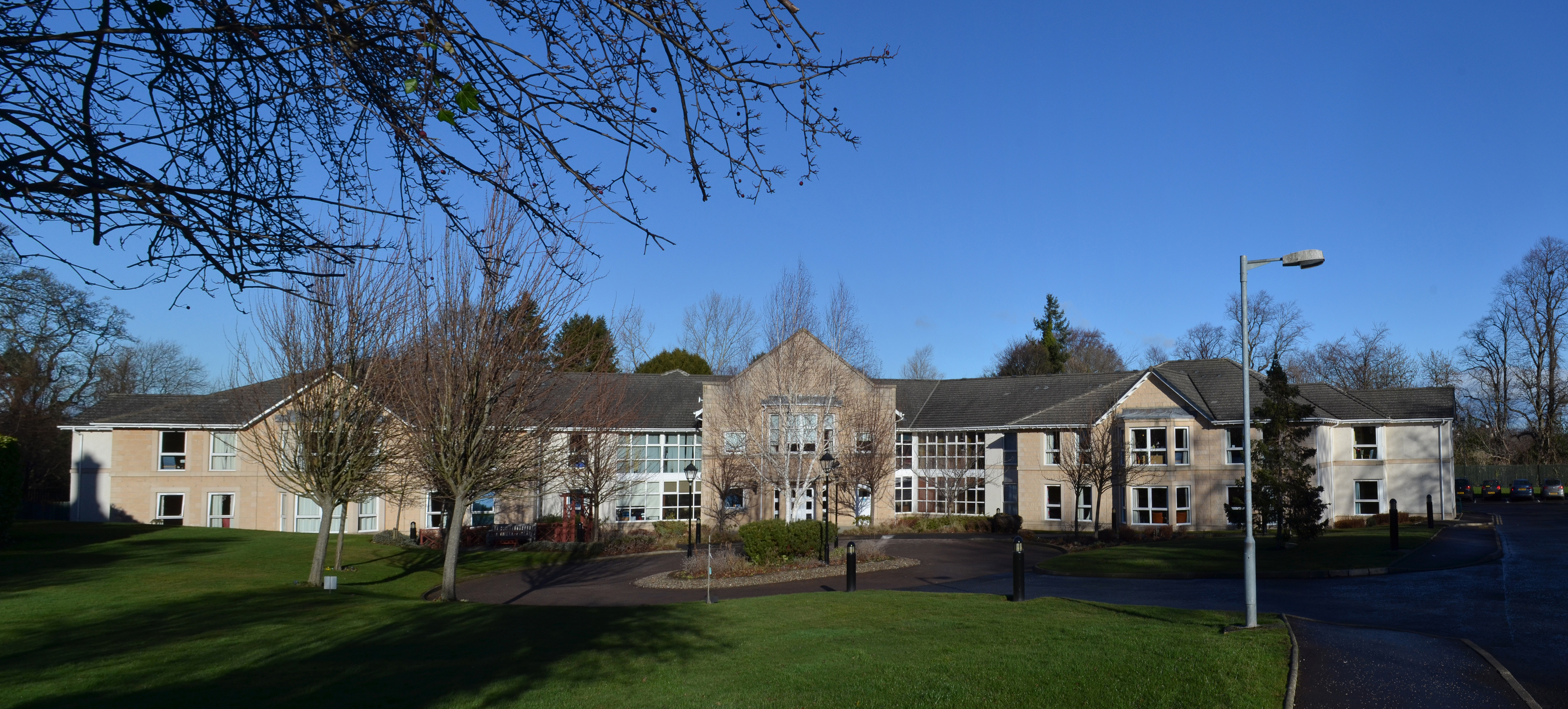
- Ellen's Glen House

- Shown in Edinburgh

Geography
- Location: Liberton, Edinburgh, Scotland
- Coordinates: 55°54′34″N 3°08′59″W

Organisation
- Care system: NHS Scotland
- Type: Community Hospital

Services
- Emergency department: No
- Beds: Was 60; 27->9.

Helipads
- Helipad: No

History
- Founded: November 1999

Links
- Lists: Hospitals in Scotland

Ellen's Glen Community Hospital, originally Ellen's Glen House, is a community-based hospital which was built to provide services to elderly and mentally ill patients in Liberton, Edinburgh, Scotland. It is managed by NHS Lothian. In 2025, as result of the closure of the neighbouring Liberton Hospital, the medical day hospital moved from Liberton to Ellen's Glen. The hospital provides intermediate care and outpatients services, plus a small number of Hospital Based Complex Clinical Care (HBCCC) beds. It is also a base for the hospital-at-home service (a multidisciplinary acute care team).

== History ==
The hospital has its origins in Southfield House, a building situated near Ellen's Glen nature reserve, which was designed by John Chesser in the Scottish baronial style. It opened as a tuberculosis sanatorium in 1875 and became part of the Royal Victoria Hospital in the 1920s. Plans of the original house, and later alterations by Dick, Peddie and MacKay, are held by Historic Environment Scotland and viewed via trove.scot.

A new hospital, commissioned to replace the Southfield House facility, was procured under a Private Finance Initiative contract in February 1999. It was built by James Walker (Leith) Limited just to the north of Southfield House at a cost of £2.65 million and opened as Ellen's Glen House from January 2000.

== Services ==
Prior to 2026, the hospital provided services to elderly and mentally ill patients in a two-floor building with 60 staffed beds set in extensive accessible gardens. The services included frail adult complex clinical care and palliative care; according to inspection reports stays range from a few weeks to a number of years.

When the neighbouring Liberton Hospital closed at the end of 2025, the Hospital at Home and Medical Day hospital was relocated to Ellen's Glen Hospital. A reduction in frail elderly inpatient bed numbers from 27 to nine took place. Frail elderly patients have been transitioned to community settings (hospices, care homes and their own homes) in line with the strategic vision for health and social care. Thistle ward psychiatric patients were moved to other Lothian NHS clinical care facilities.

Currently, Ellen's Glen is a base for the Hospital at Home service providing acute, hospital-level care by healthcare professionals in a home context for a condition that would otherwise require acute hospital inpatient care. The hospital also provides intermediate care, complex clinical care and outpatients services.
