= Belle Haven =

Belle Haven may refer to:

== Places in the United States ==
- Belle Haven, Fairfax County, Virginia
- Belle Haven, Accomack County, Virginia
- Belle Haven, Menlo Park, California
- Belle Haven, Greenwich, Connecticut

== Other uses ==
- Belle Haven Consultants, a former Hong Kong–based organization

== See also ==
- Belhaven (disambiguation)
