= Belhaven Hospital =

Community hospital in Beveridge Row, Dunbar, East Lothian

- NHS Lothian
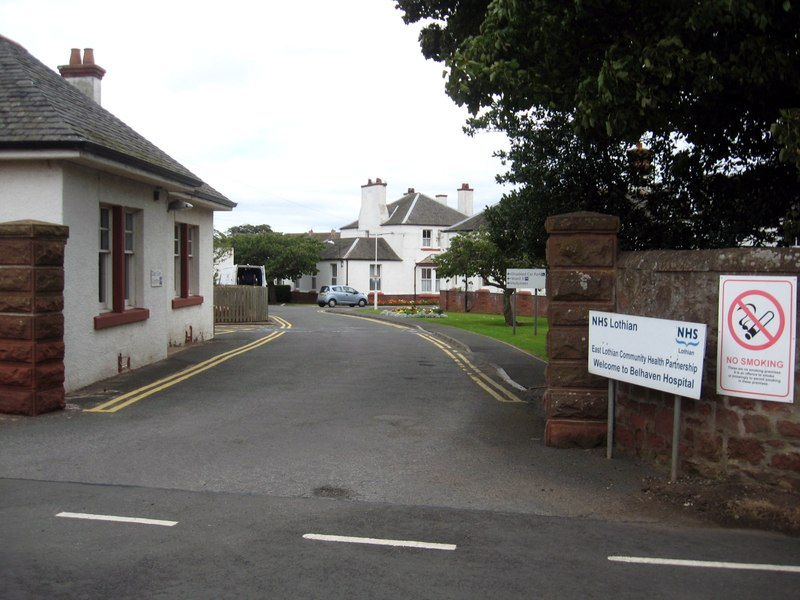
- Entrance to Belhaven Hospital

- Shown in East Lothian

Geography
- Location: East Lothian, Scotland
- Coordinates: 55.9955°N 2.5378°W

Organisation
- Care system: NHS Scotland
- Type: Community Hospital

Services
- Emergency department: No

Links
- Website: Website
- Lists: Hospitals in Scotland

Belhaven Hospital is a community hospital in Beveridge Row, Dunbar, East Lothian. The hospital is managed by NHS Lothian.

== History ==
The hospital was designed by Sydney Mitchell and George Wilson and built as an infectious diseases facility between 1903 and 1904. An emergency operating theatre was added during the Second World War and the hospital joined the National Health Service in 1948. In January 2018 the hospital board announced that ward 2 would be closed for clinical use.

== Services ==
The hospital provides continuing care and GP beds for the frail and elderly.
