= Robert Payton Reid =

Scottish painter (1859–1945)

Robert Payton Reid A.R.S.A. (1859 – 1945) was a Scottish academic painter.

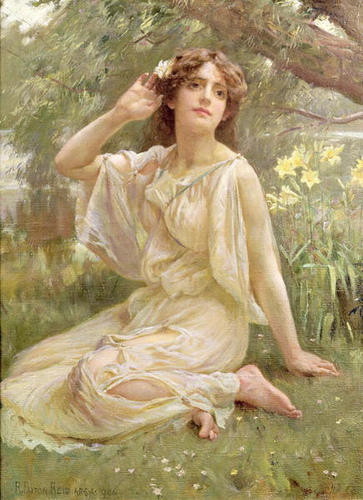
Echo

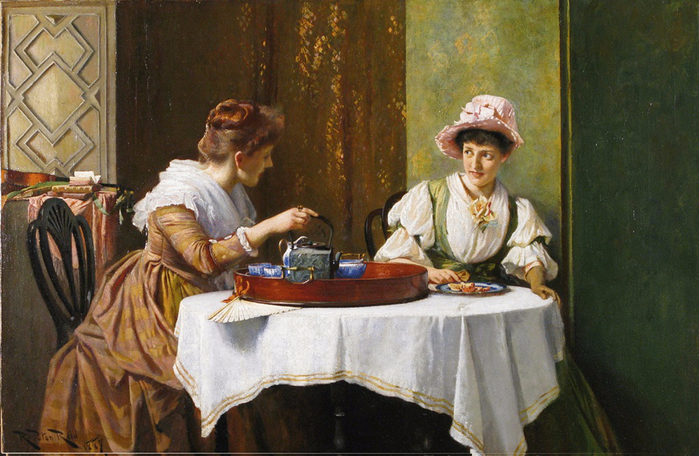
Little Tea and Gossip

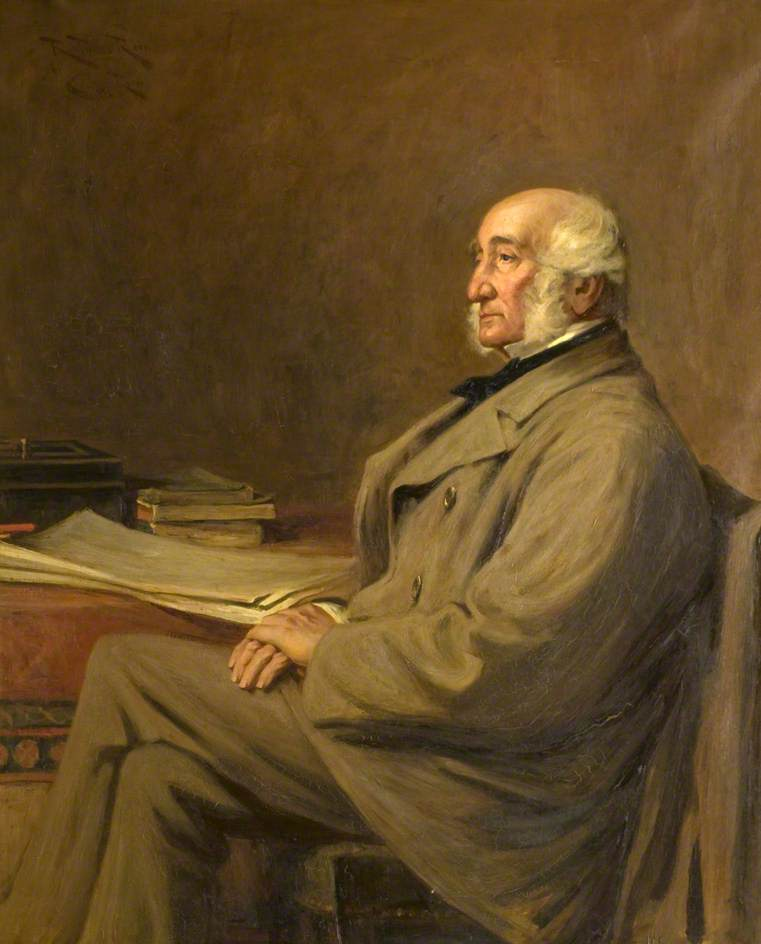
Sir John Ogilvy

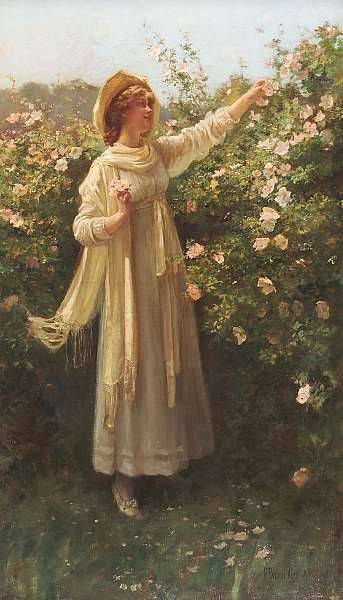
Sweet briar

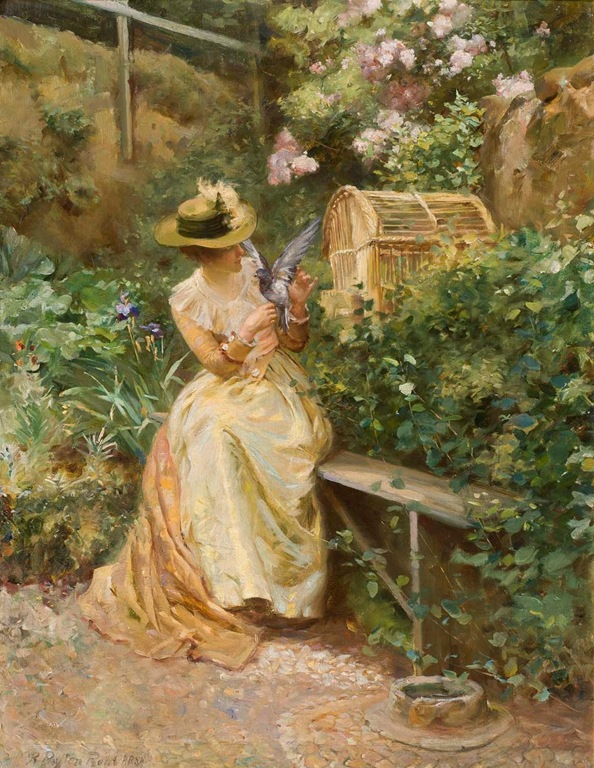
The Pet Dove
