= Liberton Hospital =

- NHS Lothian
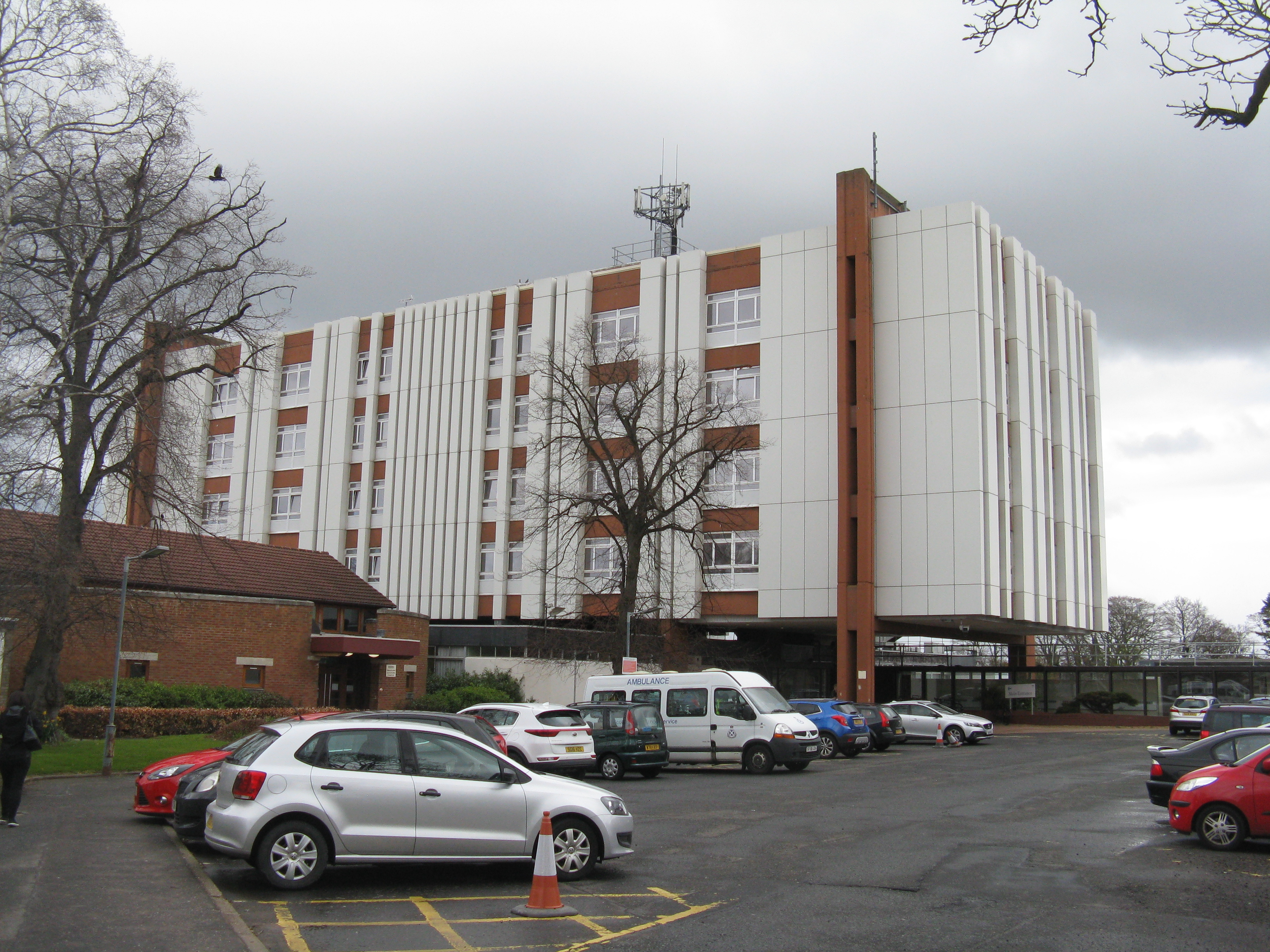
- Liberton Hospital

- Shown in Edinburgh

Geography
- Location: Edinburgh, Scotland
- Coordinates: 55.9087°N 3.1542°W

Organisation
- Care system: NHS Scotland
- Type: Geriatric medicine

History
- Founded: 1906
- Closed: 2025

Links
- Website: www.nhslothian.scot.nhs.uk/GoingToHospital/Locations/Pages/LibertonHospital.aspx
- Lists: Hospitals in Scotland
- Other links: List of hospitals in Scotland

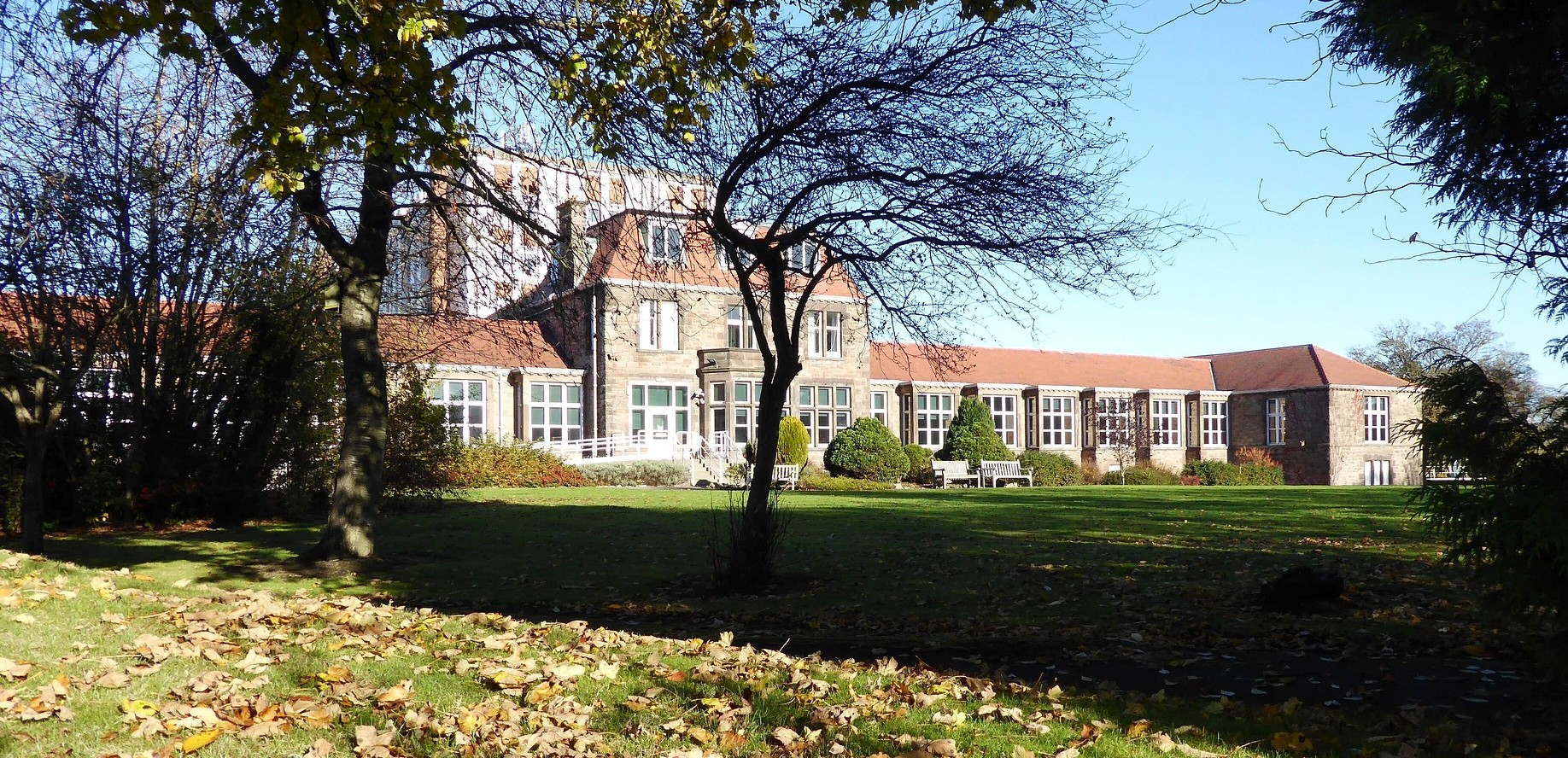
Main hospital building constructed for the Royal Edinburgh Association for Incurables, designed by architects Dick Peddie and George Washington Browne and completed in 1906

Liberton Hospital was a facility for geriatric medicine on Lasswade Road in Edinburgh, Scotland. It was managed by NHS Lothian. It closed at the end of December 2025. Intermediate care and outpatient services are now based at Ellen's Glen Community Hospital.

== History ==
The hospital was designed by John Dick Peddie and George Washington Browne and opened in 1906.

Liberton operated in partnership with the Longmore Hospital and the two hospitals together became known as the Royal Edinburgh Hospital for Incurables. The hospital joined the National Health Service in 1948 and a new four‑storey geriatric facility was built on the site in 1963.

=== Redevelopment plans ===
In 2014, the health board considered proposals to demolish the hospital and three others, with a view to replacing these facilities with care villages which would consist of buildings more suited to social care.

In April 2023 it was announced that Edinburgh Council had bought the hospital site and grounds from NHS Lothian for £14.8m. The deal includes the former Blood Transfusion Centre. The council plans to build around 400 homes, a number of which will be accessible and for social or mid-market rent. The 1960s buildings are to be demolished and original Edwardian-era buildings redeveloped. The aim is to create an accessible neighbourhood of low-carbon housing.

Originally the NHS was to occupy the premises until March 2025 to allow the hospital’s remaining services to be relocated. However, the hospital-at-home team and the Medical Day Hospital were relocated to Ellen's Glen Hospital at the end of 2025. The number of complex care beds have been reduced in line with the Edinburgh Integration Joint Board strategic vision.
