= NHS Lothian =

One of 14 regions of NHS Scotland

- Type: NHS board
- Established: 2001
- Headquarters: Mainpoint; 102 Westport; Edinburgh; EH3 9DN
- Region served: East Lothian; Edinburgh; Midlothian; West Lothian
- Population: 897,770
- Staff: 21,921 (2019/20)
- Website: www.nhslothian.scot

NHS Lothian is one of the 14 regions of NHS Scotland. It provides healthcare services in the City of Edinburgh, East Lothian, Midlothian and West Lothian council areas. It is headquartered in Edinburgh, Scotland.

== Services ==
It is responsible for the care provided by around 29,000 staff at a number of locations:

- 21 hospitals, including four major teaching hospitals
- 126 GP practices
- 180 community pharmacies
- 173 dental practices
- 112 ophthalmic practices

== Community Health Partnerships ==
The Edinburgh Community Health Partnership (CHP) has responsibilities around delivering community health services and also addressing inequalities in Edinburgh for NHS Lothian.

When the CHPs were established in 2005 they provided a single management structure, taking over control of community services which were transferred under their control. On 1 April 2007, Edinburgh Community Health Partnership was formed by the merging of 2 CHPs: Edinburgh North and Edinburgh South.

== NHS Lothian's Accident and Emergency ==
Accident and emergency departments are located within the Royal Infirmary of Edinburgh, St. John's Hospital and the Royal Hospital for Sick Children. Performance has been rated the poorest in Scotland. Only 89.4 per cent of emergency patients were treated or admitted within four hours in November 2017.

== Minor Injury Dept ==
The Royal Infirmary of Edinburgh and Western General Hospital have nurse-practitioner led Minor Injury Units. They are open every day of the year and treat bone breaks, dislocations sprains, wounds and burns. The Royal Infirmary of Edinburgh's Minor Injury Unit also treat eye problems. They are an alternative to Accident and Emergency departments and helps to appropriately treat patients whilst helping to reduce unnecessary A & E attendance.

== Hospitals ==
=== City of Edinburgh ===
- Astley Ainslie Hospital
- Chalmers Hospital
- Ellen's Glen House
- Ferryfield House
- Lauriston Building
- Leith Community Treatment Centre
- Liberton Hospital
- Princess Alexandra Eye Pavilion
- Royal Edinburgh Hospital
- Royal Hospital for Children and Young People
- Royal Infirmary of Edinburgh
- Western General Hospital

=== East Lothian ===
- Belhaven Hospital, Dunbar
- East Lothian Community Hospital, Haddington
- Edington Cottage Hospital, North Berwick

=== Midlothian ===
- Midlothian Community Hospital, Bonnyrigg

=== West Lothian ===
- St John's Hospital, Livingston
- Tippethill House Hospital, Whitburn

== Headquarters ==
NHS Lothian was based at the Deaconess House until 2010 when it moved to Waverley Gate, an office development within the facade of the former General Post Office in the centre of Edinburgh. In 2025 NHS Lothian moved its headquarters (HQ) from Waverley Gate to Mainpoint 102 Westport, Edinburgh.

== History ==
NHS Lothian was, Edinburgh. established in 2001 as the 'umbrella' organisation for all Lothian health services. There were also three NHS trusts operating in the area - Lothian University Hospitals, Lothian Primary Care and West Lothian Healthcare. The dissolution of these bodies in 2003-2004 meant that NHS Lothian would act as a single health authority, overseeing the planning and delivery of all the region's local health services.

In 2023, the health board of NHS Lothian publicly announced that they would be providing reparations for slavery after discovering that the Royal Infirmary of Edinburgh owned a slave plantation in Jamaica from 1750 to 1893 (with slavery being abolished on the island in 1833). The plantation, known as Red Hill Pen, was left to the Royal Infirmary of Edinburgh through the will of Scottish surgeon Archibald Kerr along with 39 slaves. According to the BBC, the Royal Infirmary of Edinburgh used the wealth generated from Red Hill Pen to "buy medicines, construct a new building, employ staff, and heal Edinburgh's "sick poor"."

== Performance ==
Between April 2014 and February 2015 the board paid out almost £8 million to private hospitals for the treatment of more than 4,500 patients in order to meet waiting time targets. In an attempt to comply with the Scottish Treatment Time Guarantee, a 12-week target for inpatient or day-case patients waiting for treatment, the board spent £11.3 million on private hospital treatment for NHS patients in 2013–14.
