= Robert Walmsley (anatomist) =

Scottish anatomist

- Born: 24 August 1906; Greenock, Scotland
- Died: 24 August 1998 (aged 92)
- Education: University of Edinburgh
- Occupation: Anatomist
- Spouse: Isabel Mary Mathieson
- Children: 2 sons, including Vice Admiral Sir Robert Walmsley
- Relatives: Thomas Walmsley (brother); Emma Walmsley (granddaughter)

Robert Walmsley FRSE FRCPE FRCSE TD (24 August 1906 – 24 August 1998) was a 20th-century Scottish anatomist who was Professor of Anatomy at the University of St Andrews.

== Early life ==
He was born in Greenock on 24 August 1906, the son of Thomas Walmsley, a marine engineer living at 59 South Street. He was educated at Greenock Academy and at the University of Edinburgh, graduating MB ChB in 1930.

== Career ==
After graduation Walmsley was appointed a demonstrator in Anatomy under Professor James Couper Brash and subsequently Lecturer, then Senior Lecturer. In 1937, his MD, for a thesis concerning the vascular system of the foetal whale, was awarded with gold medal. He carried out this research as a Rockefeller scholar at the Carnegie Institute of Embryology in Baltimore, supervised by George L. Streeter, and on the Pacific coast of Canada. He also undertook post-doctoral research in Berlin.

He joined the Territorial Army branch of the RAMC in 1938. In the Second World War he was a pathologist with the Royal Army Medical Corps in the Middle East, rising to the rank of Major.

In 1945 he was elected a Fellow of the Royal Society of Edinburgh. His proposers were James Couper Brash, Alexander Murray Drennan, Guy Frederic Marrian, John Gaddum and Thomas Mackie.

He remained in the Territorial Army after the war and received the Territorial Decoration (TD) for 40 years service in 1984.

In 1946, Walmsley was appointed to the Bute Chair of Anatomy at St Andrews. This followed a three-year inter-regnum through the war, following the death in office of Prof David Waterston in 1942. He remained at St Andrews until his retirement in 1973, acting as Visiting Professor to George Washington University (USA) in 1960 and Auckland University (NZ) in 1968. On his retirement, he was awarded an honorary Doctorate of Science (DSc) by the University of St Andrews and appointed Professor Emeritus. In 1978, with Hamish Watson of Dundee, he published The Clinical Anatomy of the Heart.

In 1951 Walmsley was elected a member of the Harveian Society of Edinburgh and was its president in 1964.

== Personal life ==
In 1939, he married Dr Isabel Mary Mathieson and they had two sons. Their elder son, Vice Admiral Sir Robert Walmsley, was a Royal Navy officer and Chief of Defence Procurement at the UK Ministry of Defence from 1996 to 2003.

He was the younger brother of Thomas Walmsley FRSE.

He died in Kirkcaldy in Fife on his 92nd birthday, 24 August 1998.
