= Hamish Watson =

Hamish Watson may refer to:

- Hamish Watson (footballer) (born 1993), New Zealand footballer
- Hamish Watson (paediatrician), paediatric cardiac catheterisation
- Hamish Watson (rugby union) (born 1991), English-born Scottish rugby union player

== See also ==
- Dr. Watson - His middle name is sometimes referred to as Hamish.
