= Dundee Royal Infirmary =

- NHS Tayside
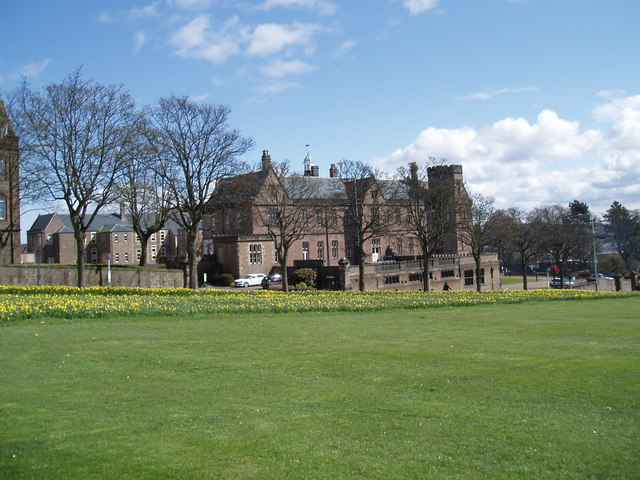
- Former Dundee Royal Infirmary

- Shown in Dundee

Geography
- Location: Dundee, Scotland, United Kingdom
- Coordinates: 56°27′56″N 2°58′52″W

Organisation
- Care system: Public NHS
- Type: General

History
- Founded: 1798
- Closed: 1998

Links
- Lists: Hospitals in Scotland

Dundee Royal Infirmary, often shortened to DRI, was a major teaching hospital in Dundee, Scotland. Until the opening of Ninewells Hospital in 1974, Dundee Royal Infirmary was Dundee's main hospital. It was closed in 1998, after 200 years of operation.

== History ==
Dundee Royal Infirmary's origins lay in a voluntary dispensary founded in Dundee by Dr Robert Stewart and the local minister Robert Small in 1782, building on a similar venture started in 1735. In 1793, it was proposed that an infirmary for indoor patients should be founded. This proposal was realised when the Dundee Infirmary was opened in King Street on 11 March 1798, just under four years after its foundation stone had been laid, with the cost of the building being £1,400. At first, this building housed 56 beds, but it was expanded by the addition of wings between 1825 and 1827 which raised its capacity to 120 beds. The infirmary was granted a royal charter by George III in 1819, after which it became known as the "Dundee Royal Infirmary and Asylum". In 1820, the asylum was formally established as a separate entity in its own premises in Albert Street, and the hospital gained its official title of "Dundee Royal Infirmary", although locals would often simply refer to it as "the DRI". After the granting of its own royal charter in 1875, the Asylum became Dundee Royal Lunatic Asylum. It moved outside the town to Liff in 1882 and eventually evolved into Royal Dundee Liff Hospital.

When opened in 1798 the infirmary had two physicians, Sir Alexander Douglas and Dr John Willison and seven visiting surgeons who rotated on a monthly basis. The surgical department included Mr John Crichton who remained associated with the hospital until 1860. The first nurse at the hospital was Mrs Farquharson. The first matron was Mrs Jane Sandeman appointed in 1837 (prior to that the matron's duties had been filled by the housekeeper-matron). Another founding member of staff was Thomas Nicoll, who had been appointed apothecary in 1796.

Despite the extensions of the 1820s, the expanding population of Dundee and lack of bed space meant that the King Street premises were no longer adequate by the middle of the nineteenth century. As a result, in 1852, building started on a new site in Barrack Road, with the foundation stone being laid by the Duke of Atholl. This new building was completed and opened in February 1855 when the last patients were transferred from the old building. Located near Dudhope Castle, the new home of the infirmary was a large neo-Elizabethan construct with a central gatehouse comparable to that of an Oxbridge College. Designed by the London architects Messrs Coe and Goodwin, the building, which later historians described as being 'a striking addition to Dundee's skyline', proved to be more expensive to build than anticipated, with the £14,000 raised for the project by public subscription failing to cover the building costs. On top of this the Normandy stone around the building's windows proved unable to cope with the climate and within thirty years had to be replaced at a cost of around £5,000. The new building was originally built to accommodate 220 patients, but it was extended several times as the hospital expanded its services, including the addition of new children's wards and facilities for out patients. Following the opening of the new building, the King Street building was turned into model lodgings.

Originally fever patients had been treated in ordinary wards at DRI, but as awareness of the need for isolation to prevent the spread of contagious disease grew during the nineteenth century, this practice ceased. In the 1860s and 1870s smallpox and typhus patients were treated in wooden pavilions at other sites and this ultimately led to the opening of a separate hospital for infectious diseases at King's Cross in 1889.

Further royal charters were granted in 1877 and 1898. The former charter was granted on the occasion of the opening of a convalescent home connected with the hospital at 31 Strathmore Street, Barnhill which had been endowed by the philanthropist Sir David Baxter, (this was not connected to the similarly named Dundee Convalescent Hospital). The Convalescent Home, which was finally demolished in 1971, could hold up to 84 patients and was part of a 7-acre site. The site was then acquired by the East of Scotland Housing Association and is now occupied by Fettercairn Drive and Stracathro Terrace. Prior to the creation of the National Health Service, the infirmary depended heavily on the generosity of wealthy benefactors such as the aforementioned Sir David Baxter and other textile magnates including Peter Carmichael of Arthurstone and James Key Caird. Donations from Caird provided the hospital with cancer and maternity facilities.

In 1892, an ophthalmic department was established at the infirmary. This included two four-bed wards for treating patients from the Dundee Eye Institution. The Eye Institution had been set up in 1836 to provide free ophthalmic treatment, but originally sent patients to Edinburgh and Glasgow for operations. From 1910 DRI also ran the Sidlaw Sanatorium at Auchterhouse which had opened in 1902 to treat Tuberculosis patients. Later known as Sidlaw Hospital, it closed in 1980 and had in its latter days served as a convalescent home and was also to provide respite care.

During World War I, part of the Infirmary was requisitioned for use as a military hospital. At this time Dundee had a time gun, which was fired daily at 1pm, located in the grounds of the nearby Dudhope Castle. As the Infirmary was treating soldiers suffering from shell-shock, the gun ceased to be used in 1916. The running of the hospital was taken over by the newly formed National Health Service on 5 July 1948 and along with other hospitals in the area it was placed under the control of the newly formed Dundee General Hospitals Board of Management. A specialist Neurosurgery Department was set up in the 1960s by Joseph Block and Ivan Jacobson, who pioneered the use of advanced neuro-surgical techniques at the hospital, and officially opened in 1966. In the 1970s, the hospital became one of the first in the United Kingdom to acquire a CAT scan head scanner, when it did so under Jacobson's guidance. Neurosurgery in Dundee would remain at the Royal Infirmary, only being transferred to Ninewells when DRI closed. When Ninewells opened in 1974, DRI remained as the principal emergency centre for Dundee, with the expectation that this, and other functions it retained, would be moved at a later date when additional facilities were developed on the Ninewells site.

The former Dundee Women's Hospital which also became part of the NHS in 1948 effectively acted as an annex to DRI in the years leading up to its own closure in the 1970s.

The construction of Ninewells cast a shadow on DRI's future as it was assumed one of Dundee's older hospitals would close. On top of this by the 1950s there was an urgent need for better facilities for the teaching of medicine at Queen's College, Dundee and this required improvements be made to either Maryfield Hospital or DRI along with the building of a new hospital. In 1960 a plan was approved to spend up to £800,000 redeveloping Maryfield by 1970, which assumed that it would be DRI that would close when Ninewells opened. However, after much debate this plan was scrapped and it was decided to retain DRI and Maryfield was closed when Ninewells became operational. DRI finally closed in 1998; its remaining functions were moved to the larger and more modern facilities at Ninewells.

After closure, the buildings and site were declared to be surplus to requirements by the Dundee Teaching Hospitals NHS Trust and announced to be available for development. The main building, which opened in 1855, survives, having been converted for use as flats.

== Teaching hospital ==
Dundee Royal Infirmary was a major teaching hospital. It was at first linked with the University of St Andrews via its medical school located at University College, Dundee, and, after 1967, with the University of Dundee. Most, but not all, of its teaching functions were transferred to Ninewells Hospital after the latter's construction, although it was initially to be kept as a second teaching hospital, functioning as a 'combined unit' with Ninewells. Ultimately however, the arrival of Ninewells, and its usurping of DRI's role as Dundee's major acute care and teaching hospital, would ultimately doom the infirmary.

The hospital was also home to a training school for nurses. In 1873 the recently appointed medical superintendent Dr R. Sinclair reported that the Infirmary's nursing department was in an unsatisfactory state, with the weakness and inefficiency of night staff being a particular problem. To tackle this issue he recommended a nursing school be set up to train young women 'of good character and education'. This was then set up under Mrs Rebecca Strong (c 1834–1934), who came to the Infirmary as Matron in 1874. Mrs Strong had previously been a pupil of Florence Nightingale at St Thomas' Hospital. According to the official history of DRI written in 1948, by the time she left to take up a similar post as Glasgow Royal Infirmary in 1878 the training programme had raised the Infirmary's nursing department to a high standard.

The staff at Dundee Royal Infirmary included several notable academics. Lloyd Turton Price, who became Professor of Surgery in 1920, was noted for his excellent clinical teaching as well as his skill as a surgeon. Following his unexpected death in 1933, 2,000 people attended his funeral. Margaret Fairlie, head of the Infirmary's Obstetrics and Gynaecology Department between 1936 and 1956, became the first woman to hold a professorial chair in Scotland when she was appointed Professor of Obstetrics and Gynaecology in 1940. Fairlie, a popular figure with both students and colleagues, retired from the university and DRI in 1956, but continued to be associated with both until her death in 1963. Also based at the Infirmary was Sir Donald Douglas, who would use his research into surgical infection and wound healing to help design Ninewells Hospital. Douglas, Professor of Surgery from 1951, was considered to be an inspiring teacher.

== Notable staff ==
Several notable medics spent part of their careers working at Dundee Royal Infirmary. They included:

- Richard Charles Alexander CBE – Professor of Surgery at the University of St. Andrews 1936–1951.
- Sir Douglas Black – Chief Scientist at the Department of Health and Social Security 1973–1977, President of the Royal College of Physicians and Chairman of the British Medical Association.
- John Crichton (1772–1860) – A pioneering Dundee born surgeon who was noted for his success rate in performing lithotomies and was associated with the hospital for over sixty years.
- Sir Donald Douglas – Professor of Surgery at the University of St Andrews and, from 1967, at the University of Dundee and Queen's Surgeon in Scotland.
- David Rutherford Dow – Later Master of Queens College, Dundee.
- Margaret Fairlie – The first female professor at a university in Scotland and pioneer in the use of radium in Scotland.
- David Middleton Greig – Surgeon and educator who was a globally recognised expert on the pathology of bone.
- Sir Ian Hill – Noted cardiologist and Professor of Medicine at the University of St Andrews and, from 1967, at the University of Dundee.
- Ivan Jacobson – Noted Neuro-surgeon.
- Katherine McCall Anderson, Royal Red Cross & Bar (1866-1924), noted military and civilian matron, trained and worked at Dundee Royal Infirmary
- Margaret Currie Neilson Lamb the first nurse to Chair the General Nursing Council Scotland trained and worked as a nurse at the Dundee Royal Infirmary
- Kenneth Lowe CVO – Cardiologist noted for pioneering studies into intra-cardiac electrocardiography and Physician to the Queen in Scotland.
- Thomas John MacLagan – The Medical Superintendent of Dundee Royal Infirmary from 1864 until 1866. Pioneered the clinical use of thermometers and whose research contributed to the development of aspirin.
- George Pirie – Pioneer in the clinical use of x-rays.
- Lloyd Turton Price FRCSEd – Professor of Surgery.
- James F. Riley – Radiotherapist and discoverer of the origin of histamine.
- Hamish Watson – Noted cardiologist.

== Legacy ==
The extensive archives of Dundee Royal Infirmary are kept by University of Dundee Archive Services as part of the NHS Tayside Archive. This collection includes patient records dating back to 1842 and hospital reports from 1826. The archives also include the royal charter issued in 1819. Volunteers are working on a project which will index the admission registers of the infirmary that the archives holds.

Items from Dundee Royal Infirmary are also included in the collections held by Tayside Medical History Museum, based at Ninewells Hospital. Ninewells is also now home to many of the commemorative plaques from Dundee Royal Infirmary. These, along with other items relating to the hospital, are displayed on the DRI Memorial Wall, which was unveiled in November 2008, and can be found at the entrance to Ninewell's South Block.
