= John Glaister =

Scottish forensic scientist

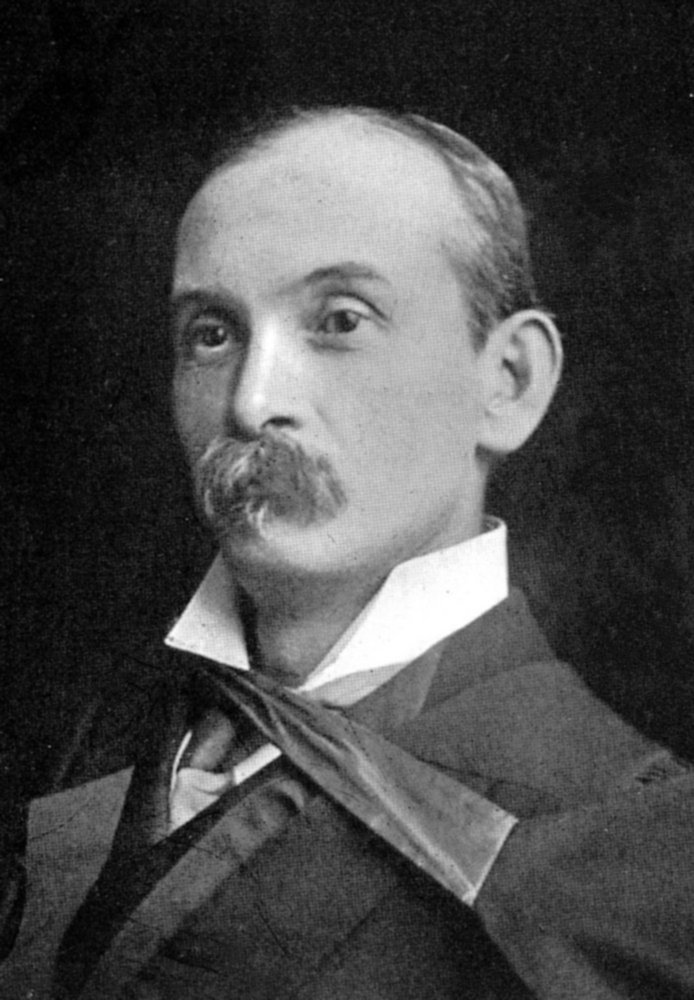
John Glaister

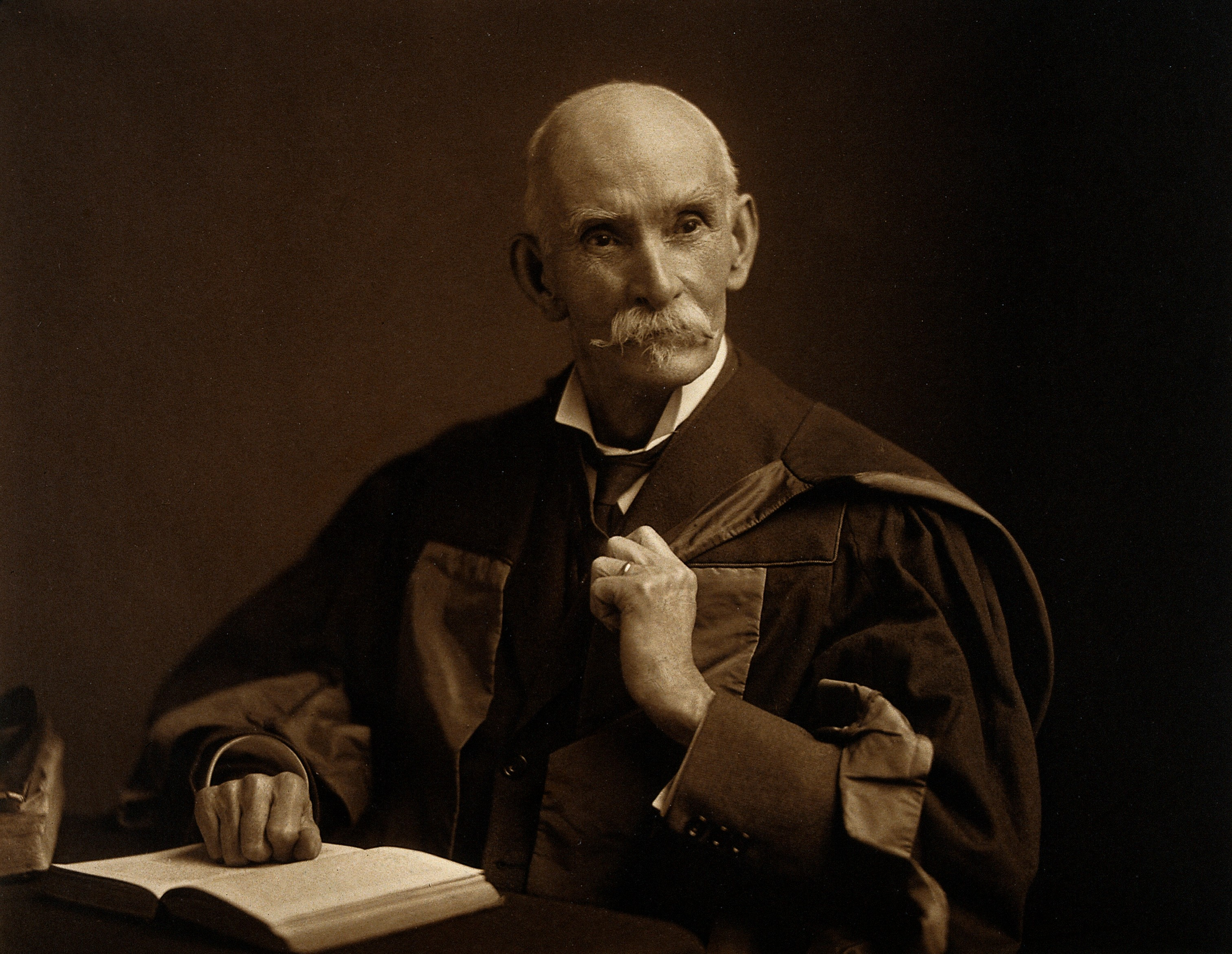
Prof John Glaister in old age

Professor John Glaister (9 March 1856 – 18 December 1932) was a Scottish forensic scientist who worked as a general practitioner, police surgeon, and as a lecturer at Glasgow Royal Infirmary Medical School and the University of Glasgow. Glasgow University's Glaister Prize is named in his honour.

== Life ==
Glaister was born in Lanark on 9 March 1856 the son of Joseph Glaister and his wife, Marion Hamilton Weir. He attended the Lanark Grammar School. In 1873, he enrolled to the Faculty of Medicine of Glasgow University. After graduating, he became a police surgeon and a general practitioner in Townhead. In 1881, he was appointed a lecturer in Medical Jurisprudence at the Glasgow Royal Infirmary Medical School, and in 1887 a Special Lecturer in Public Health.

In 1888 he was promoted to Professor of Forensic Medicine and Public Health, which post he held until 1931, being succeeded by his son and namesake.

In 1898 he was elected a Fellow of the Royal Society of Edinburgh. His proposers were John Gray McKendrick, William Jack, Frederick Orpen Bower and James Thomson Bottomley. At this time he had consulting rooms at 71 North St Mungo Street in Glasgow.

In 1902, he published his most famous work, A Textbook of Medical Jurisprudence, Toxicology and Public Health. He was also noted as an expert witness in widely publicised legal cases such as the trial of Oscar Slater in 1909.

He died at 3 Newton Place in Glasgow on 17 December 1932.

== Family ==
He was married to Mary Scott Clark. Their second son John Glaister (1892-1971) was also a physician and also a Fellow of the Royal Society of Edinburgh.

His daughter married Dr John Borland McVail, son of his friend Dr John McVail.

== John Glaister Jr ==
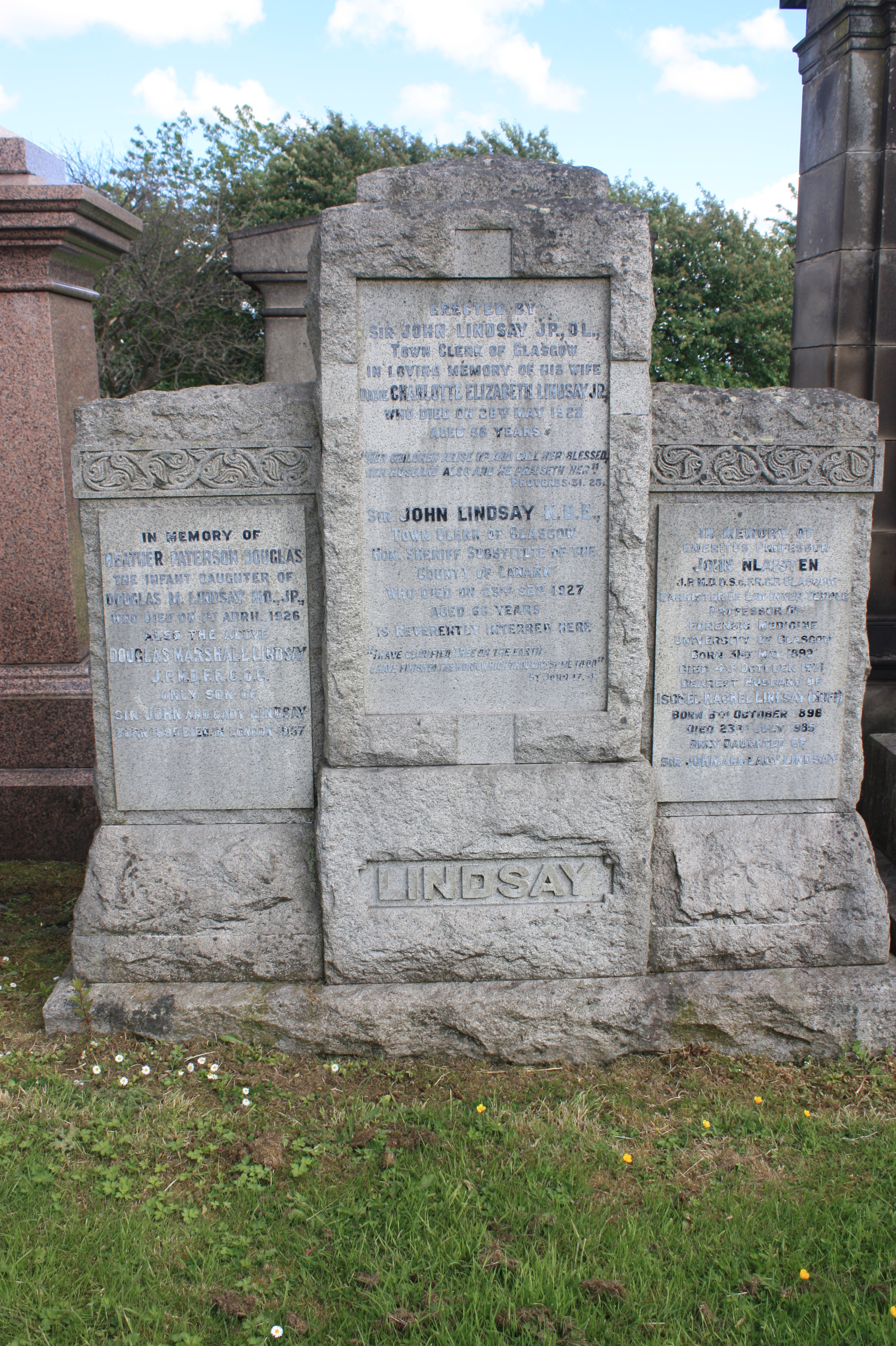
The grave of John Lindsay 1892-1971, Glasgow Necropolis

John was born on 31 May 1892 in Glasgow. He was raised at the family home at 4 Grafton Place off Grafton Square in Glasgow. His career closely paralleled that of his father. He was educated at Glasgow High School then studied medicine at Glasgow University graduating in 1925. He assisted his father and Glasgow police until 1928, then served at the University of Cairo as Professor of Forensic Medicine, replacing Prof Sydney Smith.

He succeeded his father as Professor of Forensic Medicine at Glasgow University in 1931. He made special studies of human and mammal hairs, to be able to distinguish one from another.

In 1934 he was elected a Fellow of the Royal Society of Edinburgh. His proposers were Andrew Hunter, Edward Provan Cathcart, Sir Edward Battersby Bailey and James Gordon Gray.

In 1935 he famously solved a human jigsaw of 70 body parts in the Buck Ruxton murder case. Here he successfully identified two separate female victims (Ruxton's wife and maid) from the various parts.

The author Erle Stanley Gardner dedicated a Perry Mason book, "The Case of the Horrified Heirs", to Glaister.

His nephew, the television producer Gerard Glaister, based his 1968 production The Expert on his work.

He retired in 1962 and died on 3 October 1971. He is buried on the top section of the Glasgow Necropolis with his wife, Isobel Rachel Lindsay, in the family grave of her father, Sir John Lindsay, Town Clerk of Glasgow.

=== Publications ===
- A Text-book of Medical Jurisprudence and Toxicology (3rd ed.). New York: W. Wood & Co. 1915.
- Legal Medicine (1922)
- Medico-Legal Aspects of the Ruxton Case (1936) co-written with James Couper Brash
- A Study of Hairs and Wools (1937)
- Recent Advances in Forensic Medicine (1939)
- The Power of Poison (1954)
- Final Diagnosis (1964) his autobiography
