= Buck Ruxton =

British physician and murderer

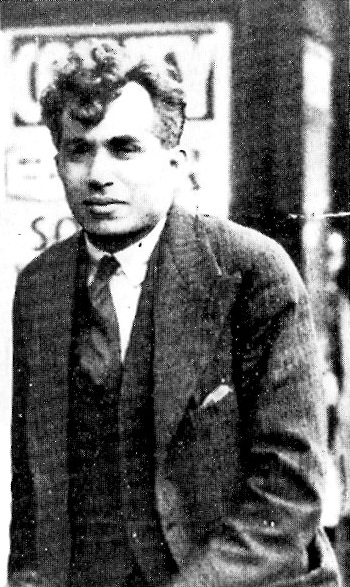
- Ruxton, c. 1934
- Born: Buktyar Rustomji Ratanji Hakim; 21 March 1899; Bombay, British India
- Died: 12 May 1936 (aged 37); HM Prison Manchester, England
- Other name: The Savage Surgeon
- Occupation: Physician
- Children: 3
- Status: Executed by hanging 12 May 1936
- Motive: Jealousy (Isabella Ruxton); Eyewitness elimination (Mary Jane Rogerson)
- Conviction: Murder
- Penalty: Death

Details
- Victims: 2
- Date: 15 September 1935
- Country: United Kingdom
- Location: Lancaster, Lancashire
- Date apprehended: 13 October 1935
- Imprisoned at: HM Prison Manchester

Buck Ruxton (born Bukhtyar Chompa Rustomji Ratanji Hakim; 21 March 1899 – 12 May 1936) was an Indian-born physician convicted and subsequently hanged for the September 1935 murders of his common-law wife, Isabella Ruxton (née Kerr), and the family housemaid, Mary Jane Rogerson, at his home in Lancaster, England. These murders are informally known as the Bodies Under the Bridge and the Jigsaw Murders, while Ruxton himself became known as The Savage Surgeon.

The case became known as the "Bodies Under the Bridge" due to the location, near the Dumfriesshire town of Moffat in the Southern Uplands of Scotland, where the bodies were found. The case was also called the "Jigsaw Murders" because of the painstaking efforts to re-assemble and identify the victims and determine the place of their murder. Ruxton himself earned the title of "The Savage Surgeon" due to his occupation and the extensive mutilation he inflicted upon his victims' bodies.

The murders committed by Buck Ruxton would prove to be one of the United Kingdom's most publicised murder cases of the 1930s. The case itself is primarily remembered for the innovative forensic techniques employed to identify the victims and to prove that their murders had been committed within the Ruxton household.

== Early life ==
=== Childhood and youth ===
Buck Ruxton was born in Bombay, British India (now Mumbai), on 21 March 1899 into a wealthy middle-class Parsi family of French origin.

Ruxton received a respectable upbringing, and despite being a sensitive youth with few friends, he was highly intelligent and received a thorough education. By his teenage years, he had resolved to pursue a career in medicine. With the financial support of his parents, Ruxton studied at the University of Bombay, where he qualified as a Bachelor of Medicine in 1922. The following year, he qualified as a Bachelor of Surgery at the same institute. Shortly after completing his studies, Ruxton obtained employment at a Bombay hospital, where he specialised in medicine, midwifery, and gynaecology.

On 29 October 1923, Ruxton was commissioned into the Indian Medical Service as a medical officer; he served in postings at Basra and, later, Baghdad, before relinquishing his commission in October 1926.

In May 1925, Ruxton married a Parsi woman named Motibai Jehangirji Ghadiali. The marriage was an arranged one, which ultimately turned out to be short-lived. When Ruxton relocated to Britain the following year, he concealed all evidence of this marriage, although in 1928, he did contact his father-in-law, Jehangirji, requesting he immediately send him the sum of £200 via telegraphic transfer.

=== Relocation to Britain ===
With financial assistance from his family and the Bombay Medical Service, Ruxton relocated to Britain in 1926. He attended medical courses at London's University College Hospital under the name Gabriel Hakim, before moving to Edinburgh in 1927 to begin studies towards obtaining a Fellowship of the Royal Colleges of Surgeons. Although Ruxton failed his entrance examination, the General Medical Council authorised his practising medicine in the United Kingdom on the strength of the qualifications he had earlier obtained in Bombay. Shortly thereafter, he legally changed his name via deed poll to "Buck Ruxton".

While studying to become a Fellow of the Royal Colleges of Surgeons in Edinburgh, Ruxton became acquainted with a 26-year-old woman named Isabella Van Ess, who managed a café in the city. At the time of their acquaintance, Isabella was still legally married to a Dutchman whom she had wed in 1919, but this marriage had only lasted a matter of weeks, and she had resumed using her maiden name of Kerr. The two began courting, and Isabella was with Ruxton when he relocated to England in 1928. He worked as a locum to a London doctor, a fellow Parsi named Manek Motofram, and later as an assistant to a Stepney-based doctor named. B. R. Rygate. In August the following year, Isabella gave birth to the couple's first child, a daughter they named Elizabeth Ava. (Note: Although Ruxton and Isabella never married, she adopted his surname, and both presented themselves as a married couple.)

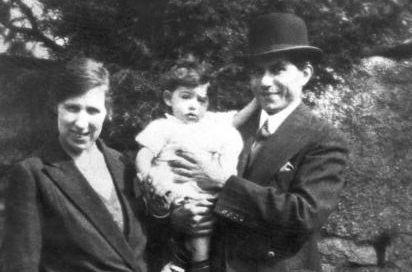
Buck and Isabella Ruxton, pictured with their oldest daughter, Elizabeth, in 1930.

=== Establishment of medical practice ===
In 1930, the Ruxtons relocated from London to Lancaster, Lancashire, where he established a medical practice at his family home at 2 Dalton Square.

Ruxton had made great efforts to assimilate himself into British society, and he quickly acquired a reputation among his patients as a diligent and compassionate general physician who was well-respected and popular within the community. He is known to have waived his treatment fees on several occasions when he felt his patients could not afford to pay them. The following year, a second daughter, Diane Rose, was born. Two years later, in July 1933, Isabella gave birth to a son named William Gladstone. The same year, the Ruxtons employed a young maid and live-in housekeeper named Mary Jane Rogerson (b. 8 October 1915), primarily to care for their children.

=== Jealousy and domestic violence ===
Despite his esteemed reputation within the Lancaster community, the relationship between Buck and Isabella Ruxton was fraught, and he became increasingly suspicious of Isabella's alleged infidelity, reportedly exploding into fits of rage or bouts of tearful hysteria and self-pity behind closed doors. (Note: When asked about his relationship with Isabella at his subsequent trial, Ruxton exclaimed: "We were the sort of people who could not live with each other, or without each other".) On several occasions, these arguments would prompt Isabella to pack her belongings and return to Edinburgh with her children, although inevitable phone calls from Ruxton in which he would tearfully plead with Isabella to return to Lancaster would prompt her to return to him, and he would later state to investigators that on the frequent occasions Isabella would return to Dalton Square, she would almost invariably say to him: "I wonder how I could ever pick up an argument with you".

It is unknown precisely when Ruxton began to accuse Isabella of adultery and assault her, although loud quarrels between the couple had resulted in police interventions on several occasions. The disputes between the couple occasionally had to be settled at the Lancaster police station, where police would observe Ruxton talking erratically before bursting into tears. Furthermore, Isabella is known to have attempted suicide by inert gas asphyxiation in 1932, and this suicide attempt had resulted in her suffering a miscarriage.

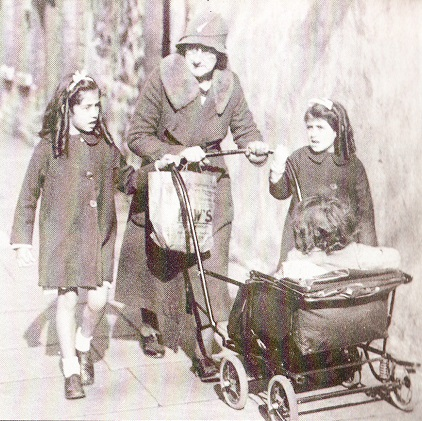
The Ruxton children, seen with the maid of a family friend in 1935.

On one occasion in 1933, Isabella complained to police that her husband had begun beating her; when police visited Ruxton's practice to investigate her claims, Ruxton denied he had assaulted his wife, alleging that Isabella had been unfaithful to him. Nonetheless, within twenty-four hours of this incident, Isabella had returned to her partner. On another occasion in April 1934 a Lancaster policeman had been called to the Ruxton household following another quarrel. Upon his arrival, the officer was informed by Ruxton: "Sergeant, I feel like murdering two persons ... my wife is going out to meet a man".

In early-September 1935, Isabella Ruxton travelled to Edinburgh to visit one of her sisters. In her company were a prominent Lancaster family named Edmondson, with whom the Ruxtons were closely acquainted. To tend to the needs of his practice, Ruxton himself did not accompany his common-law wife on this trip, and thus remained in Lancaster. He would later confess to investigators that he had been convinced that as Isabella had been known to occasionally keep social company with a young man named Robert Edmondson—an assistant editor in the local Town Hall—she had been conducting an affair with him, and thus had used this trip as a means for the pair to continue their supposed affair. Hotel records would later confirm each adult had booked into separate rooms while they had stayed in Edinburgh. (Note: Although Isabella was an outgoing woman who enjoyed socialising with leading Lancaster residents and was a popular guest at local functions, no solid proof was ever provided to support Ruxton's claims she had ever been unfaithful to him. Nonetheless, one Lancaster resident would later state that Isabella Ruxton had indeed kept regular company with Robert Edmondson.)

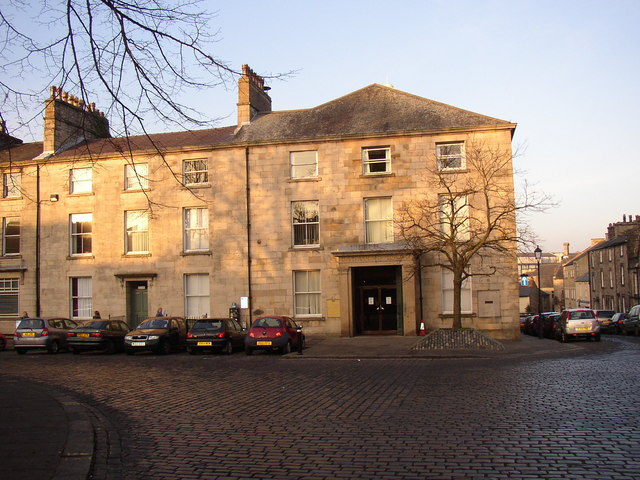
2 Dalton Square, Lancaster (seen to the left in this image). Ruxton established both his medical practice and his family home at this address in 1930.

== Murders ==
=== Commission ===
On the evening of 14 September 1935 Isabella Ruxton left the family home to view the Blackpool Illuminations and visit two of her sisters (both of whom lived near Blackpool). She left Blackpool to return home at approximately 11:30 pm. Upon her return to Dalton Square in the early hours of Sunday, 15 September, Ruxton's jealousy and paranoia apparently overwhelmed him, and he most likely strangled Isabella into submissiveness, unconsciousness, or death with his bare hands, before beating and stabbing her body. Either to prevent their housemaid from discovering his crime or because she had actually witnessed the act, Ruxton extensively bludgeoned and either strangled or asphyxiated Mary Jane Rogerson; he probably also stabbed her body either before or after death. The amount of blood subsequently discovered on the stairs, walls, and carpeting of the Ruxton household indicates excessive blood flow prior to the bodies' mutilation, leading to the conclusion that Ruxton had stabbed either or both of the victims extensively shortly before or after death, or during the actual act of murder.

On the day prior to the murders, Ruxton informed one of the two charwomen he and Isabella employed not to come to his premises until Monday 16 September; within hours of the murders he had visited the home of the other charwoman he employed and likewise told her not to clean his premises until 16 September, explaining that Isabella and Mary Jane had travelled to Edinburgh. After he had driven his children to the home of a Morecambe dentist with whom he and Isabella had formed a close friendship and asked the couple to look after his children for the day, he returned to his home and proceeded to extensively dismember and mutilate both bodies in the bathroom of his home in an effort to hide their identities. Several hours later, at approximately 4.30 pm, Ruxton visited the home of one of his patients, a Mrs Hampshire, and asked both her and, shortly thereafter, her husband to return to Dalton Square with him to help him "prepare for the decorators", who were expected to arrive the following morning to perform work he claimed had been arranged several months previously. (Note: When Ruxton left his children in the care of the Morecambe dentist and his wife, the couple noted one of Ruxton's hands was heavily bandaged. When the couple questioned him as to how he had acquired the wound, Ruxton claimed to have cut his hand while opening a tin of fruit for his children's breakfast that morning.)

When Mrs Hampshire arrived at Dalton Square, she found the house in a state of disarray. As she would later testify at Ruxton's trial, all the carpeting had been removed from the stairs, and several sections of the flooring were littered with straw, which also protruded from beneath a locked bedroom door. Moreover, in the waiting-room of the property, Mrs. Hampshire discovered several rolled-up sections of carpeting, stair-pads, and a stained suit. In the garden of the property, she also discovered two further sections of carpeting, and several burned towels. Before the Hampshires left Dalton Square, they were given several sections of stained stair carpeting and Ruxton's stained suit to keep, upon the condition they thoroughly cleaned them. (Note: The following morning, Ruxton visited the Hampshires to request Mrs. Hampshire cut off the name-tag upon the suit.)

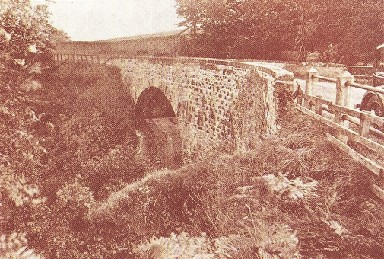
The Bridge above Gardenholme Linn stream, seen on 29 September 1935.

=== Discovery ===
On the morning of 29 September 1935 a young woman named Susan Haines Johnson glanced over the parapet of an old stone bridge located 2 miles (3 km) north of the Dumfriesshire town of Moffat. Upon the banks of the stream—named Gardenholme Linn—which ran beneath the bridge, Johnson noticed a bundle wrapped in fabric that had lodged against a boulder, with a partially decomposed human arm protruding from the package.

Police from the Dumfriesshire Constabulary were called to the scene. Discovering the remains within the package were human, officers searched the stream, surrounding ravines, and the nearby Annan River, discovering two human heads, and four further bundles, each containing extensively mutilated human remains including thigh bones, legs, sections of flesh, and a human torso and pelvis. These human remains were in an advanced state of decomposition, and had been wrapped in bedsheets, a pillow-case, children's clothing, and several newspapers (two editions of the Daily Herald dated 6 and 31 August 1935, an edition of the Sunday Graphic dated 15 September 1935, and undated portions of the Sunday Chronicle).

On 1 October the remains were examined at Moffat mortuary by the forensic scientist John Glaister Jr., and a doctor named Gilbert Millar. Both men determined the 70 separate sections of human remains thus far discovered were those of two females of notably different heights and ages, and that the mutilation conducted upon the remains had been committed by an individual with extensive anatomical knowledge in an obvious effort to complicate the identification of the remains. In addition to the extensive mutilation across both victims' entire bodies, which both Professor Glaister and Dr. Millar deduced had been entirely committed with a surgical knife as opposed to either a saw or an axe, the murderer had removed the eyes, ears, skin, lips, soft tissue, and several teeth from both heads to make identification via dental records or composite drawings impossible, with additional attention being devoted to areas of the body where possible distinguishing features such as operational scars or vaccinations may have been visible. The perpetrator had also removed the fingertips from the sole set of hands initially discovered, and had completely pared all flesh from the legs of one victim, and from the thighs of the other.

"Of the four bundles recovered during the initial search, the first was wrapped in a blouse and contained two upper arms and four pieces of flesh; the second bundle comprised two thigh bones, two legs from which most flesh had been stripped, and nine pieces of flesh, all wrapped in a pillow-case; the third was a piece of cotton sheeting containing seventeen portions of flesh; the fourth parcel, also wrapped in cotton sheeting, consisted of a human trunk, two legs with the feet tied with the hem of a cotton sheet and some wisps of straw and cotton wool. In addition, other packages opened to reveal two heads, one of which was wrapped in a child's rompers; a quantity of cotton wool and sections from the Daily Herald of 6 August 1935; two forearms with hands attached but minus the top joints of the fingers and thumbs; and several pieces of skin and flesh. One part was wrapped in the Sunday Graphic dated 15 September."

— Professor John Glaister Jr.'s inventory of the discoveries in and around the Gardenholme Linn stream and Annan River, 1 October 1935.

Glaister also noted in his autopsy reports that had the perpetrator actually thrown the remains into the nearby Annan River as opposed to the tributary river Linn (which had been swollen with heavy rains at the time), the bundles would likely have flowed into the Solway Firth, thus delaying or permanently preventing their discovery.

Given the proximity of the Gardenholme Linn stream to such a major arterial road, detectives from Glasgow CID—who had already established the remains were unlikely to be those of local individuals—began to consider the possibility the perpetrator had travelled to the Southern Uplands to dispose of the remains, and may have been unfamiliar with the area.

== Investigation ==
=== Autopsies ===
The two bodies were transported to the Anatomy Department of the University of Edinburgh, where they were first treated with ether to prevent further decomposition and destroy all maggot infestation, then preserved in a formalin solution before being reconstructed prior to Professors Glaister, James Couper Brash, and Sydney Smith conducting their formal autopsies. A further bundle containing human remains was discovered shortly after the two bodies had been transported to the University of Edinburgh; this bundle contained two human forearms, with hands attached. The fingerprints had not been completely obliterated from the sole pair of hands found with the remains, and as such, investigators were able to obtain a complete set of fingerprints. (Note: Professor Glaister's initial theory the murderer held extensive surgical knowledge was further supported at the formal autopsy by the fact a human body is almost impossible to dismember with a knife at the joints without a thorough knowledge of human anatomy. From this, Professor Glaister determined the murderer almost certainly worked in the medical profession.)

To approximate the time of death of the victims, Dumfriesshire police requested the assistance of a Glasgow-based entomologist named Alexander Mearns, who, using the then-fledgling techniques of forensic entomology to identify the age of the maggots found upon the remains, studied the life cycle of the pupae found upon the bodies in order to approximate a time of death of both victims. From his examination of the pupae found upon both sets of remains, Mearns conclusively determined the pupae had originated from a particular breed of blowfly known as Calliphora vicina, and that the maggots discovered on the remains had been laid in the immediate vicinity where they were discovered. Mearns deduced the remains could not have lain where they were discovered for less than 12 to 14 days. This conclusion suggested the victims' bodies could not have been disposed of in the location they were found after 17 September. (Note: Mearns' deduction that the victims' remains had lain in the location in which they were found for this period of time would subsequently prove to be vital circumstantial evidence at his trial attesting to his guilt.)

From the skull sutures on both bodies, Glaister and Smith were able to determine that one of the bodies was that of a woman aged about 30 to 55, probably between 35 and 45, and that the second body was that of a woman aged between 18 and 25, probably aged between 20 and 21 at the time of her murder. In reference to the cause of death, the older woman had five stab wounds to the chest, several broken bones, and numerous bruises. In addition, her lungs were remarkably congested, and her hyoid bone had been broken, indicating she had been strangled before the other injuries had been inflicted. The limbs and head of the second victim bore signs of excessive blunt force trauma, indicating she had been extensively bludgeoned with an unknown instrument. Professors Glaister, Brash, and Smith further concluded the mutilation of the two bodies would have taken approximately eight hours to complete, and that the two bodies had been drained of both blood and viscera at the time of their dismemberment. (Note: Overall, numerous national eminent experts were involved in the identification of the two bodies: * John Glaister Jr.. Regius Professor of Forensic Medicine at the University of Glasgow * Dr. Gilbert Millar. Lecturer in pathology at the University of Edinburgh * Sydney Smith. Regius Professor of Forensic Medicine at the University of Edinburgh * Arthur Hutchinson. Dean of the Edinburgh Dental Hospital and School * Thom Davies. Professor of Pathology at the University of Glasgow * Professor James Couper Brash, Professor of Anatomy at the University of Edinburgh)

=== Lancaster connection ===
Several of the pages of the Sunday Graphic in which the remains had been wrapped had been a souvenir edition of the newspaper which had been printed and circulated solely in the Morecambe and Lancaster area of England on 15 September, strongly suggesting the two victims and/or their murderer lived in North West England. As such, Inspector Jeremiah Lynch of Scotland Yard—who had been called in to assist the investigation at the request of the Chief Constable of Dumfriesshire—focused his efforts on recent missing persons reports filed within this section of England on or shortly after 15 September. In addition, the fact several sections of the victims' remains had been discovered several hundred yards downstream on the banks of the Gardenholme Linn and the Annan River suggested a date on or prior to 19 September as to when the remains had been thrown into the stream, as that had been the final date of heavy rainfall in the area and thus when the flow of water had been much greater than at the time of the victims' discovery. Furthermore, sections of the clothing in which the dismembered remains had been found were also distinctive, with unique factors such as repair patches beneath armpits upon a blouse, and knots used to tie a pair of distinctive child's rompers, suggesting either or both of the victims may have borne children.

Five days before the discovery of the human remains in Moffat, Ruxton had visited Lancaster police, claiming his wife had "once again" deserted him; he had earlier visited the Morecambe household of the parents of the family maid, Mary Jane Rogerson, claiming their daughter, having recently engaged in an affair with a local youth, had become pregnant and that his wife had agreed to discreetly take her away from their home to arrange an abortion. As abortions were at that time illegal in Britain, Ruxton had urged the Rogersons not to contact the police.

On 1 October the Rogersons visited Ruxton at his practice. On this occasion, he attempted to placate their fears for Mary Jane's safety by claiming both she and his wife had broken into his safe and stolen £30 before eloping from his household. Despite Ruxton's insistence on this occasion that his wife and Mary Jane would almost certainly return once they had spent the money, the fact Ruxton had now given the Rogersons contrary explanations as to why his wife and their daughter were missing from his household aroused their suspicions. As such, the following day, they filed a missing persons report with Morecambe police. (Ruxton himself would not visit Lancaster police to formally report his wife and maid as missing until 4 October.)

=== Identification ===
On 9 October Scottish police visited the Rogerson household and asked Mary Jane's parents if they were able to identify any sections of clothing in which the bodies had been wrapped: Mrs Rogerson immediately recognised a blouse with distinct patchwork repair beneath one armpit as having belonged to her daughter, whom they had last seen on Saturday 14 September. Mrs Rogerson was unable to identify the pair of child's rompers shown to her, but suggested the police should show the garment to a friend of hers named Edith Holme, who lived in Grange-over-Sands and with whom Isabella, Mary Jane, and the Ruxton children had briefly lodged earlier that year on a brief vacation to Morecambe Bay. When Mrs Holme saw the rompers, she immediately recognised them as a pair she had bought for one of the Ruxton children the previous summer.

Conversing with his Lancashire counterpart, the Chief Constable of Dumfriesshire discovered that Mary Jane's employer, Ruxton, had informally reported his wife missing the previous month, and that the final confirmed sightings of Isabella alive by anyone other than Ruxton himself had been on the evening of 14 September, when she had left her two sisters in Blackpool to return to her Lancaster home, having travelled to the seaside resort to view the Blackpool Illuminations.

The same day that police identified several items of the clothing used to wrap the dismembered remains, Ruxton again visited the Lancaster police station; on this occasion, he burst into tears, complaining that local rumours had begun to circulate regarding the discoveries of the human remains in Scotland as being those of his wife and maid, and that these rumours were proving to be detrimental to both his medical practice and his general reputation. He then requested they conduct discreet enquiries to locate his wife and maid, before demanding police search his house to quash these rumours. Although Ruxton was placated by officers before being driven home, at this point he was considered the prime suspect in the murders by all law enforcement personnel thus far involved in the investigation. Lancaster police had by this stage spoken to one of the Ruxtons' two charladies, Agnes Oxley, who confirmed to officers that on 15 September, Ruxton had arrived at her home and informed her that it was unnecessary for her to work at his premises until the following day, and that when she had arrived at 2 Dalton Square the following day, the house had been in a general state of shambles, with carpets removed, a pile of burned fabric-like material in the garden, and the bathtub extensively stained with a yellowish discolouration. Furthermore, Ruxton had specifically requested she clean the bathtub that day, before explaining to her that the reason his hand was bandaged was that he had jammed it in a door.

Conversing with the Ruxtons' neighbours, Lancaster police also discovered that Ruxton had asked Mrs Hampshire and her husband to extensively clean his house in preparation for redecoration, explaining that he was unable to do so himself as he had badly cut his hand opening a tin of fruit several days earlier. He had also given the Hampshires several stained carpets and a suit, saying they could keep them if they washed them.

== Arrest ==
On the evening of 12 October Ruxton was arrested by Lancaster police and extensively questioned throughout the night. (Note: Having been placed under arrest, when closing his practice, Ruxton placed a notice on the window of his office, urging his patients and the Lancaster community in general to maintain belief in his innocence, adding, "I am an innocent victim of circumstances.") When asked to account for his whereabouts between 14 and 29 September, Ruxton produced a handwritten document entitled 'My Movements', which he then passed to investigators before making a voluntary statement based on what he had written. He then acquiesced to the investigators' interview.

"Listen carefully to me. I intend to prefer a very serious charge against you. You are charged that between 14 and 29 September 1935 you did feloniously, and with malice aforethought, kill one Mary Jane Rogerson."

— Lancaster Chief Constable Henry J. Vann formally charging Buck Ruxton with the murder of Mary Jane Rogerson. 13 October 1935.

In this interview, Ruxton denied he had ever been to Scotland after having established his Lancaster practice. However, he was unable to explain just why his car registration number had been logged by a young cyclist whom he had knocked over in the Cumbrian town of Kendal on 17 September, which had led to his vehicle being intercepted in nearby Milnthorpe the same day, as the cyclist had reported his registration number—which he had logged in his pocketbook—to police when he had failed to stop at the scene of the accident. Lancaster police suggested to Ruxton this incident was strong circumstantial evidence as the incident had occurred as he had been driving en route to Lancaster from Moffat—which he denied. He was further unable to explain just why a police search of his home the previous day had revealed extensive traces of bloodstains on the stairs, railings, balustrade, and various carpets within the property despite evidence of the house being extensively cleaned, and several walls around the staircase being recently redecorated. Moreover, he was also unable to explain why traces of human fat and body tissue had been discovered within the drains of the property, with much of this material recovered within the section of the drains leading directly from the bathroom.

Throughout the several hours of questioning, Lancaster police repeatedly conversed with their Scottish counterparts, who had previously visited Ruxton's household to remove objects such as sections of wallpaper, carpeting, skirting boards, and silverware for a more detailed forensic examination at Glasgow University. In the early hours of 13 October, the finger and palm prints upon the second set of human hands discovered were found to be a match for impressions upon items Mary Jane Rogerson had habitually handled at Dalton Square. Upon hearing of this forensic match, Ruxton was formally charged with the murder of Mary Jane Rogerson at 7:20 am that morning. When Ruxton heard the recitation of the charge, he stated: "Most emphatically not! Of course not! The farthest thing from my mind! What motive and why? What are you talking about?" Following an appearance in custody of the Borough of Lancaster Police Court, situated on the ground floor of Lancaster Town Hall, Ruxton was remanded in custody.

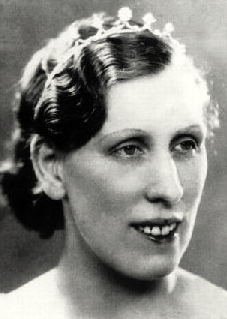
The studio portrait of Isabella Ruxton used by forensic scientists in efforts to identify her body

The forensic superimposition of Isabella's skull upon her life portrait

On 5 November Ruxton was further charged with the murder of his wife, whose remains were positively identified using the technique of forensic anthropology, in which an X-ray of a victim's skull was superimposed on a photograph taken of Isabella Ruxton in life. Professor James Couper Brash would later construct replica models of the two victims' left feet in a flexible gelatin-glycerin mixture; when placed in shoes the women had worn in life, the replica foot of the first victim recovered from the vicinity of the Annan River precisely fitted a shoe worn by Mary Jane Rogerson, whereas the replica foot of the second victim recovered precisely fitted shoes worn by Isabella Ruxton. (Note: A dentist named James Priestley would also positively identify dental work upon the teeth still located within the victims' heads to that he had performed upon both victims in life.)

== Trial ==
On 2 March 1936 the trial of Buck Ruxton opened at Manchester's High Court of Justice. He was tried before Mr Justice Singleton for the murder of Isabella Ruxton, and on this date chose to enter a formal plea of not guilty to the charge of murder. Following this formal plea, a jury was empanelled and sworn to duty.

The prosecutors at Ruxton's trial, Joseph Cooksey Jackson KC, David Maxwell Fyfe KC, and Hartley Shawcross contended that Ruxton, inflamed by jealousy and paranoia, had murdered Isabella Ruxton and Mary Jane Rogerson in the family household, and that he had then discarded their bodies more than 100 miles from Lancaster, in the Gardenholme Linn stream in the Southern Uplands of Scotland.

In his opening speech to the jury, Joseph Cooksey Jackson stated to the jury:

It does not need much imagination to suggest what probably happened in that house. It is very probable that Mary Jane Rogerson was a witness to the murder of Mrs. Ruxton, and that is why she met her death. You will hear that Mrs. Ruxton had received before her death violent blows in the face and that she was strangled. The suggestion of the prosecution is that her death and that of the girl Mary took place outside these rooms on the landing at the top of the staircase outside the maid's bedroom, because from that point down the staircase right into the bathroom there are trails of enormous quantities of blood. I suggest that when she went up to bed a violent quarrel took place; that he strangled his wife, and that Mary Jane Rogerson caught him in the act and had to die also. Mary's skull was fractured: she had some blows on the top of her head which would render her unconscious, and then was killed by some other means, probably a knife."

Ruxton's defence counsel, Norman Birkett KC (assisted by Philip Kershaw KC), based their defence upon their contention that the bodies had been misidentified, and that the two bodies were not those of Isabella Ruxton and Mary Jane Rogerson, but of two other unknown individuals, and that, as such, the evidence presented to the jury was flawed. Birkett and Kershaw further contended the bloodstains found upon the suit and carpeting Ruxton had given to the Hampshires, and located within his home following his arrest, had been innocently accrued throughout the years Ruxton had operated his practice.

=== Witness testimony ===
The prosecution called numerous witnesses to outline their case. Each witness to testify presented his findings to the court with the same patience and diligence he had used to determine his conclusions, and each was examined by a combination of Jackson, Shawcross and Fyfe; they would then be tirelessly cross-examined by either Birkett or Kershaw, who frequently seized on the slightest discrepancy in the evidence given, and frequently challenged assumptions made by medical and technical witnesses on each occasion an opportunity arose. Birkett also frequently offered his own conjecture as to how some evidence presented could have innocently accrued. For example, on one occasion, Birkett contended the blood found on the balustrade within 2 Dalton Square may have accidentally spilled there through either a birth, an abortion, or a woman's menstrual cycle occurring within the property.

Despite both defence counsel subjecting the numerous eyewitnesses, and the medical and forensic experts whom the prosecution introduced as witnesses, to intense cross-examination in an effort to challenge their findings, the vast majority of prosecution witnesses—including all medical and forensic personnel to testify—remained steadfast as to his conclusions regarding the identification of the victims, and that their murders had been committed by Ruxton at 2 Dalton Square. Nonetheless, Ruxton's defence counsel did occasionally succeed in getting a witness or expert to concede as to a possibility of an alternative explanation as to his or her findings, or recollections. (Note: Birkett and Kershaw did object to the prosecution submitting the superimposition of the photographs of Isabella Ruxton and her skull before the jury as inadmissible evidence on the grounds this was "constructed evidence and thus liable to human error". Nonetheless, this objection was overruled.)

=== Defence testimony ===
The sole witness to testify on behalf of the defence was Ruxton himself, who—upon the suggestion of his defence counsel—testified on the ninth day of the trial. Overall, he conducted himself poorly on the stand, being prone to bouts of hysterical sobbing as he clutched a silk handkerchief and hysterically claiming that he had last seen his wife when she had taken Mary Jane Rogerson to Edinburgh to discreetly arrange an abortion for her. He readily admitted to having frequently argued with his wife over her alleged infidelity and justified the mental and physical hardships to which he had occasionally subjected his wife by simply stating, "Who loves most, chastises most."

Despite this admission, Ruxton was insistent that both women would be found alive and further stated that if the actual identification of the bodies was correct, his "happy home" was now in tatters. He ardently denied the earlier testimony of various prosecution witnesses, whom he frequently accused of either lying or simply being mistaken, and frequently gave rambling, contradictory accounts of his own behaviour and actions prior to his arrest when questioned by both his own defence counsel and when subjected to cross-examination by the prosecution.

=== Closing arguments ===
The trial of Buck Ruxton lasted eleven days, with the majority of the testimony delivered being from eyewitnesses and from medical and forensic experts who testified on behalf of the prosecution. In his closing argument delivered on behalf of the prosecution, Joseph Cooksey Jackson summarised the testimony delivered by each of the medical and forensic experts regarding the painstaking identification of the victims, and how items used to conceal the remains could be traced to Dalton Square, including a section of luxury sheeting wrapped around several sections of the bodies that had been proven to precisely match the sheeting from the bed in the master bedroom at Dalton Square. (Note: A textiles expert had earlier testified at the trial that the pieces of sheeting wrapped around the bodies had a unique flaw in the threading, as had the sheeting in the master bedroom. This expert had stated that the flaw indicated that all the threading he had been asked to examine had originated from the same loom.) Outlining the inconsistencies in the accounts Ruxton had given to numerous individuals as to the whereabouts of his wife and maid, Jackson reminded the jury of the eyewitness testimony delivered by numerous individuals who had earlier testified, before turning to Ruxton's exhaustive efforts to destroy evidence and pacify Mary Jane Rogerson's parents as to their daughter's whereabouts in the weeks between the murders and his arrest. In reference to the actual motive for the murders, Jackson suggested the jury look no further than Ruxton's obsessive jealousy and violent temper.

In accordance with British legal tradition, Norman Birkett, having called his client to the stand, had entitled himself to make his closing argument on behalf of the defence after the prosecution address, as opposed to before the prosecution. In his closing argument delivered on 13 March 1936, Birkett reiterated the defence's case that, although the victims were indeed two women who had been murdered, the remains were not those of Isabella Ruxton and Mary Jane Rogerson, as the Crown had alleged they were, and that the idea that the motive for Isabella's death had been Ruxton's suspicions of his wife's infidelity was merely conjecture. Birkett further emphasised that, although some of the testimony delivered had allowed the possibility that the bodies were those of Ruxton's wife and family maid, these conclusions had been drawn in part from circumstantial evidence, and this evidence still did not prove Ruxton was the murderer. Birkett then emphasised that in any British murder trial, the burden is not upon the defence to prove innocence, but rather on the Crown to prove guilt.

Upon completion of both counsels' closing arguments, Mr Justice Singleton delivered his final instructions to the jury. This address lasted for several hours, and in reference to all evidence and testimony which had been presented at the trial, Singleton instructed the jury that Ruxton must be given the benefit of any reasonable doubt that may exist in their minds, adding: "If there is an avenue, let him walk down it to freedom, but if there is not, he cannot."

Following this final instruction from Mr Justice Singleton, the jury retired to consider their verdict.

== Conviction ==
Following the closing arguments and Judge Singleton's final instructions, the jury retired to consider their verdict; they would deliberate for just over one hour before returning a verdict of guilty against Ruxton. Consequently, Mr Justice Singleton sentenced Ruxton to death. When asked by Singleton if he had anything to say in response to the verdict and sentence, Ruxton responded by stating, "I am very sorry", before politely thanking the court for its patience and the fairness of his trial. Ruxton then informed the judge of his intentions to appeal the verdict.

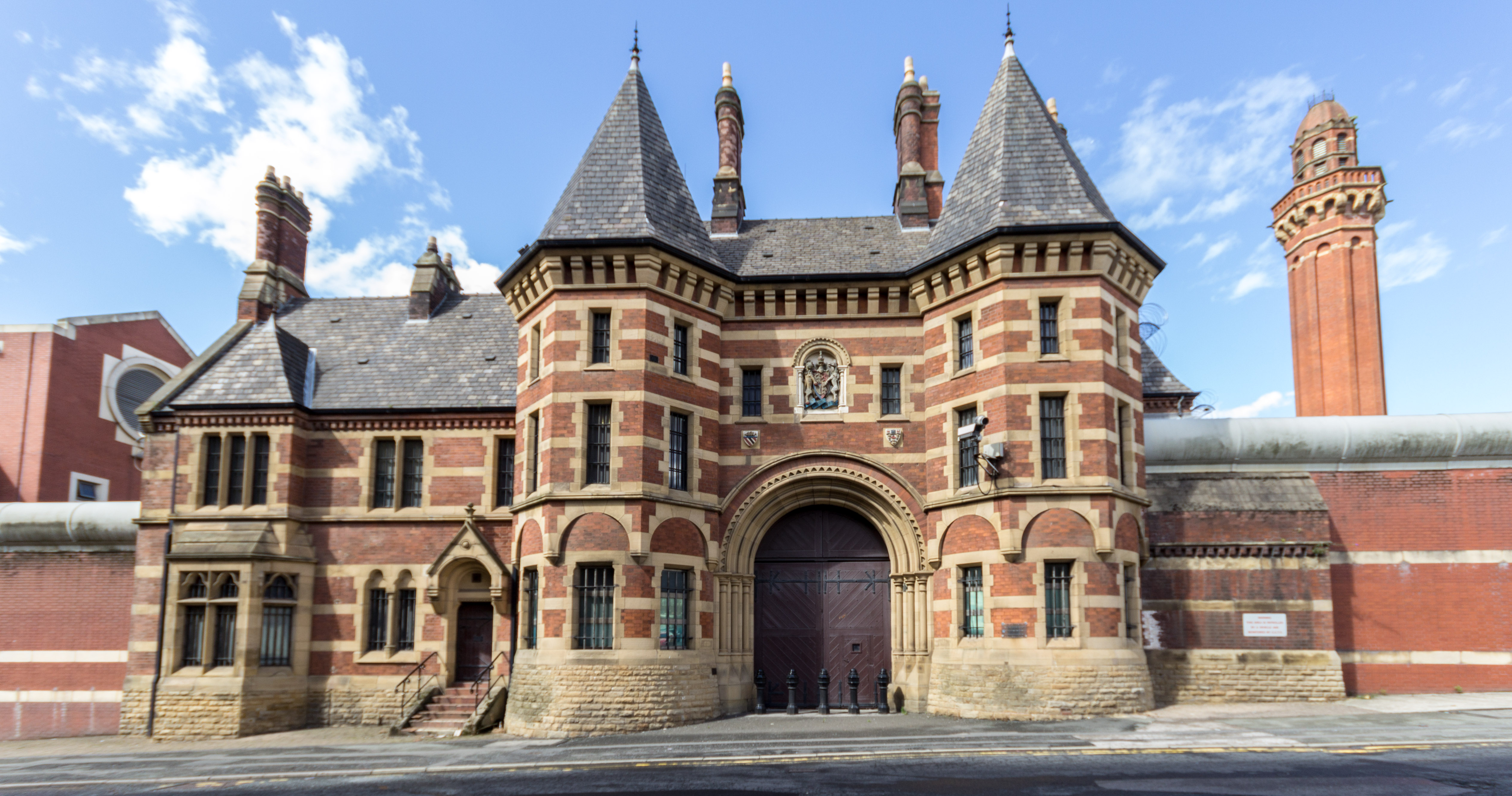
HM Prison Manchester. Ruxton was executed within the grounds of this prison on 12 May 1936.

=== Appeal ===
Ruxton did file an appeal against his conviction. In this appeal, Ruxton contended that in the judge's final instructions delivered to the jury, the jury had been urged to consider prosecution testimony pertaining to bloodstains found upon the suit Ruxton had given to the Hampshires which had been introduced as evidence, but that he had not instructed the jury to also consider the testimony also delivered by a prosecution witness who had conceded that the bloodstains upon the garment may have originated from completely innocent sources. Furthermore, the appeal stated that a forensic examination of his vehicle—contended by the prosecution to have been the vehicle used to transport the bodies—had revealed no traces of either mud or blood. Ruxton contended that the cumulative effect of all matters raised were tantamount to a substantial misdirection and that as such, the verdict should not be allowed to stand.

This appeal was heard at the Court of Criminal Appeal by the Lord Chief Justice (Lord Hewart), Mr Justice du Parq, and Mr Justice Goddard on 27 April 1936. The appeal was dismissed that same day as being "insufficient as to even remotely suggesting" any form of misdirection on the part of the judge at Ruxton's trial.

=== Execution ===
In the hours immediately prior to his execution, Buck Ruxton wrote a letter to his chief defence counsel, Norman Birkett KC. In this letter, Ruxton thanked Birkett for the skill in which he had conducted his defence, before stating: "I know that in a few hours I shall be going to meet my Maker. But I say to you, sir, I am entirely innocent of this crime."

Despite a petition from Lancaster residents urging clemency for Ruxton having collected over 10,000 signatures, he was hanged at HM Prison Manchester on the morning of 12 May 1936. His executioner was Albert Pierrepoint. (Note: Some sources name Ruxton's executioner as Albert Pierrepoint's uncle, Thomas Pierrepoint.)

== Aftermath ==
The day after Ruxton's execution, a Sunday newspaper published a brief handwritten confession, written by Ruxton the day after his arrest, and which he had instructed be opened only in the event of his execution, or returned to him should he be acquitted. In this confession, Ruxton admitted to killing his wife while in a state of jealous fury, only to be interrupted in the act by Mary Jane Rogerson, as a result of which he "had to [also] kill her".

"I killed Mrs Ruxton in a fit of temper because I thought she had been with a man. I was mad at the time. Mary Jane Rogerson was present at the time. I had to kill her."

— Buck Ruxton's brief confession to the murders, dated 14 October 1935 and published the day after his execution.

Despite intense police searches, the torso of Mary Jane Rogerson was never found, having likely flowed into the Solway Firth. The remains of her body actually recovered—excluding her skull—were buried in a churchyard in the village of Overton. (Note: Following their autopsies, the skulls of both Mary Jane Rogerson and Isabella Ruxton were retained by the University of Edinburgh—likely for future medical research. In 2024, the university issued a public appeal via the BBC to trace relatives of both women in order that their remains can be returned to loved ones, with a spokesperson for the university stating: "We want to do the right thing by Isabella and Mary and, if appropriate, return them to their families so they can be laid to rest.")

The area in and around Gardenholme Linn where Ruxton had disposed of the dismembered body parts of Isabella Ruxton and Mary Jane Rogerson would become colloquially known in and around Moffat as "Ruxton's Dump".

The house on Dalton Square where the murders were committed would remain vacant for decades. In the 1980s, the building underwent substantial internal renovation, particularly the bathroom, which would become architects' offices. The building itself remains non-residential. The bath in which Buck Ruxton dismembered his two victims was removed from the property to be used as evidence during his trial. The bath was later used as a horse trough by the mounted police division at Lancashire County Police headquarters, in the civil parish of Hutton, Lancashire, and is currently on display at the Lancashire Police Museum at Lancaster Castle.

Elizabeth, Diane and William Ruxton are believed to have been raised in an orphanage in the Wirral.

== Media ==
- The case of the "Bodies Under the Bridge" was dramatised by British radio scriptwriter and screenwriter Harry Alan Towers as part of the radio crime drama series, Secrets of Scotland Yard. This episode, entitled "Dr Ruxton Axe Killer", was first broadcast in approximately 1950.
- The American criminal justice television series American Justice broadcast an episode focusing on the murders committed by Buck Ruxton. Commissioned by the A&E Network, the episode focusing upon the Ruxton murders was first broadcast in December 2000.
- Catching History's Criminals, a BBC Four forensics series, broadcast an episode focusing on the case of Buck Ruxton. This episode, entitled "A Question of Identity", was first broadcast in June 2015.
- The first book exclusively devoted to the murders committed by Buck Ruxton, Medico-Legal Aspects of the Ruxton Case, was co-authored by John Glaister Jr., and James Couper Brash. This book was released in 1937 and focuses primarily on the innovative forensic techniques used both to identify the victims and identify the locations of their murder and dismemberment; thus ensuring the conviction of their murderer.

== See also ==
- Capital punishment in the United Kingdom
- Domestic violence
- HM Prison Manchester
- List of executioners

== Cited works and further reading ==
- Blundell, R. H.; Wilson, G. Haswell (1950) [1937]. Trial of Buck Ruxton. Glasgow: William Hodge & Co. ISBN 978-1-561-69181-4.
- Blundell, R. H.; Wilson; G. Haswell (1994) [1950]. James H. Hodge (ed.). Famous Trials III. Middlesex: Penguin Books. pp. 162–236. ISBN 978-0-140-00787-9.
- Byers, Steven N. (2016). Introduction to Forensic Anthropology. Boca Raton, Florida: Taylor & Francis Group. ISBN 978-1-138-18884-6.
- Craddock, Jeremy (2022) [2021]. The Jigsaw Murders: The True Story of the Ruxton Killings and the Birth of Modern Forensics. Cheltenham: The History Press. ISBN 978-0-750-99767-6.
- Evans, Colin (1996). The Casebook of Forensic Detection: How Science Solved 100 of the World's Most Baffling Crimes. New York City: John Wiley & Sons Inc. ISBN 978-0-471-07650-6.
- Evans, Colin; French, John L. (2009). Criminal Investigations: Crime Scene Investigations. New York City: Infobase Publishing. ISBN 978-0-791-0940-51.
- Fields, Kenneth (1998). Lancashire Magic & Mystery: Secrets of the Red Rose County. Wilmslow, Cheshire: Sigma Leisure. ISBN 978-1-850-58606-7.
- Fielding, Steven (2008). The Executioner's Bible. London: John Blake Publishing. ISBN 978-1-843-58696-8.
- Frasier, David K. (1996). Murder Cases of the Twentieth Century: Biographies and Bibliographies of 280 Convicted or Accused Killers. North Carolina: McFarland & Co. ISBN 978-1-476-60808-2.
- Glaister, John; Brash; James Couper (1937). Medico-Legal Aspects of the Ruxton Case. E & S Livingstone Ltd. ISBN 978-0-443-00690-6.
- Goff, M. Lee (2009). A Fly for the Prosecution: How Insect Evidence Helps Solve Crimes. Cambridge, Massachusetts: Harvard University Press. ISBN 978-0-674-03768-7.
- Hayes, Christopher (1995). "Vengeance of a Very Jealous Doctor". Ultimate Crimes (12). London, England: Nexus Media Limited: 28–34. ISSN 1358-8516.
- Innes, Brian (2000). Bodies of Evidence. London: Amber Books Ltd. pp. 82–83. ISBN 978-1-856-05623-6.
- Jessel, David; Wilson, Colin (1990). "The Savage Surgeon". Murder Casebook: Investigations into the Ultimate Crime. No. 48. London, England: Marshall Cavendish. ISBN 978-0-748-51448-9.
- Lane, Brian (1995) [1993]. Chronicle of 20th Century Murder. Wiltshire: Select Editions. ISBN 978-0-425-14649-1.
- Lane, Brian (1994) [1991]. The Butchers. Kettering: Index. ISBN 978-1-852-27297-5.
- Lane, Brian (1991). The Murder Guide to Great Britain. London: Robinson Publishing Ltd. ISBN 978-1-845-02937-1.
- McRery, Nigel (2013). Silent Witnesses: A History of Forensic Science. London: Random House Books. pp. 170–177. ISBN 978-1-847-94683-6.
- Moore, James (2018). Murder by Numbers: Fascinating Figures Behind the World's Worst Crimes. Cheltenham: History Press. ISBN 978-0-750-99207-7.
- Quigley, Christine (1996). The Corpse: A History. Lincoln: McFarland & Company. pp. 129–130. ISBN 978-0-786-42449-8.
- Ramsland, Katherine (2007). Inside the Minds of Healthcare Serial Killers: Why They Kill. Connecticut: Praeger Publishing. ISBN 978-0-275-99422-8.
- Ritchie, Jean (2020). Kiss of Death: True Cases of Fatal Attraction. London: Michael O'Mara Books. ISBN 978-1-789-29230-5.
- Root, Neil (2018). The Murder Gang: Fleet Street's Elite Group of Crime Reporters in the Golden Age of Tabloid Crime. Cheltenham: The History Press. ISBN 978-0-750-98721-9.
- Roth, Mitchel (2001). Historical Dictionary of Law Enforcement. Boston: Greenwood Publishing Group. ISBN 0-313-30560-9.
- Skelton, Douglas (2004). Bloody Valentine: Scotland's Crimes of Passion. Edinburgh: Black & White Publishing Ltd. ISBN 978-1-845-02004-0.
- Taylor, Karen (2000). Forensic Art and Illustration. Washington D.C.: CRC Press. ISBN 978-0-849-38118-8.
- Tilstone, William; Savage, Kathleen; Clark, Leigh (2006). Forensic Science: An Encyclopedia of History, Methods, and Techniques. Santa Barbara: ABC-CLIO. ISBN 978-1-576-07194-6.
- Trow, Meirion James (1994). The Wigwam Murder. London: Constable & Robinson. ISBN 978-0-094-72990-2.
- Whittington-Egan, Richard; Whittington-Egan, Molly (1992). The Murder Almanac. Glasgow: Neil Wilson Publishing Ltd. ISBN 978-1-897-78404-4.
- Wilson, Colin (1992). Murder in the 1930s. New York: Carroll & Graf Publishers Inc. pp. 244–249. ISBN 978-0-881-84855-7.
- Wood, Tom (2020). Ruxton: The First Modern Murder. Glasgow: Ringwood Publishing. ISBN 978-1-901-51484-1.
- Wynn, Douglas (1996). On Trial for Murder. London: Pan Books. pp. 187–188. ISBN 978-0-09-472990-2.
- Yount, Lisa (2007). Forensic Science: From Fibers to Fingerprints. New York City: Chelsea House Publishing. ISBN 978-1-604-13061-4.
