= Guy Frederic Marrian =

Professor Guy Frederic Marrian CBE FRS FRSE FIC
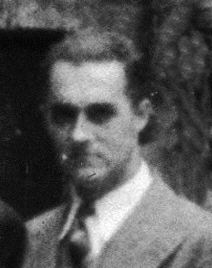
- Marrian in 1935.

Director of Research, Imperial Cancer Research Fund
- In office 1959–1968

Professor of Chemistry in Relation to Medicine, University of Edinburgh
- In office 1939–1959

Personal details
- Born: 3 March 1904 London, England
- Died: 24 July 1981 (aged 77) Canterbury, Kent, England
- Occupation: Biochemist

Guy Frederic Marrian (3 March 1904 – 24 July 1981) was a British biochemist mainly known for his research into oestrogen.

== Life ==
He was born in London on 3 March 1904 the son of Mary Eddington Currie and Frederic York Marrian, a civil engineer. He was educated at Tollington School for Boys in London then Leys School in Cambridge. He then studied Sciences at the University of London graduating with a BSc in 1925. He then went to work as a laboratory assistant to Dr Henry Dale at the National Institute of Medical Research in Hampstead.

In 1926 he began a postgraduate course at the University of London and gained his doctorate (DSc) in 1930. He then began lecturing in biochemistry. In 1933 he obtained a position as Assistant Professor of Biochemistry at the University of Toronto in Canada. In 1936 he was made full Professor. He planned to return to Britain in 1939 but this plan was disrupted by World War II.

During the war he was seconded to the Chemical Warfare Field Station in Alberta at the rank of Major. In 1945 he took up a post as Professor of Chemistry at the University of Edinburgh, lecturing mainly to medical students.

In October 1938 he delivered one of the Harvey Lectures of the Harvey Society of New York. In 1940 he was elected a Fellow of the Royal Society of Edinburgh. His proposers were James Pickering Kendall, James Ritchie, Sir Sydney Smith, and James Couper Brash. He was elected a Fellow of the Royal Society of London in 1944. In 1969 he was made Commander of the Order of the British Empire (CBE).

He retired in 1968, and died on 24 July 1981 in Canterbury.

== Family ==
In 1928 he married Phyllis May Lewis on the 5th of November. They had two daughters.
