= James Gemmell (disambiguation) =

James or Jimmy Gemmell may refer to:

- Jimmy Gemmell (1880-unknown), Scottish footballer for Sunderland, Stoke and Leeds City
- Jimmy Gemmell (footballer, born 1911) (1911–1992), English footballer for Bury and Southport
- James Gemmell (b. 1980), Canadian ice sledge hockey player

== See also ==
James Fairlie Gemmill
