= Mearns (surname) =

Mearns (/mɜːrnz/) is a Scottish surname. Notable people with the surname include:

- A. G. Mearns (1903–1968), Scottish physician and authority on public health
- Barbara Mearns (born 1955), Scottish naturalist and biographer
- Bill Mearns (1885–1948), Australian rules footballer
- Daniel Mearns (1838–1913), Scottish shipping merchant and Lord Provost of Aberdeen
- David Mearns (born 1958), United States-born marine scientist
- David C. Mearns (1899–1981), American librarian and scholar of Abraham Lincoln
- Duncan Mearns (1779–1852), Scottish minister
- Eddie Mearns (born 1989), Scottish footballer
- Edgar Alexander Mearns (1856–1916), American ornithologist and field naturalist
- Fillmore K. Mearns (1915–1997), United States Army lieutenant general
- Frederick Mearns (1879–1931), British footballer
- George Mearns (1922–1997), American basketball player
- Guy Mearns (born 1984 or 1985), British hard trance record producer
- Ian Mearns (born 1957), British Labour Party politician
- Levi R. Mearns (died 1896), American politician from Maryland
- Linda Mearns (1949–2025), American geographer and climate scientist
- Randy Mearns (born 1969), Canadian lacrosse player
- Raymond Mearns (born 1967), Scottish actor and comedian
- Robert Mearns (1866–1949), U.S. Army general
- Sara Mearns (born 1986), American ballet dancer
- William Hughes Mearns (1875–1965), American educator and poet
