= James Frederic Riley =

20th-century English physician

James Frederic Riley FRSE FRCSE (2 May 1912–17 January 1985) was a 20th-century English physician, radiologist and cancer specialist. His identification (working jointly with Dr Geoffrey West) that the mast cell was the main producer of histamine in the human body resulted in his being made a visiting professor at the University of Montreal and to his being awarded the Claude Bernard Medal for medical achievement. He was one of the first to identify the link between mast cells and asthma and the potential use of antihistamines in this field.

== Life ==
He was born in Settle, Yorkshire on 2 May 1912. He was educated at Giggleswick School in Yorkshire.

He studied medicine at the University of Edinburgh, graduating with an MB ChB in 1935. In 1938 he was elected a Fellow of the Royal College of Surgeons of Edinburgh. In the Second World War he served as Assistant Surgeon to the Scottish Emergency Medical Service, and for the final year served at the rank of Major with the OC Mobile Surgical Unit in India and Malaysia. Returning to Edinburgh he received his doctorate (MD) in 1946. However, despite intentions to be a surgeon, a skin complaint on his hands prevented his being a surgeon, and he instead retrained as a radiologist, with particular interest in the use of x-rays in cancer treatment.

In 1948 he took on the role of Consultant Radiologist at Dundee Royal Infirmary. In 1950 he took on the additional role of Reader in Radiotherapy at the University of St Andrews Medical School in Dundee, which became part of Queens College Dundee in 1954 and from 1967 was part of the new University of Dundee. Riley retained the post of Reader until 1975, and was a research fellow at the University of Dundee from then until 1977. Much of his research at Dundee was devoted to the mast cell and this led to his discovery of the origins of histamine.

In 1958 he received a second doctorate (PhD), from the University of St Andrews. In 1968 he was elected a Fellow of the Royal Society of Edinburgh. His proposers were George H Bell, Rex Coupland, Ian George Wilson Hill and James Ernest Richey.

He retired in 1976, and died in St Andrews on 17 January 1985.

== Recognition and legacy ==
In 2015 Dundee erected a plaque to his memory as part of the city's "Discovery Walk". His personal papers are held by Archive Services at the University of Dundee. Much of his original laboratory equipment is held by the Tayside Medical History Museum at Ninewells Hospital. His papers are held by Archive Services at the University of Dundee. Riley had an interest in railways and these papers include a number of railway photographs.

== Publications ==
- Experiments in Carcinogenesis 1939-1944 (1946)
- Skin Histamine: its Location in the Tissue Mast cells (1956)
