= Mostly Murder =

1959 autobiography by Sydney Smith

- Author: Sir Sydney Smith
- Language: English
- Genre: Autobiography
- Publisher: David McKay Co., New York
- Publication date: 1959 (1st edition)
- Media type: Print
- Pages: 318

Mostly Murder is the 1959 autobiography of forensic pathologist Sir Sydney Smith.

== Background ==
The book is a memoir about the most notorious crimes Smith solved in his career, which extended across the United Kingdom, New Zealand, Australia, Egypt and Sri Lanka.

The book has run through many British and American editions and has been translated into several languages.

== Selected cases ==
- Hopetoun quarry murder (1913)
  Conviction of Patrick Higgins of Winchburgh for the double homicide of his two children and dumping their bodies in the quarry, which resulted in Scotland's first execution of the twentieth century.
- Assassination of Governor-General Sirdar (1924)
  Apprehension of the assassins of British Governor-General of Anglo-Egyptian Sudan Major-General Lee Stack, who was mortally shot while driving through Cairo.
- Sidney Fox matricide trial (1929)
  Unraveling of the plot and subsequent conviction of career swindler Sidney Harry Fox for the murder of his mother.
- Annie Hearn arsenic trial (1931)
  The highly controversial Annie Hearn arsenic poisoning accusation where the defense came up with scientific evidence which overrode the prosecution's circumstantial evidence.
- Strangulation of Chrissie Gall: suicide or homicide? (1931)
  The repudiation of expert opinion and highly controversial wrongful conviction of Peter Queen for the murder of Chrissie Gall.
- Sydney shark case (1935)
  The bizarre case of a 12-foot shark regurgitating a severed human arm in an Australian aquarium, and the subsequent investigation determining both victim and the cause of death.
- Ruxton double murder (1935)
  Establishing the precedent of forensic skull-to-face superimposition, and conviction of Dr. Buck Ruxton for the double homicide, mutilation and dismemberment of his wife Isabella Kerr-Ruxton and their family housemaid Mary Jane Rogerson.
- Capturing the Falkirk burglar (1937)
  Apprehension of the Falkirk burglar through pioneering the field of forensic podiatry.
- Acquittal of Mahadevan Sathasivam (1951)
  Acquittal of Sri Lankan cricketer Mahadevan Sathasivam of the murder of his wife Paripoornam Ananda Rajendra, and the conviction of servant Hewa Marambage William.
