= William Arthur Harland =

Northern-Irish forensic scientist (1926–1985)

Professor William Arthur Harland FRSE FRCPath FRCPGlas FRCPC

Regius Professor of Forensic Medicine, University of Glasgow
- In office 1974–1985

Personal details
- Born: 7 March 1926 Belfast, Northern Ireland
- Died: 9 January 1985 (aged 58)

William Arthur Harland (7 March 1926 – 9 January 1985) was a Belfast-born physician. After a lifetime of international roles he became Regius Professor of Forensic Medicine at Glasgow University and then Dean of the Faculty of Law. He appeared as an expert witness in many British trials. He was also an expert in atherosclerosis and thyroid disease. He was one of the persons to introduce radiocarbon dating into forensic science.

== Life ==
He was born on 7 March 1926, at 7 Ulsterville Avenue in Belfast, the son of Robert Wallace Harland and Elizabeth Montgomery Robb. He studied at Methodist College Belfast and graduated in 1948 from Queen's University, Belfast with a MB ChB in Medicine.

Soon after marrying he moved to Canada. From 1955 he was director of laboratories at St Joseph's Hospital in Chatham, Ontario. In 1958 he moved to Montreal as assistant pathologist in the Jewish General Hospital. In 1960 he moved to the Caribbean as senior lecturer at the University of the West Indies. In 1964 he returned to Britain with his young family to teach at the Atheroma Resident Unit in Glasgow. In 1966 he became senior lecturer in pathology at Glasgow University. Only in 1974 did he receive a doctorate (MD), at the point of his being raised to professor of forensic medicine. He was promoted to dean in 1980 serving until 1983 but continuing as professor until death.

In 1980 he was elected a Fellow of the Royal Society of Edinburgh. His proposers were Robert Goudie, John R Anderson, Martin Smellie and Robert Alexander Rankin.

From 1964 he lived in the family home at Kilmacolm west of Glasgow.

== Personal life ==
In 1953, Harland married Brenda Foxcroft (b.1930). They had four children: June Elizabeth Harland, William Montgomery Harland, John Paul Harland, and Richard Duncan Harland.

On 9 January 1985, Harland died.

== Publications ==
- The Thyroid Gland in Jamaica (1964)
- Thyroid Hormone Metabolism (1975)
