= Johnson Symington =

British anatomist and zoologist

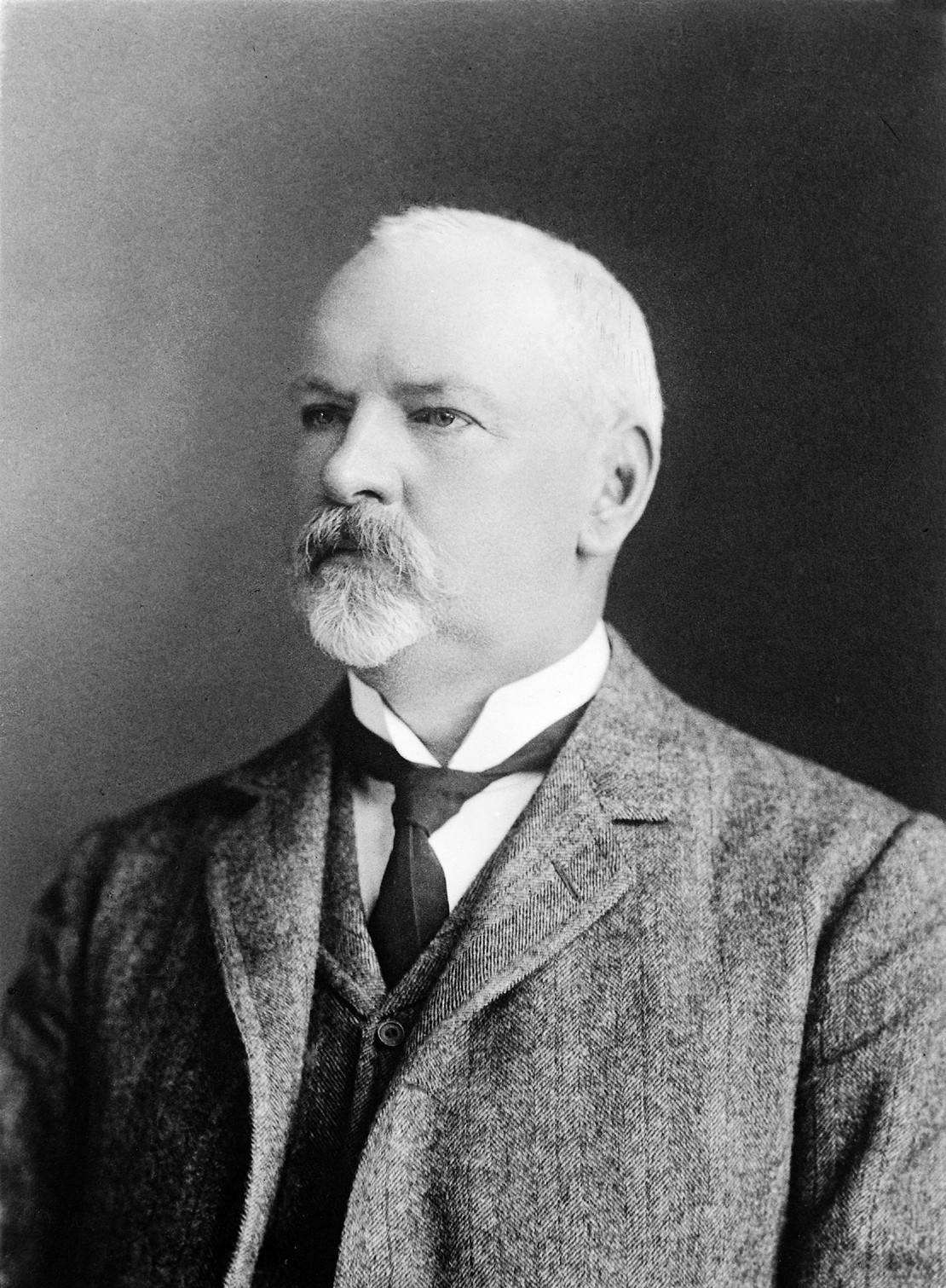
Johnson Symington

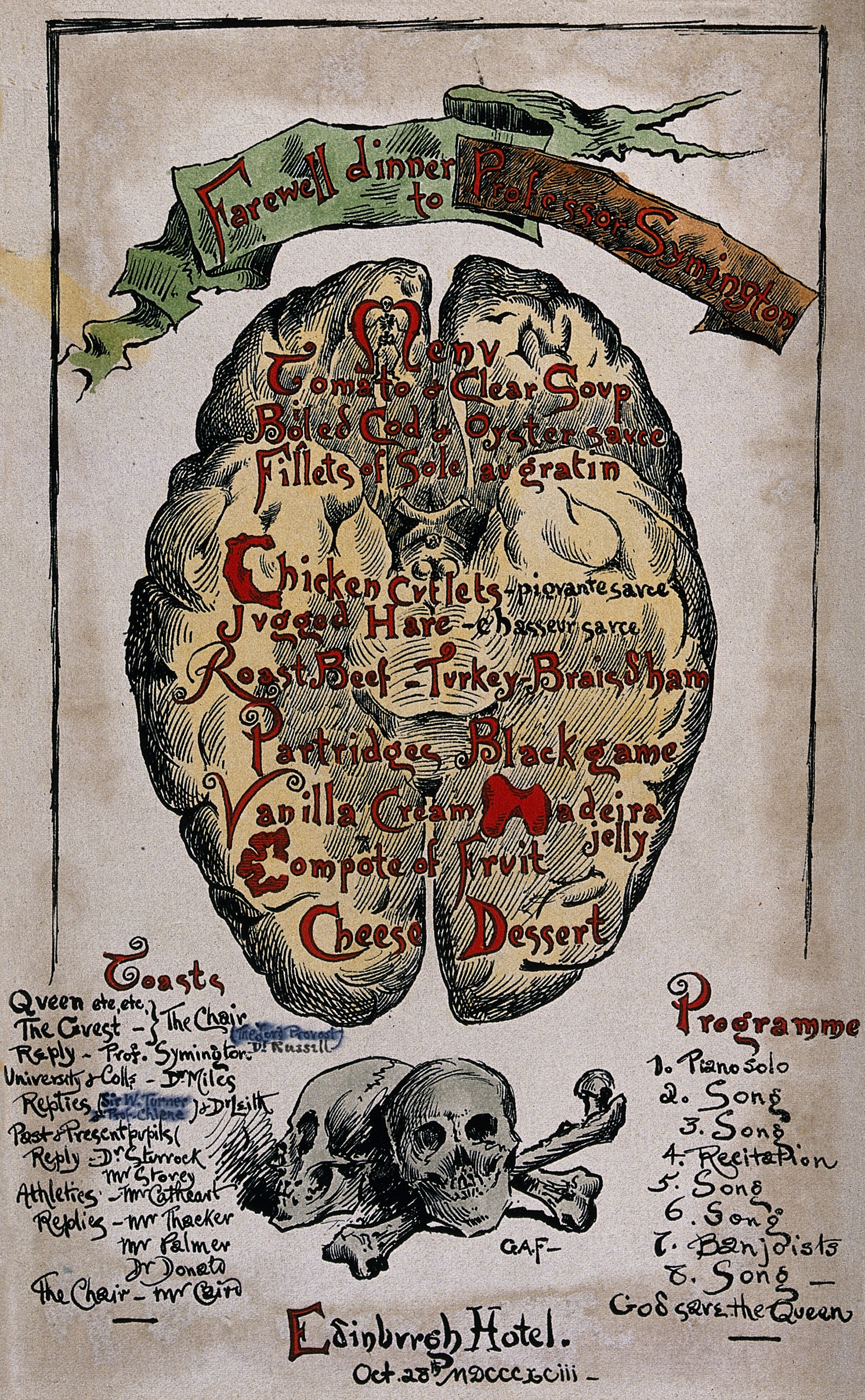
The macabre illustrated menu card for the farewell dinner to Professor Johnson Symington from the University of Edinburghin 1893

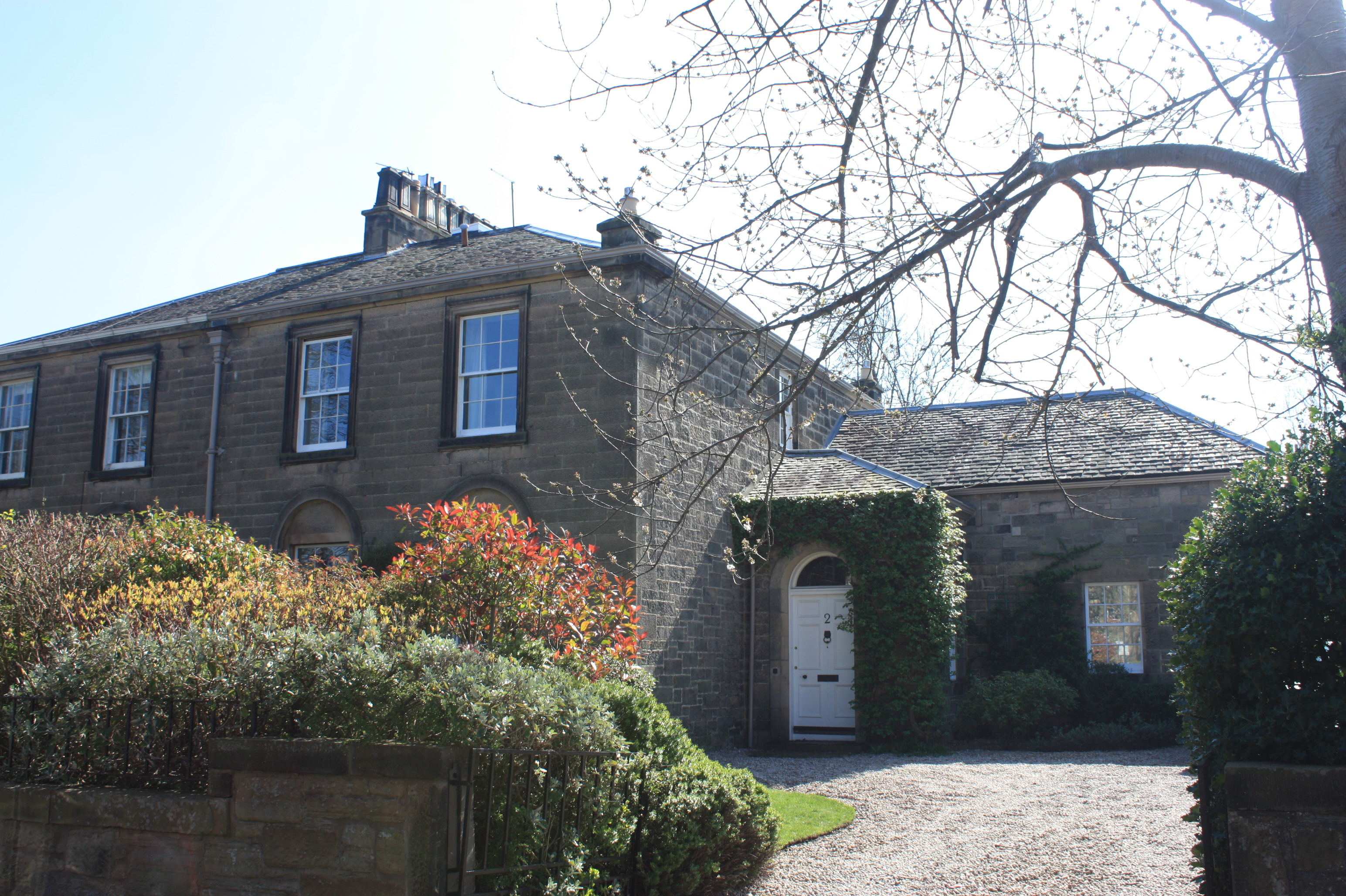
Symington's house at 2 Greenhill Park, Edinburgh

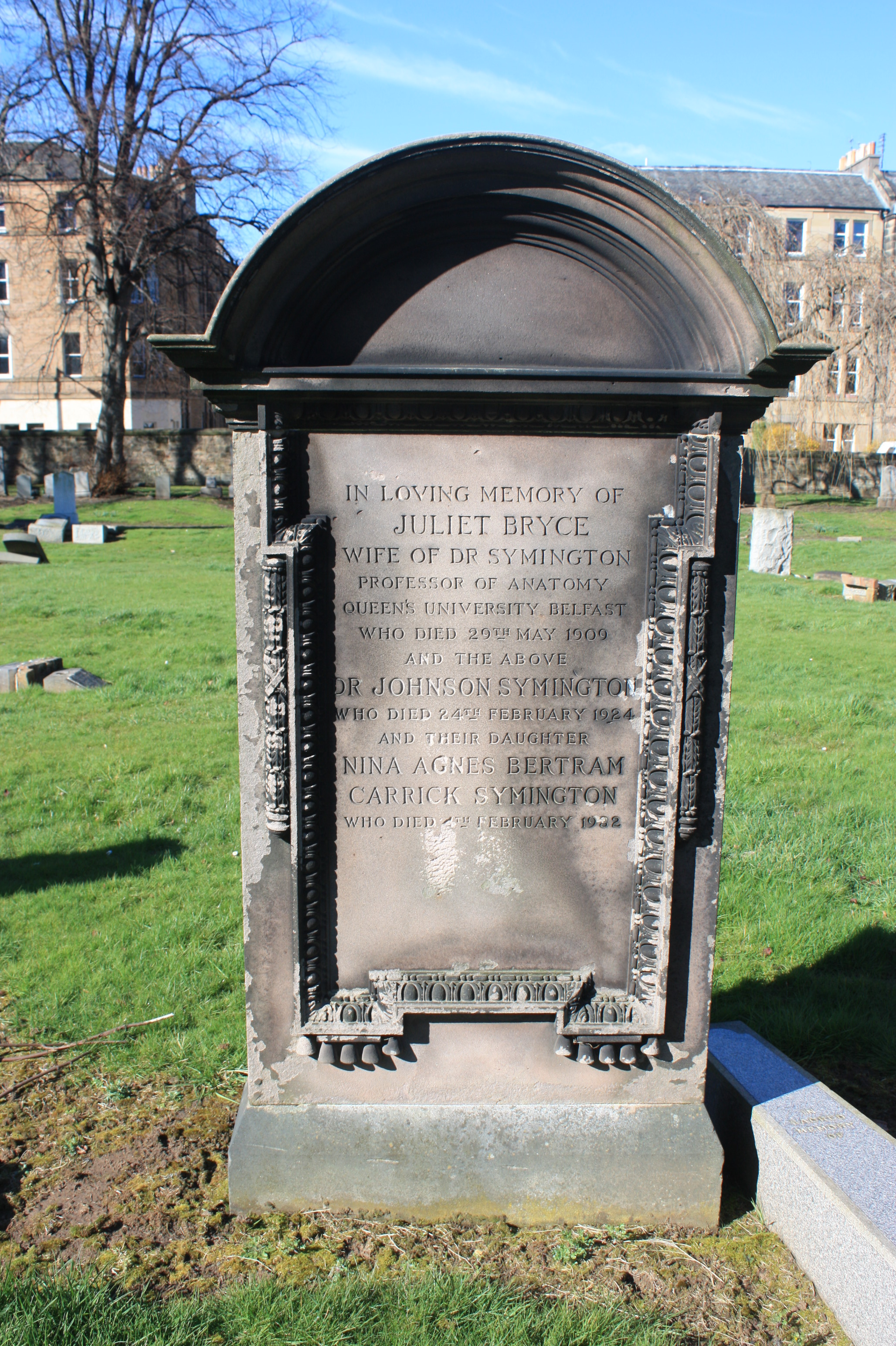
The grave of Johnson Symington, Morningside Cemetery, Edinburgh

Johnson Symington FRS FRSE FZS LLD (1851–1924) was a British anatomist and zoologist. He was President of the Ulster Medical Society for 1896/7. He served as President of the Anatomical Society of Great Britain and Ireland 1904 to 1906. He is noted for his comparative studies of the brain of modern man and prehistoric man, and of man and other primates. From 1923 onwards Queen's University Belfast award a Symington Prize every year to junior anatomists in his honour.

== Life ==
He was born on 8 September 1851 in Taunton in Somerset. He studied medicine at the University of Edinburgh and graduated with an MB ChB in 1877. As was then common, he became a demonstrator in the anatomy lectures, dissecting as the lecturer spoke. In 1879 he was promoted to a lecturer himself. He lectured from Minto House on Chambers Street. While in Edinburgh he lived at “Falconburg Lodge”, 2 Greenhill Park.

He received his MD in 1885 and was elected a Fellow of the Royal Society of Edinburgh in the same year. His proposers were Sir William Turner, Ramsay Heatley Traquair, John Duncan and Robert Gray. He was elected a Fellow of the Royal Society of London in 1903.

In 1893 he accepted the post of Professor of Anatomy at Queen's College, Belfast, replacing Prof Peter Redfern. In 1901 he also became Registrar of the College. In 1907/8 he was one of the seven commissioners elevating the college to university status under the Irish University Act 1908. The college gave him an honorary doctorate (LLD) on his retiral in 1918 due to illness, at which point he returned to live in Edinburgh. He was replaced at Queen's by Thomas Walmsley.

He died on 24 February 1924. He is buried with his wife and daughter in Morningside Cemetery, Edinburgh. His grave lies near the centre of the northern half.

== Family ==
He was married to Juliet Bryce (died 1909).

== Publications ==
- The Topographical Anatomy of the Child (1887)
- The Cerebral Convultions in the Primates (1894)
- The Cerebral Commisures of Non-Placental Mammals (1894) (Monotremes and Marsupials)
- The Marsupial Larynx (1899)
- Atlas of Skiagrams (1908)
- Joint editor of Quain's Anatomy (1908/9)
- Splanchnology (1914)
- Atlas of Topographical Anatomy (1917)
