= George Alexander Pirie =

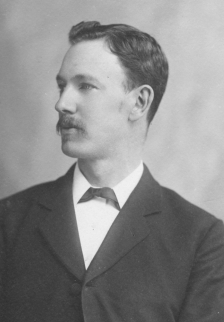
George Alexander Pirie c.1890

George Alexander Pirie (1863 – 27 October 1929) was a Scottish medical doctor and pioneering researcher in the use of X-rays in clinical medicine.

== Early life ==
George Alexander Pirie was born in Dundee where his father, Dr George Clark Pirie, was a physician at the Dundee Royal Infirmary from 1862 to 1881. The family lived at 43 South Tay Street in Dundee.

Pirie graduated with an MA from the University of St. Andrews, and then studied medicine at the University of Edinburgh, graduating with an MB ChM with first-class honours in 1886 and an MD in 1890.

== Career ==
In 1887 he started work at Edinburgh Royal Infirmary as a resident under Scottish physician Sir Thomas Grainger Stewart, before moving to Dundee. Pirie worked at the Dundee Royal Infirmary from 1896 to 1925, and was an early pioneer in the application of X-rays to clinical medicine. He began experimenting with radiology, radiography, and X-rays in 1896, soon after the Wilhelm Röntgen had first demonstrated X-rays and their potential in Germany. Pirie established the first Electrical Department at Dundee Royal Infirmary in 1896. The Tayside Medical History Museum at the University of Dundee holds a number of examples of X-ray equipment used by Pirie, including early X-ray tubes, fluoroscope, his protective face mask and a bottle of mustard oil which Pirie used on his hands after they became damaged by radiation. In 1925 he retired from Dundee Royal Infirmary due to ill-health.

== Later life ==
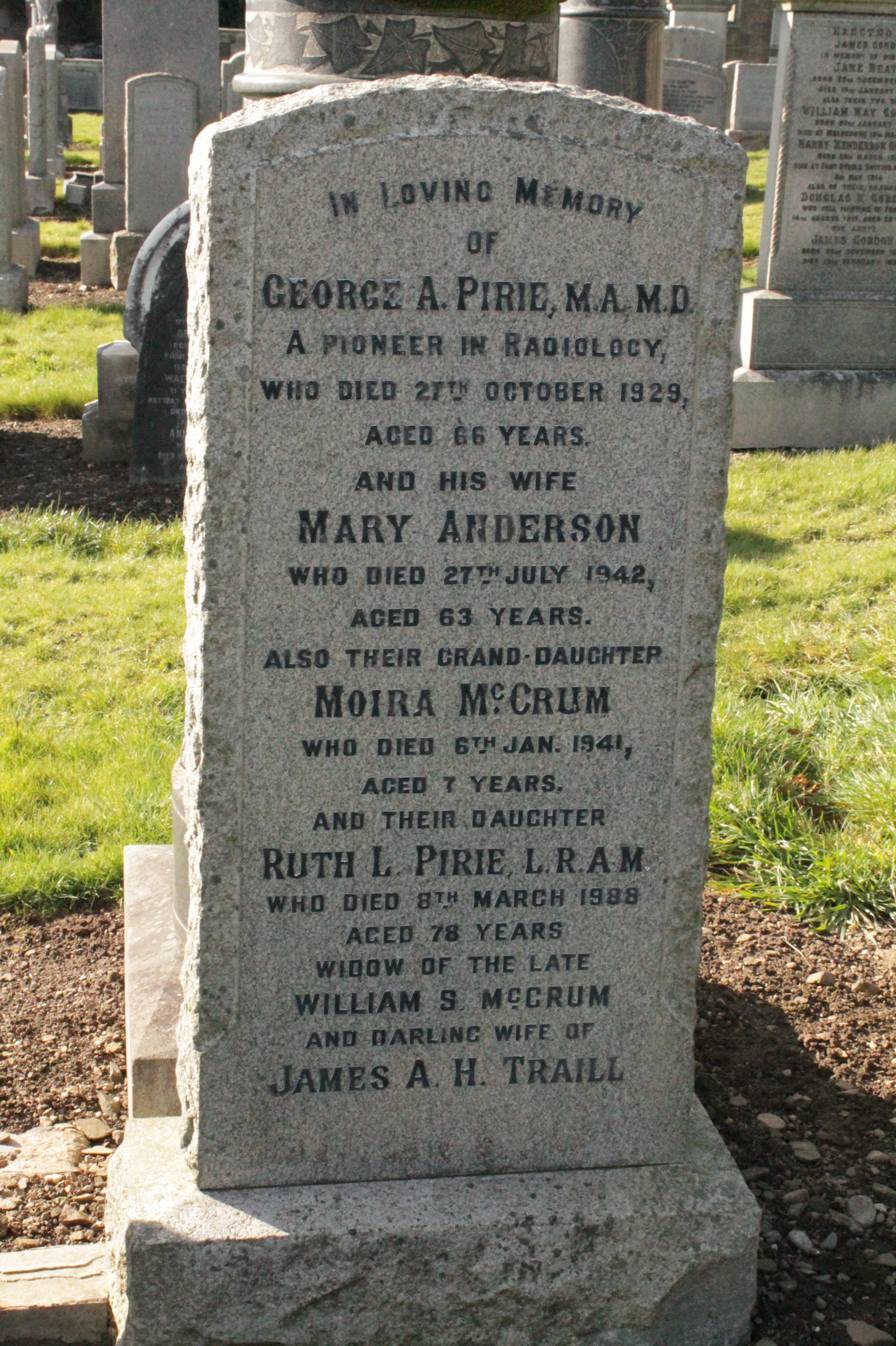
The grave of George Alexander Pirie, Western Cemetery, Dundee

From 1905, Pirie had begun to suffer from hand problems and by 1925 had had to give up work due to the damage caused to his hands and eyes through exposure to radiation during his work with x-rays. By 1926 he had lost the sight in one eye, had much reduced vision in the other, and had had both of his hands amputated due to radiation related tumours. One of Pirie's hands is held at the Pathology department of Dundee's Ninewells Hospital. In 1926 the Carnegie Hero Trust awarded him their bronze medal and £200 per year, and he was granted a Civil List pension of £75. In 1926 he was also given £1200 which had been raised by the people of Dundee in recognition of his work there and his subsequent health problems. He died in Dundee on 27 October 1929 aged 66. He is buried in the Western Cemetery, Dundee. The grave lies on the central path on the main upper terrace.

== Family ==
He was married to Mary Anderson (1880-1942). Their daughters Kathleen Winifred Pirie (1905 -1991) married James George Wade Wilson and Ruth L. Pirie LRAM (1909-1988) married William McCrum then James A H Traill.

== Memorials ==
Pirie was one of 14 Britons among the 169 X-ray pioneers from 15 nations honoured at the Monument to the X-ray and Radium Martyrs of All Nations unveiled in Hamburg in 1936 to commemorate those researchers who had died or been injured as a result of their X-ray related work. It has the inscription: "They were heroic pioneers for a safe and successful application of X-rays to medicine. The fame of their deeds is immortal." In 2007 the Scottish Radiological Society donated £3,000 towards a bronze plaque commemorating Pirie planned for on Dundee's Discovery Walk.

George Pirie Way in the Ninewells Hospital site in Dundee is named after him.
