= A. G. Mearns =

Scottish physician and public health expert

Alexander Gow Mearns FRSE MBE (1903–1968) was a Scottish physician and public health expert. He was one of the first people in forensic science to use insect activity to determine the time of death. In authorship he is referred to as A. G. Mearns.

== Life ==
He is thought to be the son of Robert Mearns, a lawyer living at Ythan Bank in Pollokshaws in Glasgow.

He studied medicine at Glasgow University graduating BSc in 1925 and MB ChB in 1926 and a diploma in public health in 1929. He lectured in public health at Glasgow University.

Developing his own ideas within the fledgling science of forensic anthropology he worked with Prof John Glaister on the prosecution case of the murderer Dr Buck Ruxton in 1936. His evidence was one of the world's first to use the development of certain maggots within a corpse to determine the date of death.

In 1941 he was elected a Fellow of the Royal Society of Edinburgh. His proposers were John Glaister, Edward Hindle, John Walton and George Walter Tyrell.

In the New Years Honours List of 1956 he was created a Member of the Order of the British Empire (MBE).

He died in Glasgow on 6 January 1968.

== Publications ==
- The Whole Child (1961)
- Hygiene Manual of Public Health (with J R Currie) (1948)
