= Hamish Watson (paediatrician) =

Scottish paediatrician

Hamish Watson FRCPE FRCP FACC
- Born: 26 June 1923; Edinburgh, Scotland
- Died: 23 May 2001 (aged 77)
- Education: University of Edinburgh
- Known for: Being an authority on Ebstein's anomaly. Pioneer of cardiac catheterisation
- Spouse: Lesley Wood
- Awards: FRCP
- Scientific career
- Fields: Pediatrics
- Workplaces: Royal Infirmary of Edinburgh, Dundee Royal Infirmary

Hamish Watson (26 June 1923 – 23 May 2001) was a Scottish paediatrician who was a pioneer in paediatric cardiac catheterisation. Watson was most notable for being an authority on the congenital heart defect, Ebstein's anomaly.

== Early life ==
Hamish Watson was born in Edinburgh to dairy owner John T R Watson and his wife, Annie Ewing Spence. He was educated at George Watson's School before studying medicine at the University of Edinburgh, from where he graduated with an MB ChB and an MD in 1945.

In 1951, he married Lesley Wood and had two daughters and a son.

== Career ==
Following his graduation, Watson spent his national service in Africa as RMO, Nigeria Regiment. Watson returned to Edinburgh with a small collection of animals bound for the zoo. His medical career continued at the Royal Infirmary of Edinburgh where he was strongly influenced by cardiologist Andrew Rae Gilchrist, who established the cardiology department at the Infirmary. Two years later, Watson moved to St Andrews University Department of Medicine under Sir Ian Hill, working in Dundee hospitals. Watson's early research was in the field of anticoagulant therapy but the tragic death of his young son from severe congenital heart disease, provided the impetus for him to undertake pioneering research work in congenital heart disease in children. From this, Watson developed a diagnostic and treatment technique that involved the insertion of narrow tubes into the heart – cardiac catheterisation. Watson went on to establish the first coronary care unit in Tayside and was appointed both Post-graduate Dean at the University of Dundee and head of the Cardiology Department at Dundee Royal Infirmary. Watson was editor of the 1968 multi-authored book, Paediatric Cardiology which became a standard text for students. Watson was influential in the establishment of the European Association of Paediatric Cardiologists, becoming its first president. In 1960 he was elected a member of the Harveian Society of Edinburgh and in 1976 was elected a member of the Aesculapian club. Watson was also a Fellow of the American College of Cardiology, and in 1987, joint chairman of the British Cardiac Society and a trustee of the Royal College of Physicians of Edinburgh.

== Later life ==
Following his retirement, Watson pursued his love of the great outdoors, hunting and fishing regularly. He was a joint Master of Fox Hounds and, like his wife, an expert fly fisher. The Watsons were also keen gardeners. A car accident brought this outdoors lifestyle to an abrupt halt however, leaving Watson paralysed and in great pain. He was nursed by his wife and died in 2001, at the age of 77, from pneumonia in the coronary care unit he had helped establish.

== Bibliography ==
- Paediatric cardiology, Hamish Watson. London, Lloyd-Luke. 1968
- Clinical anatomy of the heart, Robert Walmsley; Hamish Watson. Edinburgh; New York : Churchill Livingstone; New York : Distributed by Longman. 1978
