= Thomas Walmsley (anatomist) =

Scottish anatomist

Thomas Walmsley FRSE (1889–1951) was a 20th-century Scottish anatomist who became professor of anatomy at Queen's University, Belfast.

== Life ==
He was born in Bombay in India the first son of Thomas Walmsley, a Scottish officer in the Royal Indian Navy. The family returned to Greenock in Scotland in his youth (around 1899), living at 59 South Street. His father is then listed as a "marine engineer". He was educated at Greenock Academy.

He studied medicine at Glasgow University graduating MB ChB in 1912. He was first employed as a demonstrator in the anatomy classes under Prof Thomas Hastie Bryce. In 1914 he took on the additional role as house surgeon at Glasgow Western Infirmary under Sir William Macewen. At the university he began lecturing in surgery. He received his doctorate (MD) in 1916, also receiving the Bellahouston Gold Medal for his thesis on joints. He then replaced James Fairlie Gemmill as lecturer in anatomy and embryology at the university.

In 1919 at the relatively youthful age of 30 he was appointed professor of anatomy at Queen's University, Belfast, replacing Prof Johnson Symington.

In 1920 he was elected a Fellow of the Royal Society of Edinburgh. His proposers were Thomas Hastie Bryce, Diarmid Noel Paton, Frederick Orpen Bower, and Robert Muir. In 1929, he published his classic anatomical monograph The Heart as Vol IV (Part III) of Quain's Elements of Anatomy.

At Queen's, he developed its first science degree in anatomy (B.Sc.), combining morphology with embryology, neuroanatomy and anthropological approaches.

He retired due to ill-health in 1950 and was succeeded by John Joseph Pritchard.

He died at his home in Armagh following a long struggle with stomach cancer on 12 November 1951 aged 62.

== Family ==
He was married to Denzil Kirk (sic). They had one son and one daughter.

He was older brother to Robert Walmsley who held a similar position at St Andrews University.

== Publications ==
- A Manual of Practical Anatomy London: Longmans Green. 3 vols (1918) (second edition 1934).
- "The Heart" - Quain's Elements of Anatomy, Vol IV part III (1929) London: Longmans Green.
