= Thomas J. Mackie =

Scottish bacteriologist

Thomas Jones Mackie CBE FRSE LLD (5 June 1888 – 6 October 1955) was a noted Scottish bacteriologist; Dean of the Faculty of Medicine, University of Edinburgh; and author of medical research textbooks.

== Life ==
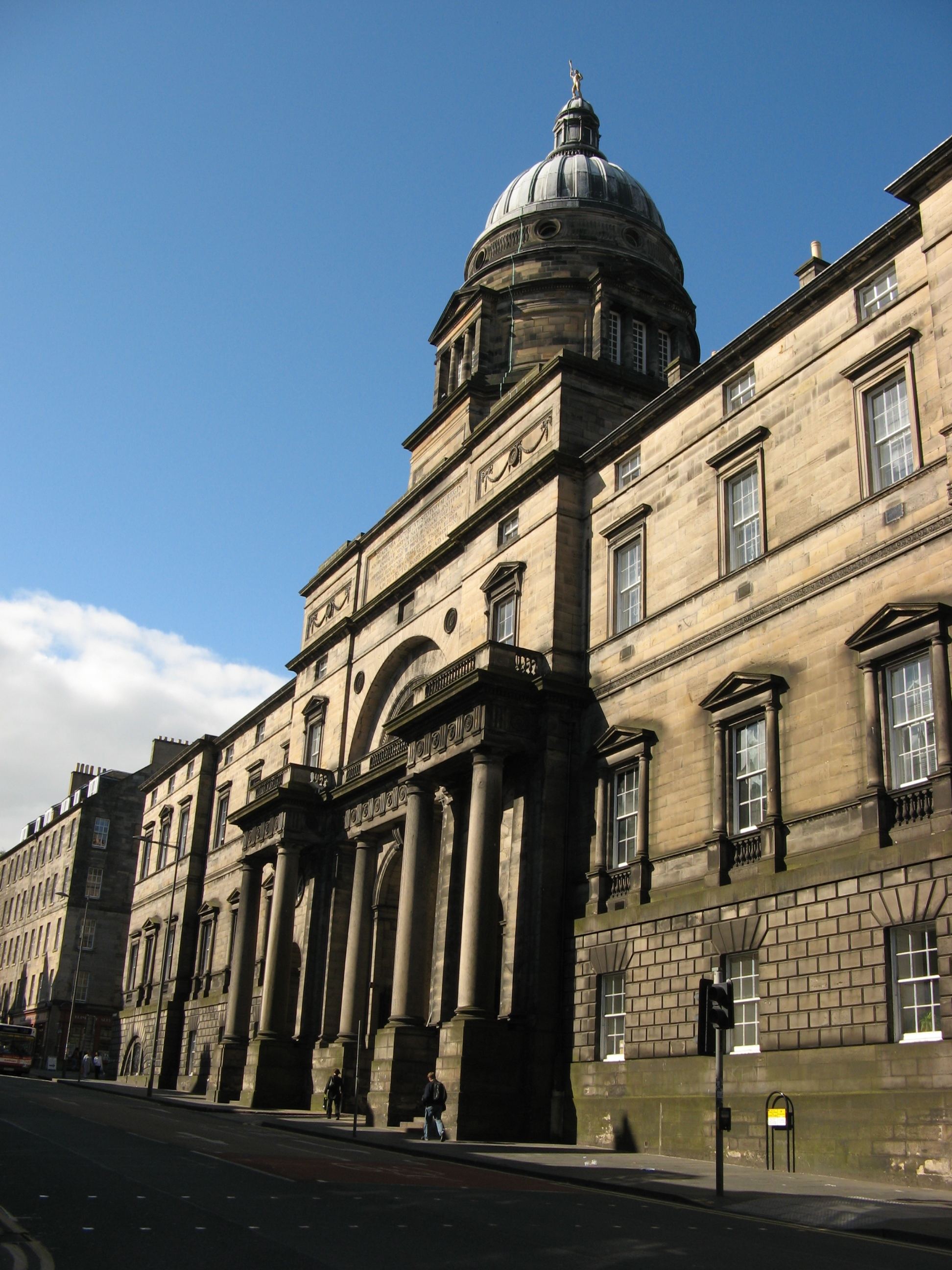
University of Edinburgh Old College

He was born in Hamilton, South Lanarkshire, Scotland, the son of James Mackie.

He received his education at the Hamilton Academy from which he attended the University of Glasgow, graduating MB, Ch.B with honours in 1910 and being awarded the Brunton Memorial Prize as the most distinguished student of his year.

Following posts as house-surgeon and house-physician in Glasgow Western Infirmary Mackie attained a Carnegie Scholarship in the department of pathology, attracted to the laboratory by Professor Sir Robert Muir. Taking the Oxford D.P.H., he worked as an assistant in the Bland-Sutton Institute of Pathology at the Middlesex Hospital until, on outbreak of the First World War in 1914, as a Territorial he was attached to the RAMC (Royal Army Medical Corps) as an officer, serving mainly in the Middle East, and was appointed to the command of the Central Bacteriological Laboratory in Alexandria, Egypt, this leading in 1918 to his appointment to the Werner-Beit chair of bacteriology in the University of Cape Town, South Africa.

In 1923, Mackie was offered the chair of bacteriology in the University of Edinburgh, a post he held for the next 32 years during which he also co-authored, A Handbook of Bacteriology (1938) (with J. E. McCartney) and A Textbook of Bacteriology (eleventh edition, 1949) (with C. H. Browning).

In 1926, he was elected a member of the Harveian Society of Edinburgh. In 1928, he was elected a Fellow of the Royal Society of Edinburgh. His proposers were Sir James Alfred Ewing, George Barger, Francis Gibson Baily, and James Hartley Ashworth.

Mackie served as an advisor to many organisations, including appointments as honorary bacteriologist and senior consultant in Bacteriology, and member of the Board of Management Royal Infirmary of Edinburgh; member of the South-eastern Regional Hospital Board; council member, the Lister Institute of Preventive Medicine; and member of the Scientific Advisory Committee of the Department of Health for Scotland (and chairman of the Infectious Diseases Subcommittee).

Closely involved in the development of the laboratory service in Scotland, at the beginning of World War II the Central Military Laboratory was based in his own department at the University of Edinburgh. Mackie served as a member of the Agricultural Research Council; director of the Animal Diseases Research Association (Scotland); and as chairman of the Scottish Hill Farm Research Committee and as an examiner for the University of Aberdeen; University of St Andrews; University of Glasgow; University of Durham and the University of Sheffield.

In recognition of his work, Mackie was appointed CBE in 1942 and, in 1947, an honorary degree of Doctor of Laws was conferred on him by the University of Glasgow. He was also a Corresponding Member of the Royal Academy of Medicine of Rome; a Member of the Royal College of Physicians of Edinburgh and a Fellow of the Royal Society of Edinburgh.

In 1953, Professor Mackie succeeded Sir Sydney Smith (forensic expert) as Dean of the Faculty of Medicine in the University of Edinburgh.

== Death ==
Professor Mackie died at Edinburgh on 6 October 1955.

== Family ==
He was married to Edith Warner.
