= Regius Professor of Forensic Medicine (Glasgow) =

The Regius Chair of Forensic Medicine at the University of Glasgow was founded in 1839 by Queen Victoria.

The chair was occupied for over one sixty years by the same family, when John Glaister Jnr. succeeded his father as Regius Professor. The chair is currently vacant.

== Regius Professors of Forensic Medicine ==
- 1839 - Robert Cowan
- 1841 - Harry Rainy
- 1872 - Pierce Adolphus Simpson
- 1898 - John Glaister
- 1931 - John Glaister Jnr
- 1964 - Gilbert Forbes
- 1974 - William Arthur Harland
- 1985 - Alan Albert Watson
- 1993 - Peter Vanezis

== See also ==
- List of Professorships at the University of Glasgow
- University of Glasgow Medical School
