= Douglas Skelton =

Scottish writer

Douglas Skelton is a Scottish writer of crime fiction and non-fiction.

== Biography ==
Skelton was born in Glasgow. Before turning to writing full-time, he had been a bank clerk, tax officer, shelf stacker, meat porter, taxi driver, reporter, investigator and editor. While his non-fiction charts the true life exploits of murderers, criminals and cause celebres, his fiction settings are invariably set in his home town of Glasgow or the windswept Scottish highlands.

In August 2025, Skelton was a guest on the Off the Shelf podcast as part of a feature on the McIlvanney Prize.

== Bibliography ==
=== Non-fiction ===
- 1992 — Blood on the Thistle
- 1992 — Frightener
- 1994 — No Final Solution
- 2003 — Deadlier than the Male
- 2004 — My Bloody Valentine
- 2005 — Indian Peter
- 2008 — Dark Heart
- 2009 — Glasgow's Black Heart
- 2017 — Scotland (Amazing and Extraordinary Facts)

=== Fiction ===
- 2013 — Blood City — Davie McCall
- 2014 — Crow Bait — Davie McCall
- 2015 — Devil's Knock — Davie McCall
- 2016 — Open Wounds — Davie McCall
- 2017 — Tag - You're Dead — Dominic Queste
- 2018 — The Janus Run — Coleman Lang
- 2019 — Thunder Bay — Rebecca Connolly #1
- 2020 — The Blood is Still — Rebecca Connolly #2
- 2021 — A Rattle of Bones — Rebecca Connolly #3
- 2022 — Where Demons Hide — Rebecca Connolly #4
- 2022 — An Honourable Thief — Jonas Flynt
- 2023 — A Thief's Justice — Jonas Flynt #2
