= James Couper Brash =

British anatomist and embryologist (1886–1958)

- Born: 24 October 1886; Cathcart
- Died: 19 January 1958 (aged 71); Edinburgh
- Occupation: Anatomist

James Couper Brash, MC, FRCSE, FRSE (24 October 1886 in Cathcart – 19 January 1958 in Edinburgh) was a leading anatomist and embryologist in Britain.

== Early life and family ==
James Couper Brash was born in Cathcart in Scotland, the son of James Brash, J.P. He was educated at George Watson's College and the University of Edinburgh. Brash graduated B.Sc. in 1908 and M.B., Ch.B. in 1910.

In 1912 Brash married Margaret Henderson, daughter of William Henderson, of Leslie, Fife, and she survived him together with one son, James Couper Henderson Brash (d.1990) and one daughter, Nancy Brash. Neither had children, ending the line.

== Career ==
After holding the post of resident physician at the Royal Infirmary and working as a demonstrator of anatomy at Edinburgh, he became an assistant in the anatomical department in the University of Leeds.

During the First World War he served as a Major in the Royal Army Medical Corps in France and Belgium and was awarded the Military Cross for his bravery.

Soon after his return to civilian life he was appointed assistant professor of anatomy at Birmingham University, becoming professor in 1922 and, later, dean of the medical faculty. In 1923 the university granted him the degree of M.D. In 1931 he returned to Edinburgh as successor to Professor A. Robinson in the chair of anatomy, he was assisted by Robert Walmsley.

Professor Brash had already become recognized as one of the leading anatomists in Britain. His own research was concerned mainly with embryology and the development of the jaws and teeth, on which he wrote several monographs for the Dental Board of the United Kingdom. With Professor J. Glaister he was the author of a book entitled Medico-Legal Aspects of the Ruxton Case, the trial of Buck Ruxton. He, also took over from Professor Robinson the editing of Cunningham's Manual of Practical Anatomy and Cunningham's Textbook of Anatomy. In 1947, he was elected to the Aesculapian Club of Edinburgh.

== Retirement & death ==
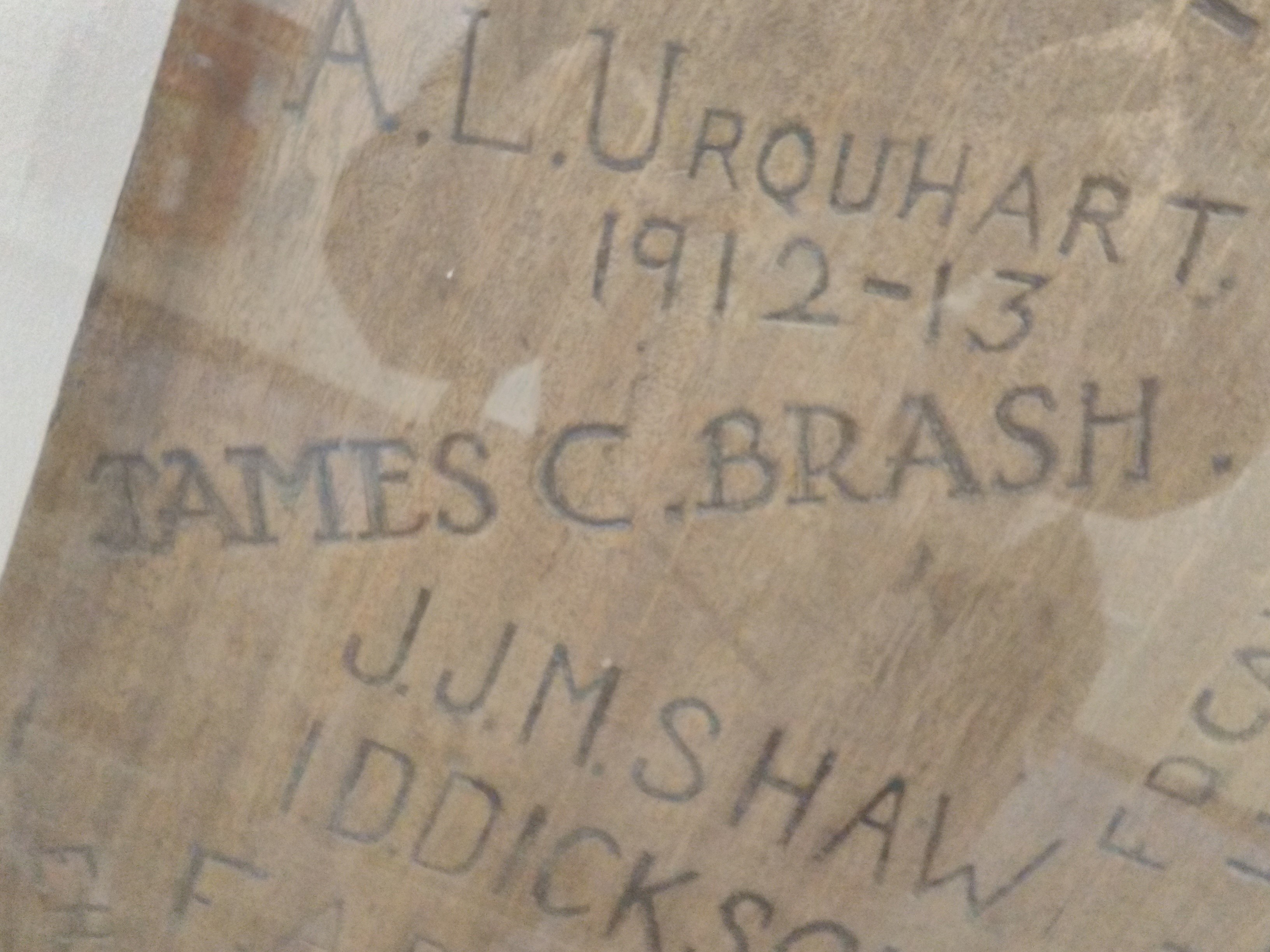
James Couper Brash's name carved on the preserved doctors table at ERI

Professor Brash, who retired from the chair of anatomy at Edinburgh in 1954, received many distinctions during his career as a research worker and teacher. He was a past-president of the Anatomical Society of Great Britain and Ireland (1945–1947); he was an examiner in anatomy at Cambridge and other universities; at the Annual Meeting of the B.M.A. in 1922 he was vice-president of the Section of Anatomy at the Royal College of Surgeons of Edinburgh, of which he was elected a Fellow in 1932, he was Struthers lecturer from the University of Leeds he received the honorary D.Sc. and from the University of St. Andrews the honorary LL.D. and he was an honorary member of the British Dental Association.

Professor Brash died suddenly at his home in Edinburgh on 19 January 1958 at 71 years of age.

== Memorials ==
Brash's name is one of the names inscribed (by his own hand) on the preserved doctors table from the old Edinburgh Royal Infirmary, now at the new ERI at Little France in south Edinburgh.

== Publications ==
see

- The Growth of the Jaws and Palate (1924)
- The Aetiology of Irregularity and Malocclusion of the Teeth (1929)
- Medico-Legal Aspects of the Ruxton Case (1937)
- Neuro-vascular Hila of Limb Muscles (1955)
