= Sydney Smith (pathologist) =

British pathologist

Sir Sydney Smith CBE OPR FRSE
- Born: August 4, 1883; Roxburgh, New Zealand
- Died: May 8, 1969 (aged 85); Edinburgh, Scotland
- Education: University of Edinburgh
- Medical career
- Profession: Pathologist
- Sub-specialties: Forensic pathology Medical jurisprudence Medical law

Sir Sydney Alfred Smith CBE OPR FRSE (4 August 1883 – 8 May 1969), was a forensic scientist, pathologist and one of the pre-eminent medico-legal specialists in the world. From 1928 to 1953, Smith was Regius Professor of Forensic Medicine at the University of Edinburgh, a well-known forensic department of that time. Smith's iconic 1959 autobiography Mostly Murder has run through many British and American editions and has been translated into several other languages.

== Life ==
Smith was born at Roxburgh, Otago, in New Zealand. He was son of James Jackson Smith and Mary Elizabeth Wilkinson.

He was educated at Roxburgh public school, and Victoria College, Wellington. He later won a Vans Dunlop scholarship to study botany and zoology at the University of Edinburgh. He transferred to medicine and graduated with an MB ChB in 1912, with first-class honours, and then undertook a research scholarship, receiving a Diploma in Public Health (DPH) in 1913.

Following a short period in general practice, Smith became an assistant in at the University of Edinburgh department of forensic medicine at the suggestion of Professor Henry Harvey Littlejohn. He obtained his doctorate (MD) in 1914 with a gold medal, and also won the Alison Prize.

Smith returned to New Zealand in 1914 and took up a post as Medical Officer of Health for Otago at Dunedin. During World War I, Smith served as a major in the New Zealand Army Corps. In 1917, Smith took up a post as medico-legal advisor to the Government of Egypt and senior lecturer in forensic medicine at the School of Medicine in Cairo. Smith went on to establish himself as an authority in the field of ballistics and firearms in forensic medicine, publishing the first edition of Textbook of Forensic Medicine in 1925.

In 1928, Smith was appointed to the Regius Chair of forensic medicine at the University of Edinburgh. In 1929 he was elected a Fellow of the Royal Society of Edinburgh. His proposers were Sir Edmund Taylor Whittaker, Ralph Allan Sampson, Thomas James Jehu and James Ritchie. In 1930 he was elected a member of the Harveian Society of Edinburgh.

In 1931 he became Dean of the Faculty of Medicine, a post he held until 1953 (succeeded by Professor Thomas J Mackie). During his period as Dean, in response to Polish medical students seeking refuge in Scotland, he was prominent in the discussions which led to the creation of the Polish School of Medicine in Edinburgh in 1941. He was awarded the Order of Polonia Restituta (OPR) by the Polish government after the war. The school was disbanded in 1949.

In 1946, Smith was elected to the Aesculapian Club of Edinburgh. He was Acting University Principal of Edinburgh University 1948-1949 on the death in office of John Fraser. Smith was Rector of the University of Edinburgh from 1954 to 1957. He sat on the General Medical Council continuously for 25 years. He published an autobiography, Mostly Murder, in 1959.

In King's Birthday Honours 1944 Smith was appointed as a Commander of the Most Excellent Order of the British Empire. In the New Year Honours 1949 Smith was appointed as a Knight Bachelor and invested by King George VI on 4 March 1949. In 1955 the University of Edinburgh gave him an honorary doctorate (LLD) for his literary works.

He died on 8 May 1969 at his house "Rhycullen" in Edinburgh.

== Artistic recognition ==
He was portrayed in office as Dean by William Oliphant Hutchison.

== Family ==
In 1912 he married Catherine Goodsir Gelenick (d.1962). Their daughter, Catherine Mary Goodsir Smith, became a doctor and their son was the poet, artist and art critic Sydney Goodsir Smith.

== Cases ==
Smith's first important forensic case was the 1913 trial of Patrick Higgins for the murder of his two sons in Winchburgh, Scotland, known as the Hopetoun Quarry murders. Because of the build-up of adipocere in the bodies, a result of their being immersed in a cold flooded quarry, Littlejohn and Smith were able to provide important evidence in the trial, leading to the conviction and execution of Higgins. The two scientists' famous work gained notoriety 94 years later, when a relative of the boys asked for the return of specimens taken from their remains from the University of Edinburgh, for a proper burial. Research revealed that after their work on the case, Littlejohn and Smith had removed parts of the bodies from police custody to use as scientific specimens, as described in Smith's autobiography, according to Chris Paton in The Scotsman. In January 2008, the university agreed to return the remains, if the claimant could establish her relationship and the other relatives all agreed.

Working in Egypt in 1924, Smith used pioneering techniques of forensic ballistics to identify the assassins of Lee Stack.

In 1935, Smith was one of the forensic experts involved in the identification of the bodies of the victims of Buck Ruxton, using a novel technique of forensic anthropology to superimpose a photograph over the X-ray of a victim's skull.

Also in 1935, while on holiday in Australia, he was called to give evidence in the infamous Shark Arm case.

In 1937, Smith produced a profile of the Falkirk cat burglar, using a pair of shoes, predating the field of forensic podiatry.

One obituary of Smith recounted an incident in which he was brought "three small bones thought to belong to an animal", and from these was able to determine that they belonged to "a woman aged between 23 and 25 who had died three months earlier. She had at least one pregnancy, walked with a limp and was killed by a home-made shotgun slug".

== Notes ==
Academic offices
Preceded by Alexander Fleming	Rector of the University of Edinburgh; 1954–1957	Succeeded by James Robertson Justice
