= Ian Hill (cardiologist) =

Scottish physician

Professor Sir Ian Hill CBE TD FRSE FRCPE FRCP

Honorary Physician to HM The Queen in Scotland
- In office 1956–1970

Professor of Medicine, University of Dundee
- In office 1967–1969

Professor of Medicine, University of St Andrews
- In office 1950–1967

Personal details
- Born: Ian George Wilson Hill; 7 September 1904 Shotts, Lanarkshire, Scotland
- Died: 5 May 1982 (aged 77) Crail, Fife, Scotland
- Occupation: Cardiologist

Sir Ian George Wilson Hill (7 September 1904 – 5 May 1982) was a Scottish physician. He was President of the Royal College of Physicians of Edinburgh from 1963 to 1966 and the official Physician to the Queen in Scotland. He was Chairman of the British Cardiac Society.

== Life ==
Hill was born in Shotts, Lanarkshire, the son of Jean Robertson Malcolm and Alexander Wilson Hill, a banker. His early years were spent in South Uist where he acquired a love of nature and fly-fishing in particular. His family then moved to Edinburgh where he was educated at George Watson's College. He studied medicine at the University of Edinburgh under Edward Albert Sharpey-Schafer and William Thomas Ritchie, graduating MB ChB with honours in 1928, and winning the Ettles Scholarship for that year, plus a Rockefeller Travelling Scholarship. With the latter he travelled to Ann Arbor, Michigan to work with the leading electrocardiologist Frank N. Wilson. He then spent time in Vienna working with Karl Wenckebach, where his fluent German proved invaluable. In 1931 the University of Edinburgh awarded Hill the Gunning Victoria Jubilee Prize for his essay, “Certain operative procedures on the neck considered from a cardiological standpoint”.

In 1933, he began lecturing in medicine at the University of Aberdeen under Sir Stanley Davidson, moving to the University of Edinburgh in 1937 to lecture in therapeutics under Derrick Dunlop. His career was disrupted by the Second World War, and as a Territorial Army volunteer his call-up was immediate at the onset of war. He served in the Middle East, Burma and India, rising to the rank of Brigadier by 1945. He was Consultant Physician to the 14th Army and the Allied Land Forces in SE Asia. He was awarded a Commander of the Order of the British Empire (CBE) for his wartime services.

He returned to Scotland in 1947 as Assistant Physician in the Edinburgh Royal Infirmary, simultaneously acting as Consultant Physician at the Deaconess Hospital. He also had a lucrative private consultancy. Despite this he returned to academia in 1950, accepting the position as Professor of Medicine at the University of St Andrews (based in Dundee), replacing Professor Adam Patrick, and later the University of Dundee following that institutions split from St Andrews in 1967. In 1948 he had been elected a Fellow of the Royal Society of Edinburgh. His proposers were David Murray Lyon, Douglas Guthrie, William Frederick Harvey and Sir Ernest Wedderburn.

In 1932 he was elected a member of the Harveian Society of Edinburgh and served as President in 1960. In 1963 he was elected a member of the Aesculapian Club. He was knighted by Queen Elizabeth II in 1966. He retired from the University of Dundee in 1969. The University awarded him an honorary doctorate (LLD) in 1970, just after his retiral.

He continued to work, acting as visiting professor in the University of Teheran in Iran and Dean of the Faculty of Medicine at the Haile Selassie I University in Ethiopia.

He died at home on 5 May 1982 at Priors Croft, Nethergate in Crail, Fife.

== Family ==
He married twice: in 1933 to Ellen Audrey Lavender (d.1966), a nurse he met at Edinburgh Royal Infirmary, who became Lady Hill, and in 1968 to Anna Hill. He had a daughter and son by his first marriage. His son Alastair Hill OBE became a QC.

== Archives ==
Archive Services at the University of Dundee hold Professor Hill's papers.
