= Ashludie Hospital =

- NHS Tayside
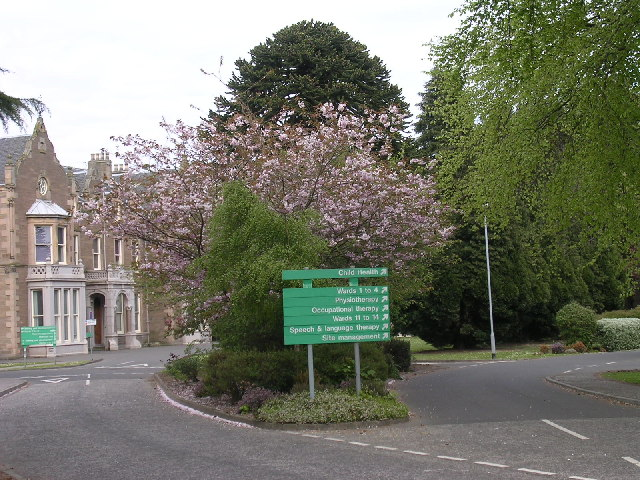
- Ashludie Hospital

- Shown in Angus

Geography
- Location: Victoria Street, Monifieth, Scotland
- Coordinates: 56.4887°N 2.8210°W

Organisation
- Care system: NHS Scotland
- Type: Specialist

Services
- Speciality: Geriatric hospital

History
- Founded: 1913
- Closed: 2013

Links
- Lists: Hospitals in Scotland

Ashludie Hospital was a health facility in Victoria Street, Monifieth, Angus, Scotland. It was managed by NHS Tayside. It remains a Category B listed building.

== History ==
Ashludie House was commissioned by Alexander Gordon, a flax spinning manufacturer. It was designed by James Maclaren in the Jacobean style and completed in 1865. After Gordon died, it was converted for clinical use and re-opened as Ashludie Sanatorium in 1916. After joining the National Health Service in 1948, it became a geriatric hospital. Following the transfer of services to Ninewells Hospital in Dundee, Ashludie Hospital closed in 2013. The main building has since been converted into apartments and the rest of the site has been developed for residential use.
