= Carseview Centre =

- NHS Tayside
- Shown in Dundee

Geography
- Location: Dundee, Tayside, Scotland
- Coordinates: 56.4634°N 3.0453°W

Organisation
- Care system: NHS Scotland

Services
- Emergency department: No

History
- Founded: 2001

The Carseview Centre is a mental health unit in the grounds of Ninewells Hospital in Dundee, Scotland. It is located on Tom McDonald Avenue, named after the former Lord Provost of Dundee, and takes its name from the location overlooking the Carse of Gowrie. It is managed by NHS Tayside.

== History ==
The centre, which was built at a cost of £10 million as an adult acute in-patient care centre for the Dundee area, opened in July 2001. It took over some of the functions of Royal Dundee Liff Hospital and originally had had 74 beds but this then reduced to 66 beds by March 2014. The centre was the subject of a BBC Scotland documentary, Breaking Point, broadcast in July 2018.
