= St Margaret's Hospital =

St Margaret's Hospital may refer to:

- St Margaret's Hospital, Auchterarder, Scotland
- St Margaret's Hospital, Epping, England
- St Margaret's Hospital, Sydney, Australia
- UPMC St. Margaret, Aspinwall, Pennsylvania, United States
