= Forfar Infirmary =

- NHS Tayside
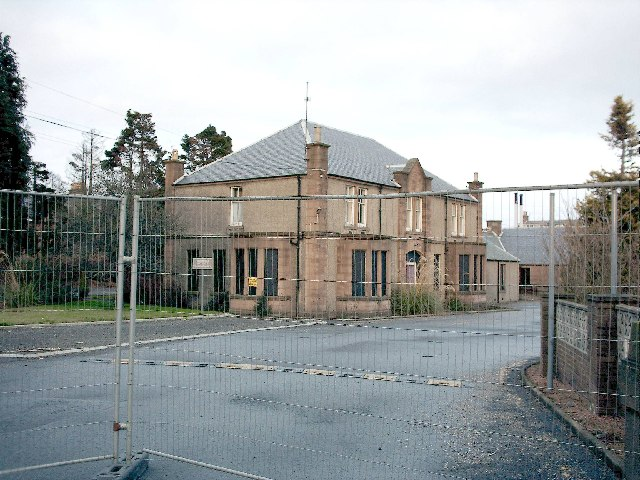
- Forfar Infirmary

- Shown in Angus

Geography
- Location: Arbroath Road, Forfar, Scotland
- Coordinates: 56.6455°N 2.8760°W

Organisation
- Care system: NHS Scotland
- Type: General

History
- Founded: 1862
- Closed: 2005

Links
- Lists: Hospitals in Scotland

Forfar Infirmary was a health facility in Arbroath Road in Forfar, Angus, Scotland. It was managed by NHS Tayside.

== History ==
The facility had its origins in the Forfar Poorhouse which was completed in June 1861. The infirmary, which was designed to serve the local community as well as the poorhouse, opened on a nearby site in July 1862. Two wings were added in 1922 and a nurses' home was built in 1927 before it joined the National Health Service in 1948. After services had transferred to Whitehills Hospital, Forfar Infirmary closed in 2005 and the buildings were subsequently demolished.
