= Elizabeth Haldane =

Scottish writer, suffragist and social welfare worker

Elizabeth Sanderson Haldane LLD
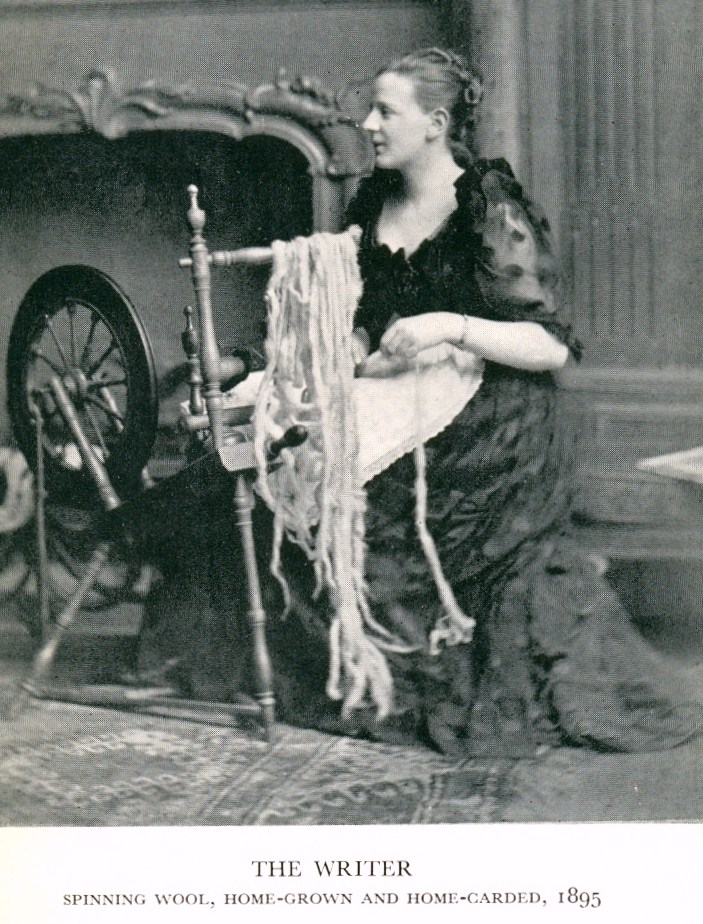
- Taken from the frontispiece of her autobiography 'From One Century to Another'.
- Born: 27 May 1862; Edinburgh, Scotland
- Died: 24 December 1937 (aged 75); St Margaret's Hospital, Auchterarder, Perthshire, Scotland, UK
- Occupations: Writer; biographer; historian; philosopher
- Writing career
- Pen name: E. S. Haldane
- Genres: non-fiction, biography, philosophy

Elizabeth Sanderson Haldane LLD CH JP (/ˈhɔːldeɪn/; 27 May 1862 – 24 December 1937) was a Scottish author, biographer, philosopher, suffragist, and social welfare and nursing administrator. She managed the Royal Infirmary of Edinburgh from 1901 and established the Voluntary Aid Detachment from 1908. She became the first female Justice of the Peace in Scotland in 1920. She was awarded an LLD from St Andrews University in 1906 and was made a Member of the Order of the Companions of Honour in 1918.

== Early life ==
Elizabeth Haldane was born on 27 May 1862 at 17 Charlotte Square, Edinburgh. Her father was Robert Haldane of Cloan House near Auchterarder, Perthshire and her mother was Mary Elizabeth Sanderson. Her brothers were Richard Burdon Haldane, 1st Viscount Haldane and John Scott Haldane. She was educated by a succession of tutors and visiting schoolmasters. She wanted to go to college but it was too expensive and she was an only daughter tied to her widowed mother. Instead she educated herself by correspondence courses.

== Career ==
Haldane was persuaded by Octavia Hill to apply to the system of property administration which Hill had developed in London to the situation in Edinburgh and in 1884, at the age of 21, she became convener of the Housing Committee of the Edinburgh Social Union. She took nursing courses in the 1880s and subsequently became involved in establishing the Voluntary Aid Detachment (VAD) from 1908 onwards. She became a manager of Edinburgh Royal Infirmary around 1901 onwards.

Her autobiography, From One Century to Another covers the period from 1862 to 1914. It provides a picture of what it was like to be a well-to-do lady in the Victorian and Edwardian periods. She was intimate with royalty such as Queen Alexandra and was a personal friend of literary figures such as Matthew Arnold and George Meredith. She was taken out to dinner by Matthew Arnold who astonished her "by his knowledge of the neighbouring fishing streams, since he did not personally know the neighbourhood." George Meredith visited Cloan House in September 1890.

Haldane was an accomplished translator and put her considerable talents to use translating works of philosophy, including treatises by Descartes and Hegel. Along with G. R. T. Ross, she translated Descartes in a two-volume set, entitled The Philosophical Works, for Cambridge University Press in 1911.

In 1919 she sat on the College of Nursing Salaries Committee where she was instrumental in securing a grant from the Carnegie Trust to support the creation of their Nursing Library. In 1920, she became the first female Justice of the Peace in Scotland.

== Later life and death ==
In later life, she corresponded with her niece, Naomi Mitchison (née Haldane) who regarded her suffragist views as being out of date. Haldane accepted "the restriction of women's activities to the inside, the personal, the domestic" whereas Mitchison considered women to be equally free to pursue their lives outside the home.

Haldane died on 24 December 1937 at St Margaret's Hospital, Auchterarder.

== Official appointments ==
- Vice-Chairman, Territorial Nursing Service;
- Member of QAIM Nursing Board;
- Deputy President of British Red Cross Society, Perthshire Branch;
- for some time a Manager of Edinburgh Royal Infirmary;
- Member of Scottish Universities Committee, 1909;
- Member of Royal Commission on the civil service, 1912;
- of Advisory Committees (National and Scottish) under the Insurance Act, 1912;
- of School Board since 1903;
- of County Authority for Education, 1919–22;
- of Scottish Savings Committee, 1916;
- of General Nursing Council, 1928;
- Central Council Broadcast Adult Education, 1930;
- Governor of Birkbeck College;
- late Governor of London School of Economics.

== Publications ==
- Hegel's History of Philosophy (3 vols), translated with Miss Frances H. Simson, MA. London: K. Paul, Trench, Trübner, 1892–96;
- The Wisdom and Religion of a German Philosopher: Being selections from the writings of G. W. F. Hegel. London: Kegan Paul & Co., 1897;
- James Frederick Ferrier. (With introduction by R. B. Haldane) Edinburgh: Oliphant, Anderson and Ferrier, 1899, ("Famous Scots Series";
- Descartes: His Life and Times. London: John Murray, 1905;
- Descartes' Philosophical Works. (2 vols), with Professor G. R. T. Ross. Cambridge University Press, 1911/2;
- The British Nurse in Peace and War. London: John Murray, 1923;
- Mary Elizabeth Haldane: A Record of a Hundred Years, (1825–1925). (Edited) London: Hodder and Stoughton, [1925]; reprinted by Kennedy & Boyd (2009) in the Naomi Mitchison Library Series;
- George Eliot and her Times: A Victorian Study. London: Hodder & Stoughton, 1927:
- Mrs Gaskell and her Friends. London: Hodder & Stoughton, 1930;
- The Scotland of our Fathers: A Study of Scottish Life in the Nineteenth Century. London: Alexander Maclehose & Co., 1933;
- Scots Gardens in Old Times, 1200–1800. London: Alexander Maclehose & Co., 1934;
- From One Century to Another: The Reminiscences of Elizabeth S. Haldane. London: Alexander Maclehose & Co., 1937;
- Articles in various magazines, and in Encyclopædia of Religion and Ethics

== Sources ==
- Who Was Who, A & C Black, 1920–2008; online edn, Oxford University Press, Dec 2007 available at http://www.ukwhoswho.com/view/article/oupww/whowaswho/U210623
- From One Century to Another: The Reminiscences of Elizabeth S. Haldane. London: Alexander Maclehose & Co., 1937. Available here.
- British Library catalogue available at http://www.bl.uk.
