= Perth Royal Infirmary =

Hospital in Perth, Scotland

- NHS Tayside
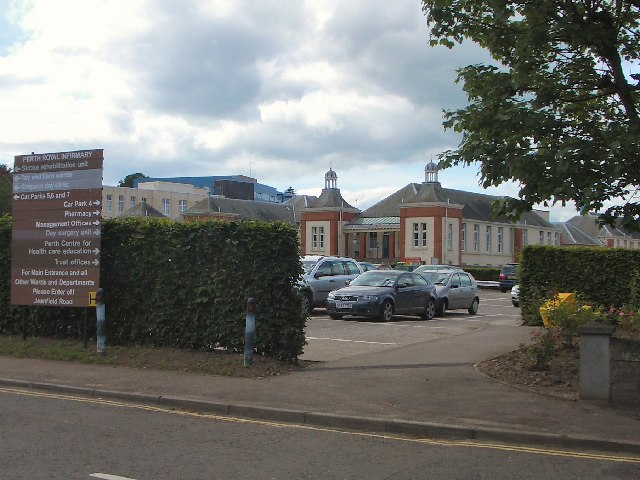
- Entrance to Perth Royal Infirmary

- Shown in Perth and Kinross

Geography
- Location: Perth, Perth and Kinross, Scotland, United Kingdom
- Coordinates: 56°23′48″N 3°27′19″W

Organisation
- Care system: NHS Scotland
- Type: General
- Affiliated university: University of Dundee

Services
- Emergency department: Yes
- Beds: 267

History
- Founded: 1838 (188 years ago) (as Perth City and County Infirmary); 1912–1914 (current hospital)

Links
- Website: Official website

Perth Royal Infirmary is a district hospital in Perth. The Royal Infirmary serves a population of around 182,000 across the City of Perth and the wider Perth and Kinross area. It is managed by NHS Tayside.

== History ==
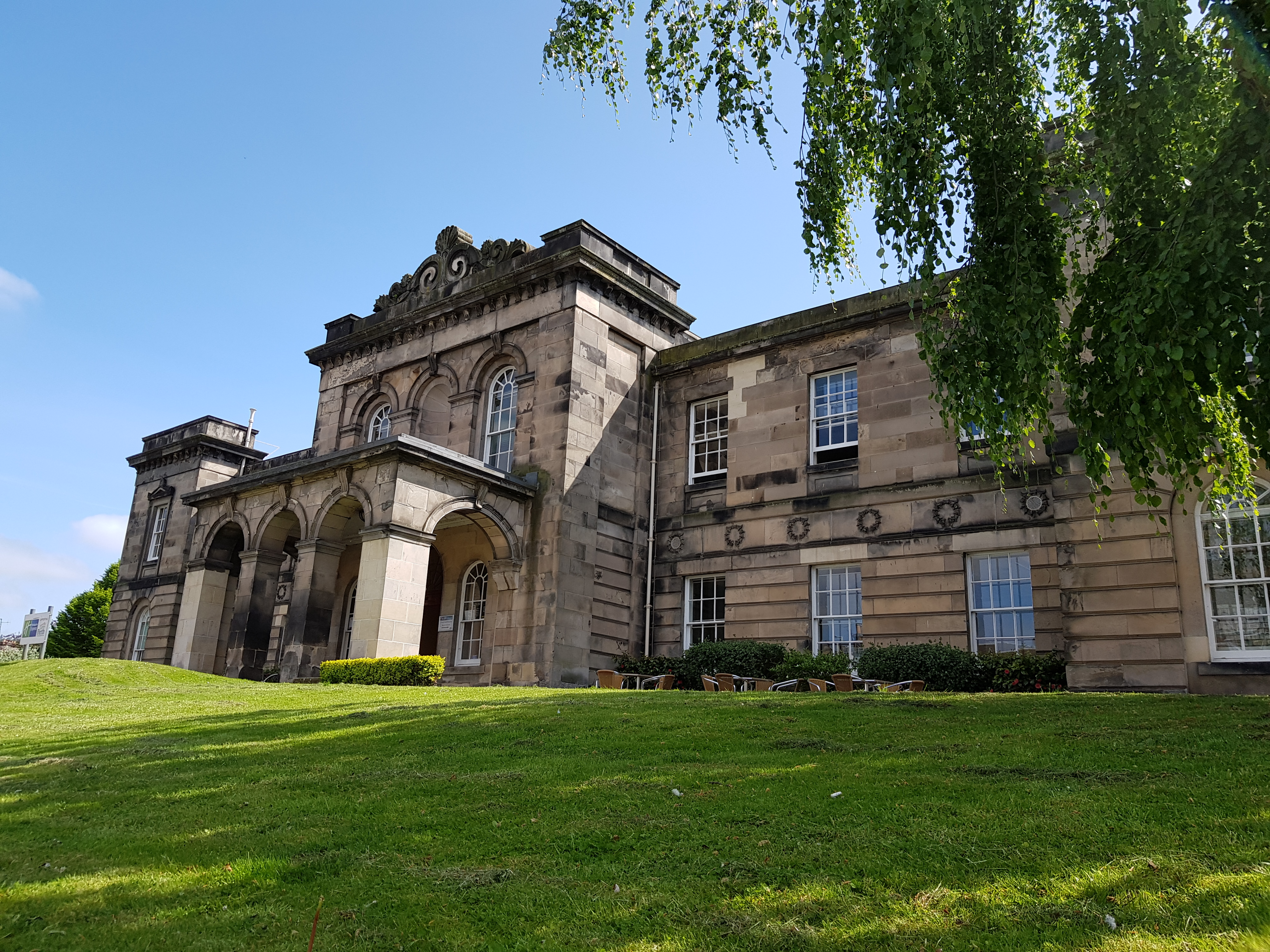
The original hospital (centre section only), now the A. K. Bell Library

Perth Royal infirmary has its origins in the County and City Infirmary in York Place. This Grecian style building was designed by William Mackenzie, with the original cost of the land and buildings being £6812-15-3 ½d. The building of the hospital was funded by public subscription and it opened on 1 October 1838. It closed when the current building was completed.

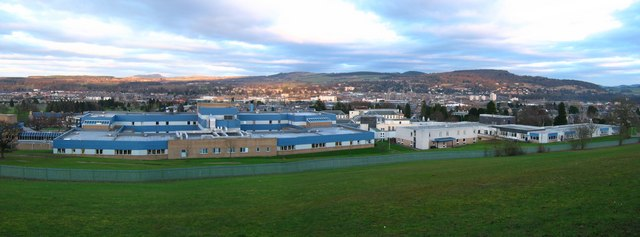
Perth Royal Infirmary

The current Perth Royal Infirmary was built on a site on Glasgow Road between 1912 and 1914. An extension containing operating theatres and kitchens was added between 1934 and 1935. The Accident & Emergency department was added in 1993 and the hospital became a University Teaching Hospital in 2006.

Developments completed in 2009 included a new 10-bed Macmillan cancer hospice costing £4.5 million, the demolition of the listed Cornhill House to allow room for expansion and the creation of a £2 million dialysis unit and a £1.7 million haematology and oncology facility.

The archives of Perth Royal Infirmary are held by Archive Services, University of Dundee as part of the NHS Tayside Archives.

== Hospital Radio ==
Hospital Radio Perth has been serving the Royal Infirmary and Murray Royal Hospital since 1989, prior to which there had been no hospital radio service in existence on the site. Hospital Radio Perth are the winners of the UK Hospital Radio of the Year award four times 1996, 1997 1999 and 2007, making them one of the most successful stations in operation in the UK.

== Public transport ==
Perth Royal Infirmary is roughly one mile from the city centre. There are some bus services that run to the hospital, which are all provided by Stagecoach: the route 1 service stops right outside the hospital. A new bus link between Perth Royal Infirmary and the other main Tayside hospital, Ninewells Hospital, called "Hospital Link", started in April 2008 to relieve car parking problems at the hospitals. In 2014, this service was replaced by an extension of the existing X7 Coastrider route. That route was stopped in 2024, replaced by an extended Stagecoach South Scotland service 39 and new services 39A/39B.
