= Sam Eljamel =

Libyan surgeon

Muftah Salem "Sam" Eljamel is a Libyan surgeon who was head of Neurosurgery at Ninewells Hospital in Dundee, Scotland from 1995 until 2013. He was suspended in 2013 following accusations of medical malpractice. A public inquiry into his conduct ordered by the Scottish government opened in November 2025 with public hearings commencing in September 2026.

== Background ==
Eljamel is of Libyan nationality and graduated with a MBBCh from Al Fateh University in Tripoli in 1982. He worked at the Walton Centre, a major neurology hospital in Liverpool, from September 1987 to August 1991.

From October 1991 to April 1995 he was employed as Senior Neurosurgical Registrar at Beaumont Hospital in Dublin, Republic of Ireland. Eljamel claimed to have completed a fellowship in Clinical Neurosurgery at Hartford Hospital and the University of Connecticut Health Centre in 1995, however this was denied by Hartford Hospital. He also claimed to be a visiting professor at the University of Connecticut and the University of San Diego, which both universities denied.

He took up his post as head of Neurosurgery at Ninewells Hospital in 1995. The post conferred an honorary senior lectureship in Surgical Neurology at the University of Dundee. He was made an Honorary Reader in 2005 and an Honorary Professor in 2009, but did not hold a chair at the university. He falsely claimed on his CV to be Head of Department/Section for Surgical Neurology at the University of Dundee despite there being no such department and despite not being an employee of the university.

He also operated on private patients at Fernbrae Hospital in Dundee, which closed in 2019.. He was described as "one of Scotland's most respected surgeons".

== Accusations of medical malpractice ==
Concerns were raised by whistle-blowers as early as 2009 that he was harming patients. Eljamel was regularly away from the hospital doing private work when he was meant to be operating on patients and leaving junior surgeons to operate unsupervised. He has been accused of serial malpractice including botched and unnecessary operations, including multiple wrong-site spinal surgeries, a so-called never event, as well as experimenting on his patients. It is estimated that as many as 200 patients were harmed by him.

He was placed under supervision in June 2013 and an investigation was opened by the Royal College of Surgeons of Edinburgh. He was suspended in December of that year following publication of their final report. An internal NHS Tayside due diligence review later criticised NHS Tayside management for putting him under indirect supervision rather than suspending him in the first instance. When placed under light supervision, NHS Tayside left Eljamel to explain the situation to Fernbrae Hospital and he excused himself from carrying out further procedures by saying he was unwell.

He resigned from his positions at NHS Tayside and Fernbrae Hospital in May 2014 and was informed that his honorary positions within Dundee University would end on 31 May 2014. Rather than facing a medical tribunal, was allowed to voluntarily remove himself from the medical register in 2015.

== Post-suspension ==
Eljamel established an office in Berlin, Connecticut, US in 2015, describing himself as an expert in General Neurosurgery, Stereotactic and Functional Neurosurgery.

Despite having been removed from the medical register, Eljamel was invited to chair a session at a Royal Society of Medicine conference in 2016. The organisers retracted their invitation after being made aware of his background. In 2016 he was subject to a probe by Liverpool University for claiming to hold the position of Professor in their Department of Neuroscience despite having no involvement with the university since achieving his doctorate in 1992. In 2017 he was ordered to remove claims on his personal website that he was registered with the General Medical Council.

Eljamel left Scotland in 2018. The extent of the malpractice allegations became public knowledge later in 2018 with the televising of a BBC Scotland Disclosure documentary. This led to the opening of an investigation by Police Scotland.

In 2020 it was revealed that Eljamel was practicing surgery at Al-Nahda Hospital in Misrata, Libya. It emerged that the General Medical Council had mistakenly informed the Saudi Arabian Authorities of his erasure, and the Libyan Authorities were not informed until 2023.

Patients who had been operated on by Eljamel sued NHS Tayside for compensation. This included one patient being awarded compensation £2.8 million. Judge Lord Uist later ruled that Eljamel was liable to pay the full £2.8 million.

In 2022 an internal Scottish Government report stated that NHS Tayside repeatedly let patients down with failures in the way Eljamel was supervised and in their communication with patients. In 2024 the Lord Advocate, the principle legal adviser of the Scottish Government and the Crown in Scotland, criticised the pace of the seven year police investigation.

== Public inquiry ==
In April 2023, then Minister for Public Health Michael Matheson launched an independent review of NHS Tayside in relation to Eljamel. A public inquiry was announced in September of that year, to be headed by Judge Lord Weir. Matheson stated that Eljamel should be brought to account and that extradition could be an option as the Scottish government has extradition procedures in place with Libya.

A separate independent clinical review was also announced, with 544 patients or their representatives registering for a personalised review of the care they received under Eljamel.

The public inquiry opened in November 2025, hearing evidence that NHS Tayside had destroyed 40 operating theatre logbooks covering the period Eljamel had practised at Ninewells Hospital, despite a "do not destroy" order being in place, which was described by the inquiry's senior counsel, Jamie Dawson KC, as a potential breach of the Inquiries Act 2005. Public evidence hearings commenced on the 8th September 2026.

== Bibliography ==
- Eljamel, Sam (2011), Problem based neurosurgery, WSPC, ISBN 978-9813203655
- Eljamel, Sam; Slavin, Konstantin (2013), Neurostimulation: Principles and Practice, Wiley Blackwell, ISBN 978-1118346358
