= Tayside Children's Hospital =

- NHS Tayside
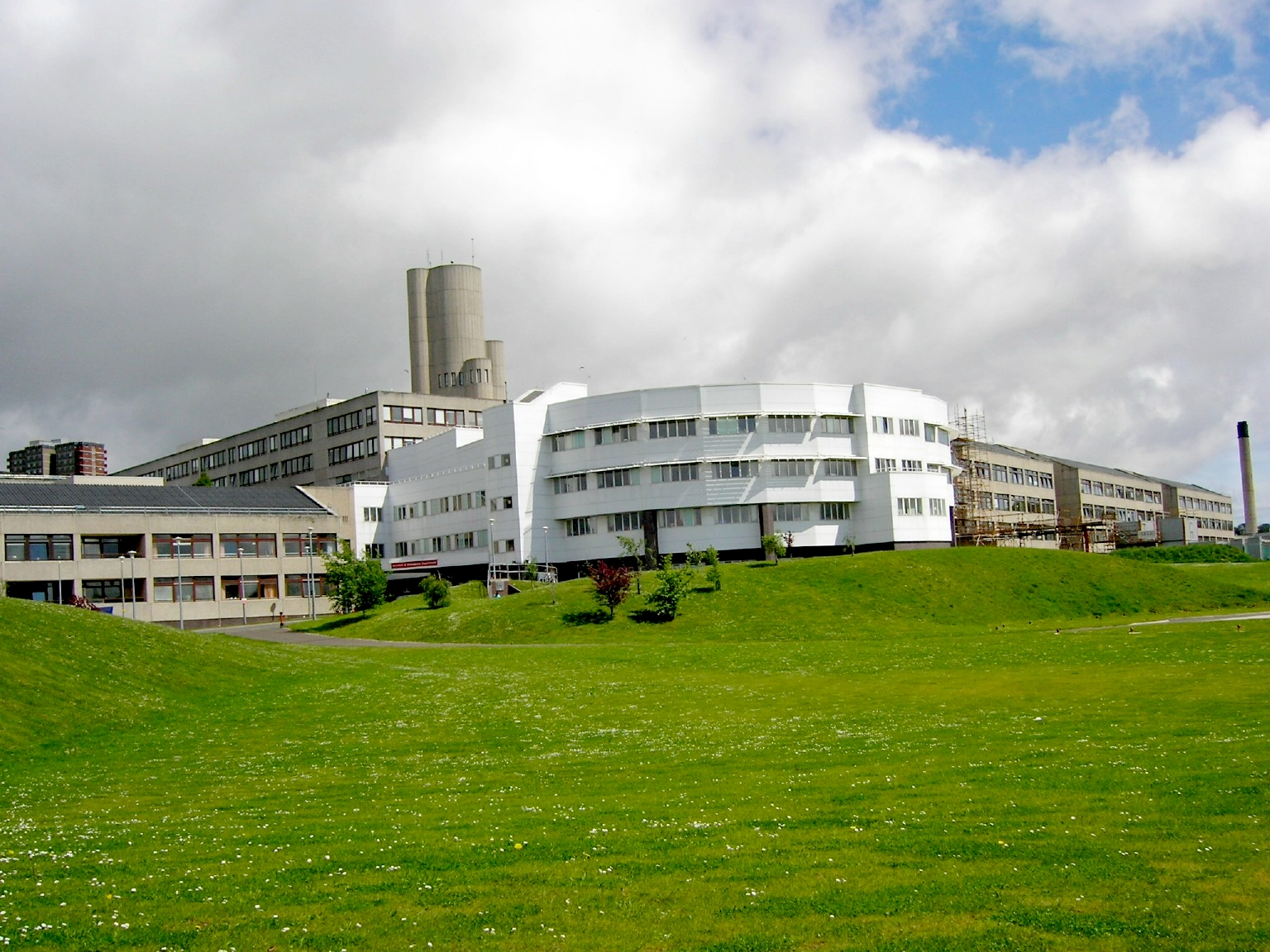
- Ninewells Hospital where Tayside Children's Hospital is based

- Shown in Dundee

Geography
- Location: Dundee, Scotland
- Coordinates: 56.465°N 3.039°W

Organisation
- Care system: NHS Scotland
- Type: Specialist

Services
- Beds: 40
- Speciality: Paediatric care

History
- Founded: 2006

Links
- Other links: List of hospitals in Scotland

Tayside Children's Hospital is a children's facility which is attached to Ninewells Hospital in Dundee, Scotland. It delivers services to children who live in Dundee, Angus, Perth and Kinross and north east Fife and is managed by NHS Tayside.

== History ==
The concept of establishing a children's hospital in Dundee had been under consideration since 1995. Approval for the construction of the facility was granted in 1999, and the development proceeded in two stages: the initial phase comprised a set of laboratories, while the second phase encompassed the creation of family-friendly accommodation for parents. The new facility was officially inaugurated by television personality Fred MacAulay on 7 June 2006.

== Services ==
In the facility is a 40-bed children's medical ward which includes a six-bed High Dependency Unit and the Paediatric Assessment Unit. An outdoor play area and a large indoor play centre is run by staff. Close to the children's wards is the Ronald McDonald suites for parents to reside in while their child is in hospital.

Tayside Children's Hospital also extends beyond the Ninewells site with the Children's Ambulatory Care Unit located at Perth Royal Infirmary.
