= King's Cross Hospital =

- NHS Tayside
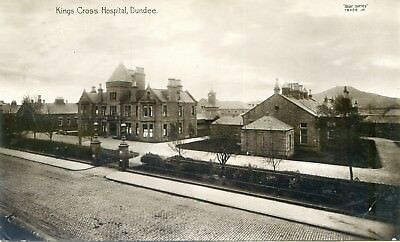
- Kings Cross Hospital, Dundee

- Shown in Dundee

Geography
- Location: Dundee, Scotland
- Coordinates: 56.476205°N 2.985647°W

Organisation
- Care system: NHS Scotland
- Type: General

History
- Founded: November 1889; 136 years ago

Links
- Lists: Hospitals in Scotland

King's Cross Hospital, often shortened to King's Cross is a hospital in Dundee, Scotland. It is managed by NHS Tayside.

== History ==
King's Cross opened in November 1889 at a site in Clepington Road, Dundee. It was the city's first permanent fever hospital and was built by Dundee Town Council to treat patients with infectious diseases, including typhus, diphtheria and smallpox. Until the late 1860s, such patients had usually been admitted to Dundee Royal Infirmary, although a temporary fever hospital had been set up in a converted building in Lower Union Street during the 1832 cholera outbreak.

As the need for isolation of patients with infectious diseases became more widely recognised, some temporary wooden pavilions were built on the outskirts of Lochee in 1867 and later on the site of what is now King's Cross for smallpox and typhus patients. Kings Cross, which initially had just two wards, took over their function. By 1913 King's Cross had seven wards supplemented by a variety of ancillary buildings. These included King's Cross Hospital (West), built in 1893 as accommodation for cases of smallpox, with a small unit for cholera patients. These facilities were used intermittently until 1927 when the hospital had to address an outbreak of variola minor. This outbreak was severe enough to require an additional ward to be constructed.

At the creation of the National Health Service in 1948, King's Cross came under the management of the new Eastern Regional Hospital Board and was run by Dundee General Hospitals Board of Management. The Eastern Regional Hospital Board decided to centralise the management of infectious disease at King's Cross, resulting in the closure the former fever hospitals at Perth, Forfar and Arbroath. In 1988 work began on a new out-patient department. Since the 1990s most of the hospital's services have been transferred to Ninewells Hospital. King's Cross now serves as the administrative headquarters of NHS Tayside. The hospital is also the site of NHS Tayside's Kings Cross Health and Community Care Centre, which offers several outpatient services including audiology, physiotherapy, dentistry and x-ray and is also the base for Dundee's "Out of Hours GP Service".

The King's Cross Hospital archives are held by Archive Services at the University of Dundee as part of the NHS Tayside Archives. The same institution also holds the papers of Dr William Maxwell Jamieson OBE who worked at the hospital from 1939 until 1979 and became its Physician Superintendent in 1948. These papers include several records relating to the hospital and its history. A history of the hospital by Jamieson was produced in 1989 to mark its centenary.
