= Kingsway Care Centre =

- NHS Tayside
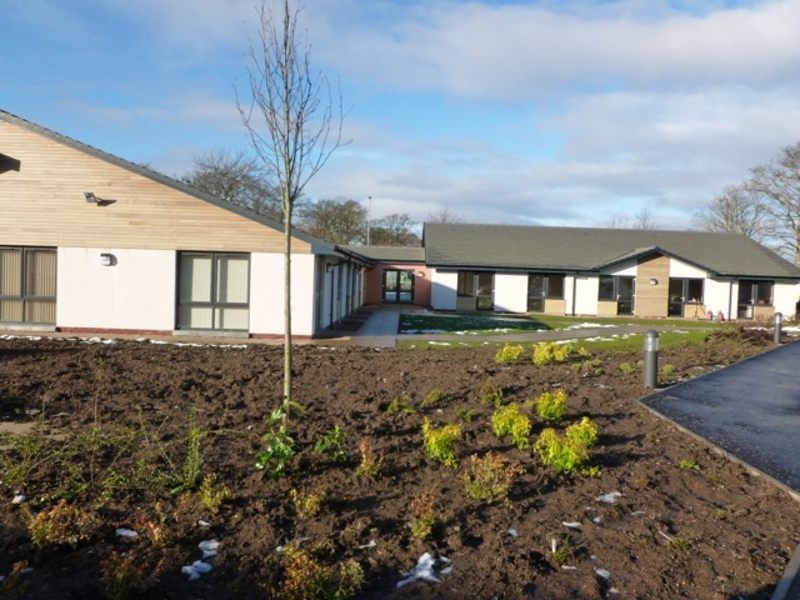
- Kingsway Care Centre

- Shown in Dundee

Geography
- Location: Scotland
- Coordinates: 56.4770323°N 2.9995°W

Organisation
- Care system: NHS Scotland
- Type: Hospital

Services
- Emergency department: No
- Beds: 38

History
- Founded: 2013

Links
- Lists: Hospitals in Scotland

Kingsway Care Centre is a Psychiatry of Old Age mental health unit in Dundee. It is managed by NHS Tayside.

== History ==
Kingsway Care Centre was built in 2012, originally as a care home for lease, and has been leased to NHS Tayside since 2013. It has three wards at present:

- Ward 1 - dementia assessment unit, mixed gender.
- Ward 3 - dementia assessment unit, mixed gender.
- Ward 4 - functional mental health assessment unit, mixed gender.

It also has Community Mental Health Teams including East, West and Care Home Team.

It is the home of Psychiatry of Old Age wards that were formerly at Royal Dundee Liff Hospital prior to July 2013.
