= Whitehills Hospital =

- NHS Tayside
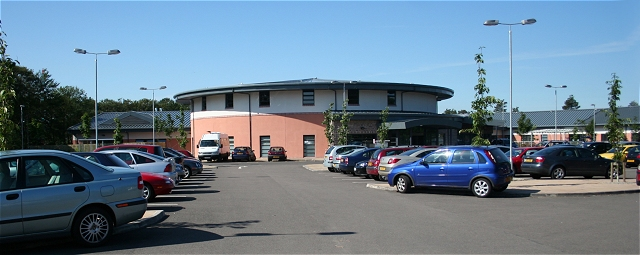
- The new Whitehills Health and Community Care Centre

- Shown in Angus

Geography
- Location: Station Road, Forfar, Scotland
- Coordinates: 56.6509°N 2.8720°W

Organisation
- Care system: NHS Scotland
- Type: General

History
- Founded: 1901

Links
- Lists: Hospitals in Scotland

Whitehills Hospital is a health facility in Station Road in Forfar, Angus, Scotland. Formerly an isolation hospital and then a geriatric hospital, in its current form, it is a community hospital known as the Whitehills Health and Community Care Centre. It is managed by NHS Tayside.

== History ==
The original facility on the site, which was designed by McArthy and Watson as an isolation hospital, opened as the Forfarshire County Fever Hospital in 1901. After joining the National Health Service in 1948, it became a geriatric facility known as Whitehills Hospital in 1949. A modern community hospital known as the Whitehills Health and Community Care Centre, which was commissioned to replace the aging Forfar Infirmary, was built on the site and opened in 2005.
