= Dundee Dental Hospital =

- NHS Tayside
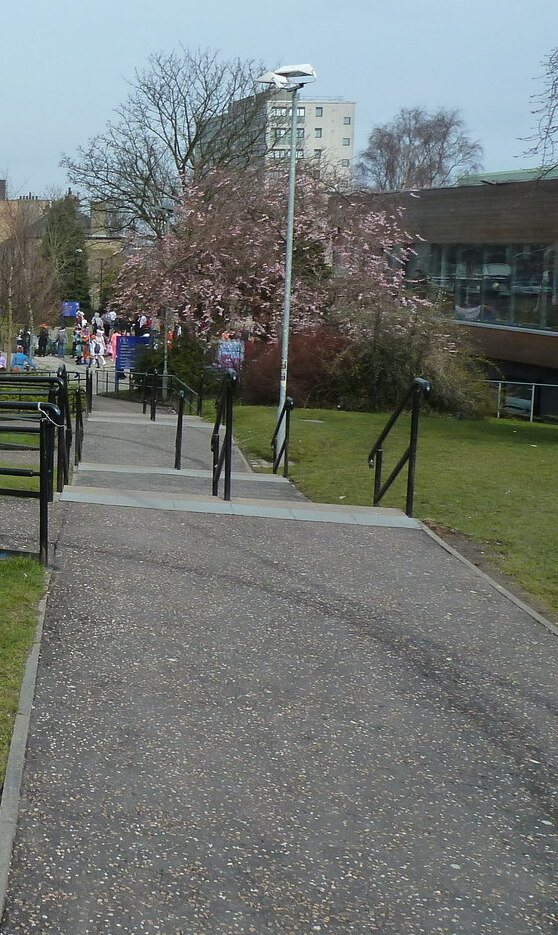
- Dundee Dental Hospital (the tall grey building in the background)

- Shown in Dundee

Geography
- Location: Park Place, Dundee, Scotland
- Coordinates: 56.4584°N 2.9793°W

Organisation
- Care system: NHS Scotland
- Type: Specialist

Services
- Speciality: Dentistry

History
- Founded: 1914

Links
- Other links: List of hospitals in Scotland

Dundee Dental Hospital is a health facility in Park Place in Dundee, Scotland. It is managed by the University of Dundee and NHS Tayside.

== History ==
The facility has its origins in a dental club formed by the University College of Dundee in 1909. The dental hospital itself was established by Sir George Baxter when he rented to flats in two villas in Park Place in 1914. The hospital joined the National Health Service in 1948. The villas were replaced with a large stone building, designed by Findlay, Stewart & Robbie, on the same site in 1952. An extension in the form of a modern tower block, designed by Robbie & Wellwood, was opened the Queen Elizabeth The Queen Mother in 1968.

The archives of the hospital are held by Archive Services at the University of Dundee.
