= Arbroath Infirmary =

- NHS Tayside
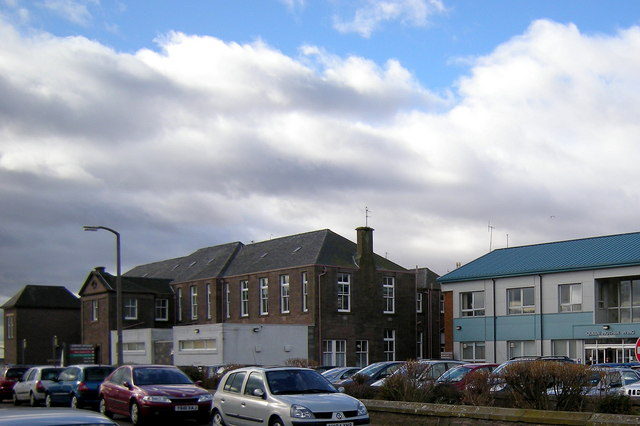
- Arbroath Infirmary

- Shown in Angus

Geography
- Location: Arbroath, Scotland
- Coordinates: 56.5545°N 2.5973°W

Organisation
- Care system: NHS Scotland

Services
- Emergency department: No

History
- Founded: 1845

Links
- Lists: Hospitals in Scotland

Arbroath Infirmary is a hospital at the top of Rosemount Road in Arbroath serving the town and the greater area of Angus, Scotland. The hospital is managed by NHS Tayside.

== History ==
The origins of Arbroath Infirmary can be traced back to 1836 when a dispensary run by local medical practitioners was set up by public subscription to meet an urgent need for medical provision and the care of the poor in Arbroath. Following a typhus epidemic in 1842, a small fever ward for in-patients was set up, and the following year subscriptions began to be collected so an infirmary could be established. The result of these efforts led to the official foundation of the hospital 12 January 1845 at premises in Dundee Road, Arbroath, originally for cases of fever and accidents. By 1855, it had 50 beds, and by 1867, that number had grown to 60. After experiencing overcrowding, it was moved in 1916 to a larger building in Rosemount Road.

With the advent of the National Health Service in 1947, Arbroath Infirmary became part of the Eastern Region Hospital Board. A new wing was opened by Queen Elizabeth The Queen Mother on 26 September 1961.
