= Pitlochry Community Hospital =

- NHS Tayside
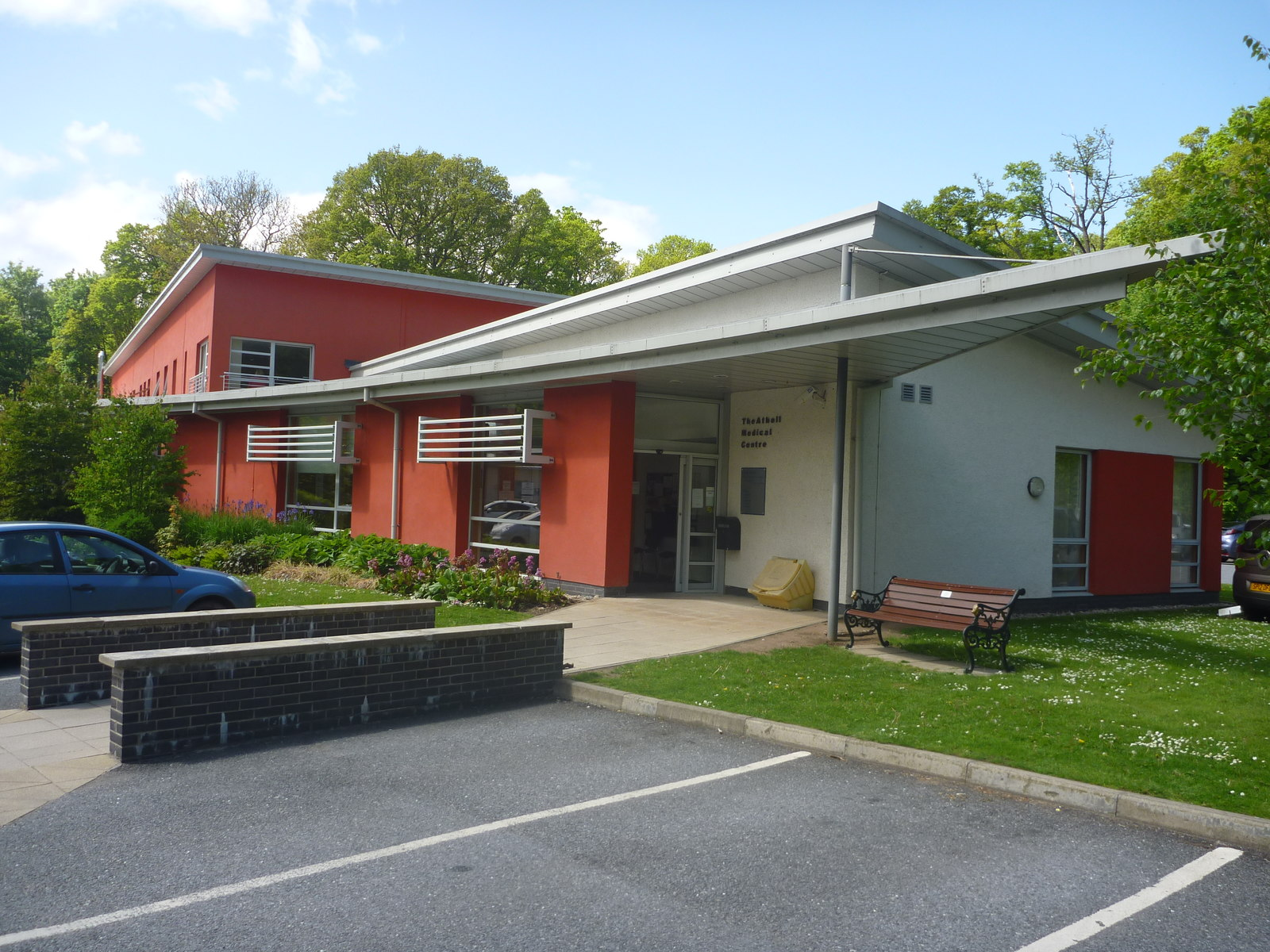
- Pitlochry Community Hospital and Atholl Medical Centre

- Shown in Perth and Kinross

Geography
- Location: Ferry Road, Pitlochry, Scotland
- Coordinates: 56.7016°N 3.7371°W

Organisation
- Care system: NHS Scotland
- Type: Community

Services
- Emergency department: No

History
- Founded: 2008

Links
- Lists: Hospitals in Scotland

Pitlochry Community Hospital is a health facility in Ferry Road, Pitlochry, Scotland. It is managed by NHS Tayside.

== History ==
The facility was intended to replace the aging Irvine Memorial Hospital and was procured under a private finance initiative contract in 2005. It was designed by Campbell and Arnott and incorporates a GP's facility known as the Atholl Medical Centre. The facility was built by Stewart Milne Construction at a cost of £7 million, was opened by Nicola Sturgeon, Cabinet Secretary for Health and Wellbeing, in August 2008.
