= Logie, Dundee =

Residental area in Dundee

Coordinates: 56.461687°N 3.002853°W

Logie: Scottish Gaelic: An Lagan
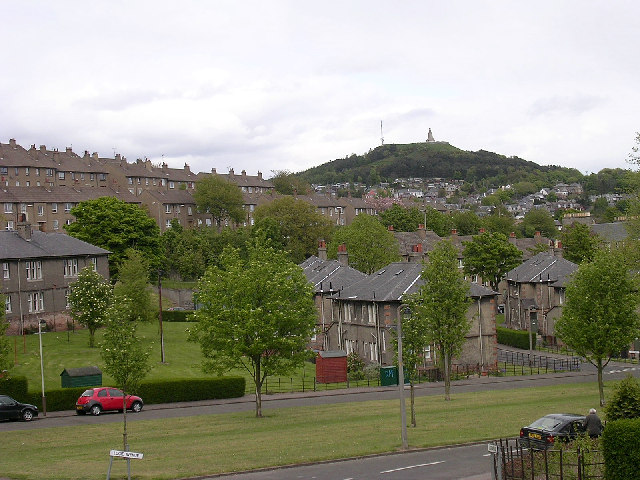

- Location within Dundee City council area Location within Scotland
- Population: 4,666
- OS grid reference: NO383304
- Council area: Dundee City
- Lieutenancy area: Dundee
- Country: Scotland
- Sovereign state: United Kingdom
- Post town: DUNDEE
- Postcode district: DD2
- Dialling code: 01382
- Police: Scotland
- Fire: Scottish
- Ambulance: Scottish
- UK Parliament: Dundee West
- Scottish Parliament: Dundee City West

Logie is a residential area of Dundee, Scotland, located around 2 kilometres (1.2 miles) west of the city centre and forming part of the city’s West End ward. The district is best known for the Logie Housing Estate, built between 1919 and 1920 as the first public housing estate in Scotland constructed after the First World War, notable for its innovative design and early district heating scheme. The area, which takes its name from the former Logie or Lochee estate, is characterised by its tree-lined streets, maisonette-style housing and proximity to green spaces such as Victoria Park and Balgay Park, and was designated an outstanding conservation area in 1991.

== History ==
=== Etymology ===
The name Logie probably represents a Pictish or Gaelic toponymic element *login, "ecclesiastical site".

=== Early history ===
The history of Logie stretches back several centuries, with its roots tied closely to the Lochee and Blackness areas of Dundee. For much of its early history, the area formed part of the Logie or Lochee estate, which can be traced in records as far back as the mid-17th century. The estate passed through a number of prominent intermarrying families, including members of the Wedderburn baronets, a powerful family connected to the mercantile and civic life of Dundee. The mansion house of Logie, a substantial residence with surrounding grounds, stood as a local landmark until its demolition in 1905, marking the end of the estate era and paving the way for future urban development.

In the later 19th century, Dundee was expanding rapidly due to the success of the jute industry. The growing population and accompanying social problems, including overcrowding in tenements, laid the groundwork for large-scale housing reform projects. It was in this context that the Logie housing estate became one of the most pioneering schemes in Scotland.

The Logie, or Lochee, estate belonged to several inter-marrying families, documented from at least 1660. These included the Wedderburn baronets. The mansion house was large, and was

=== 20th century ===
Built between 1919 and 1920, the Logie estate is among Dundee’s most significant examples of early 20th-century social housing and holds a special place in Scottish housing history. Designed by the city architect James Thomson, it was the first public housing estate in Scotland to be constructed after the First World War as part of the government's "Homes fit for heroes" initiative, which aimed to improve living conditions for returning servicemen and working-class families.

The estate was remarkable in both design and ambition. It incorporated one of the earliest district heating schemes in Europe, operated from a central boilerhouse that not only supplied heat to the homes but also powered a public wash-house available to the wider community. This innovation was so effective that it became a memorable feature of life in Logie, with residents recalling how snow on the pavements melted due to the warmth of the underground pipes. However, by the late 1970s, the system was decommissioned, and individual central heating was installed in each home.

The architecture itself reflected a shift towards healthier, more humane living spaces. Instead of traditional tenements, the houses were built in blocks of four flats, each with its own front door – a style akin to the English maisonette. This arrangement gave residents a greater sense of independence and privacy. The houses typically contained either two or three rooms (in addition to kitchen and bathroom facilities), which represented a significant improvement compared to the overcrowded single-room tenements many had left behind.

Logie was also designed with open space in mind. Each house had access to small allotments – intended to promote self-sufficiency and healthy living – and communal drying greens, which encouraged a sense of community. Today, many allotments have been grassed over, but the green layout of the estate remains a defining feature.

The estate is bisected by Logie Avenue, a wide, tree-lined dual carriageway designed with a viewpoint at its upper end near Victoria Park, offering views across the city. This emphasis on greenery, open space, and aesthetic detailing marked a departure from purely functional housing and reflected Thomson’s vision of creating an environment that combined beauty with practicality.

In recognition of its historical and architectural importance, the Logie estate was designated an “outstanding” conservation area in 1991. The conservation report praised the care taken in the detailing of the homes and their surroundings, noting that the “facades are enlivened by simple and effective brick detailing” and that “the garden fences, gates, address plates, railings, steps and paths give the area a wonderful unity which is still intact today.”

=== 21st century ===
In 2012, the site of the former Logie Secondary School was redeveloped as a new combined primary school, replacing Park Place Primary and St Joseph’s Primary.

While many of the estate’s original allotments have since been grassed over, the layout of wide avenues, open spaces, and communal greens remains intact. The area is still considered one of the best-preserved early 20th-century housing schemes in Scotland.

== Recreation ==
At the north-western boundary of the estate lies Victoria Park, one of Dundee’s smaller public parks, which provides open lawns, tree-lined paths, and children’s play facilities. The upper end of Logie Avenue was originally designed to serve as a viewpoint overlooking the city and remains a popular route for walking.

The estate itself was planned with communal recreation in mind. The original housing design included shared drying greens and small allotments, some of which were actively used for gardening and food production during the 20th century. Although many of these allotments have since been grassed over, several communal green areas remain, giving the estate a more open layout compared to other schemes built during the same period.

Within walking distance are Balgay Park and Mills Observatory, both situated to the north of the estate. Balgay Park contains extensive woodland and open space, while the observatory provides educational and recreational astronomy facilities.

== Transport ==
Logie is located around 2 km west of Dundee city centre and is served by a number of public transport links.

The main bus corridor for the area runs along Blackness Road, which forms the southern boundary of the estate. Several services operated by Xplore Dundee and Stagecoach East Scotland provide frequent connections between Logie, the city centre, Ninewells Hospital, and neighbouring areas including Lochee, Charleston, and Menzieshill. Services also extend eastwards towards Broughty Ferry, Monifieth, and Arbroath.

Historically, Logie was also connected to Dundee’s tram network, with routes running along Blackness Road until the closure of the system in 1956. Buses replaced the trams and have remained the main form of public transport in the area since then.

Bus routes
Bus route	Primary destinations	Bus stops	Service provider
6	City Centre; Ninewells Hospital	Shaftesbury Terrace; Hyndford Street	Xplore Dundee
22	Craigowl; City Centre; Ninewells Hospital	Shaftesbury Terrace; Hyndford Street	Xplore Dundee
6S; 10S	City Centre; Harris Academy; Ninewells Hospital	Shaftesbury Terrace; Hyndford Street	Xplore Dundee
17	City Centre; Ninewells Hospital	Abbotsford Place; Hyndford Street	Xplore Dundee
72, 73/A/B/C, 74/C	Carnoustie; Monifieth; City Centre; Ninewells Hospital	Shaftesbury Terrace; Abbotsford Place	Stagecoach East Scotland

== Education ==
Adjacent to the housing estate, on the corner of Blackness Road and Glenagnes Road, stood Logie secondary school, which was later a Harris Academy annexe for first and second year pupils who would then transfer to the main Perth Road campus by third year. Logie Secondary School was designed by C.G. Soutar and opened in 1928. This stood on the site of the Logie poorhouse of Liff & Benvie Parish, which was itself opened in April 1864. The school was destroyed by fire in 2001. A new combined site primary school is being built on the site in 2012. This will replace Park Place, and St Joseph's primaries.

== Politics ==
Logie lies within Dundee City Council’s West End ward, which is represented by four councillors elected under the Single Transferable Vote (STV) system. At the 2022 local government election, the ward returned two councillors from the Scottish National Party, Nadia El-Nakla and Bill Campbell, and two councillors from the Scottish Liberal Democrats, Fraser Macpherson and Michael Crichton.

At the parliamentary level, the area forms part of the Dundee West constituency for both the Scottish Parliament and the UK Parliament.

== Gallery ==
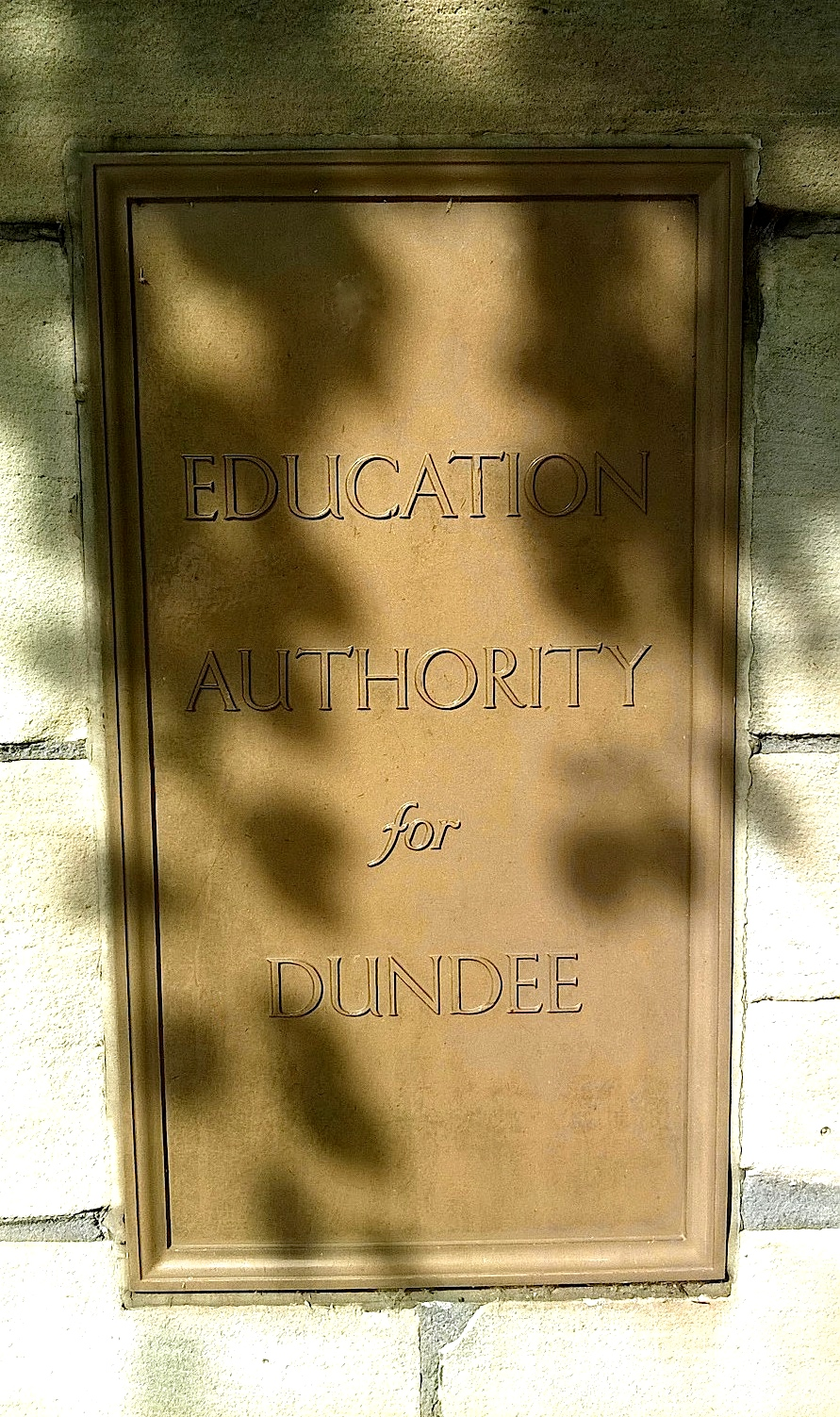
Logie Central School Dundee

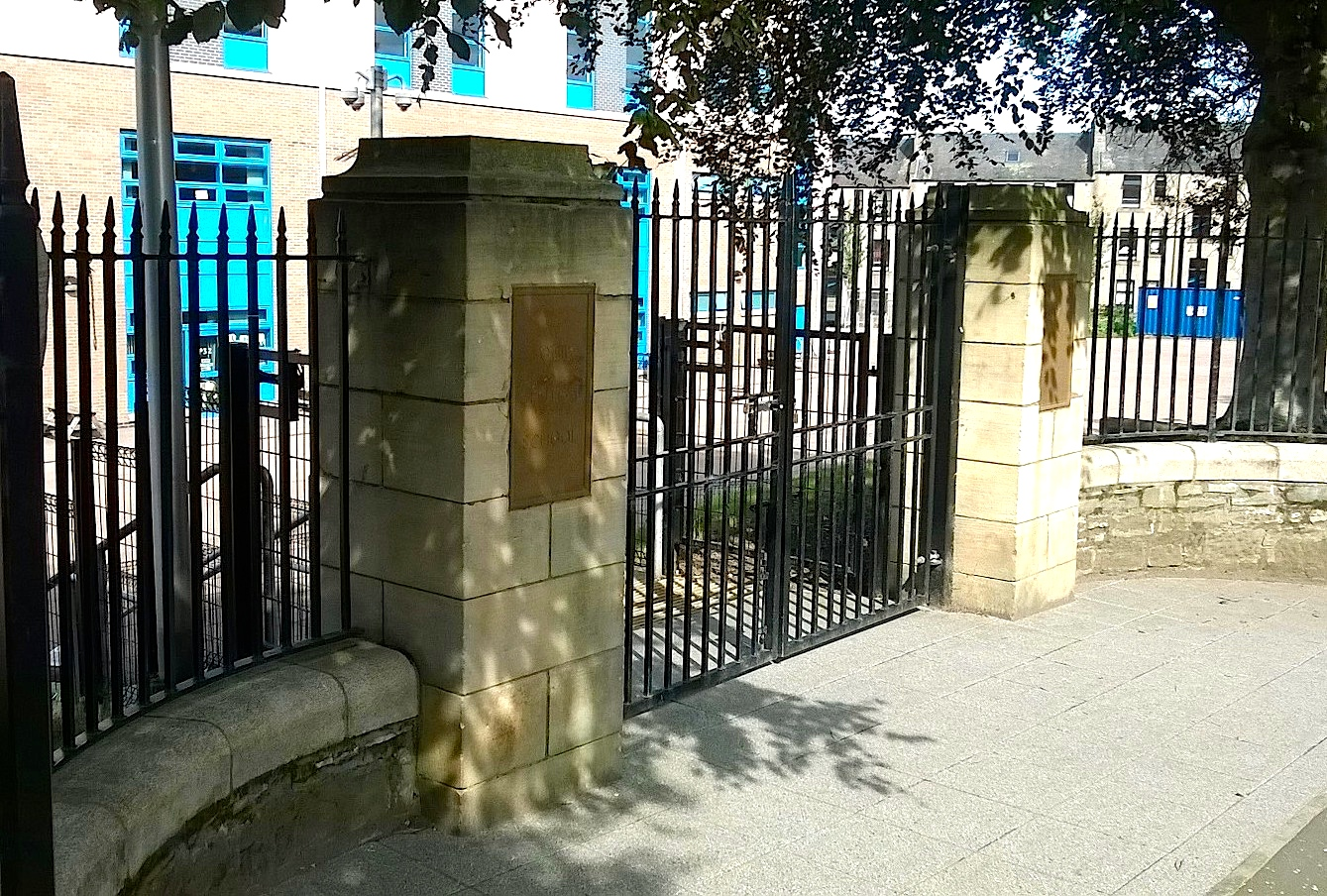
Logie Central School Dundee gates

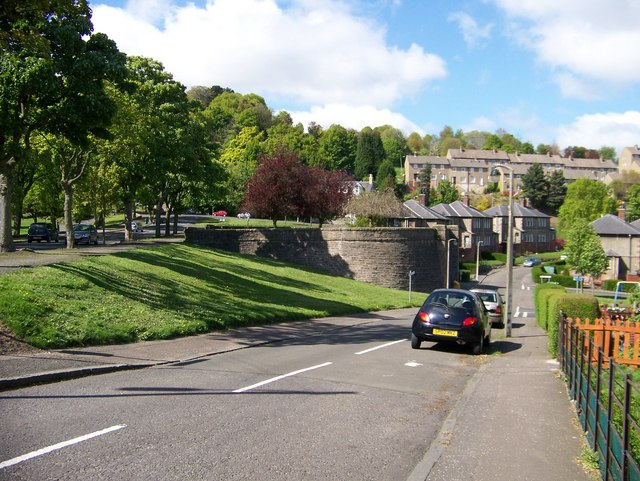
The top of Logie housing estate
