= Royal Dundee Liff Hospital =

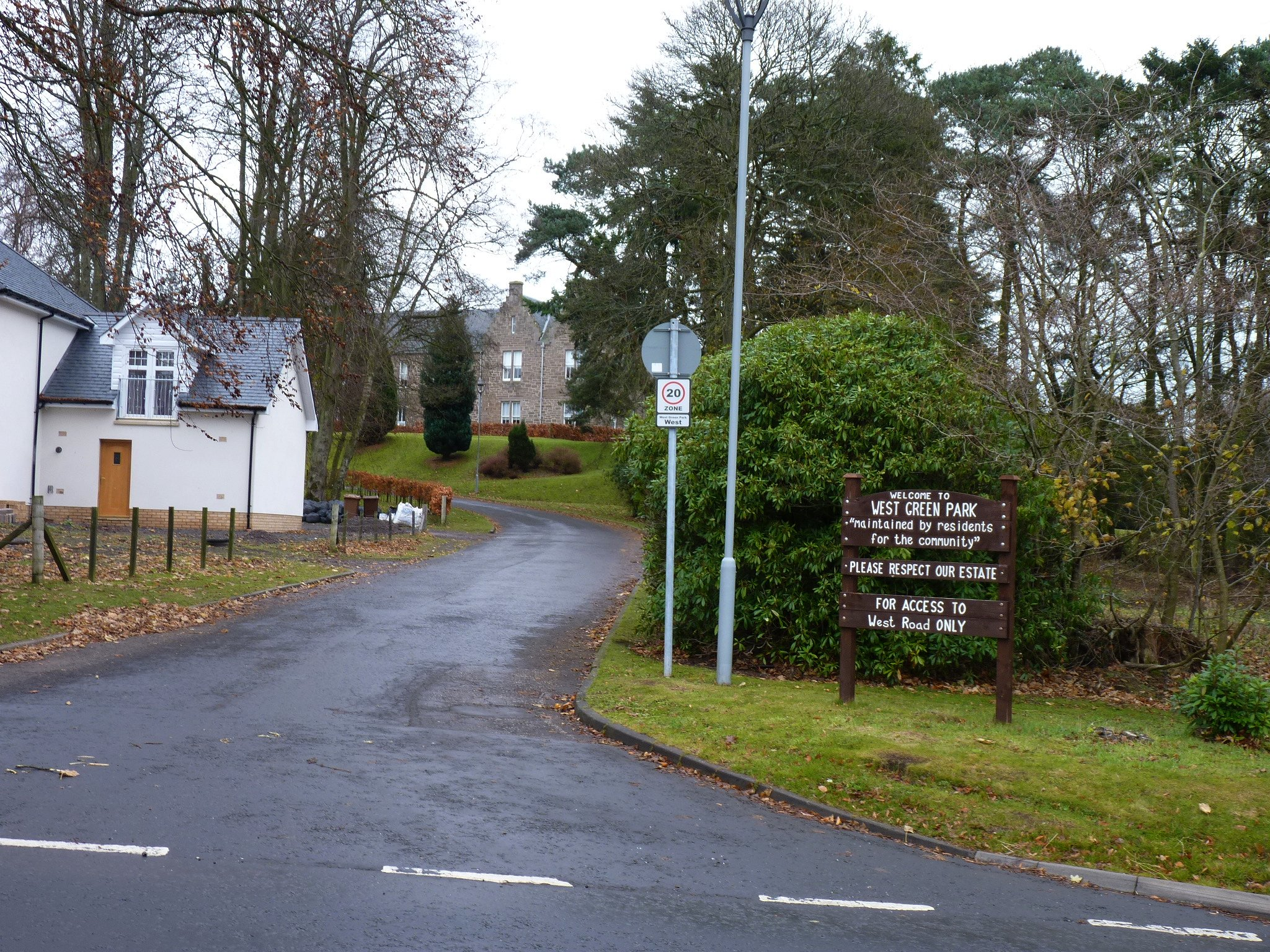
- West Green Park

- Shown in Angus

Geography
- Location: Liff, Angus, Scotland
- Coordinates: 56.48267°N 3.06928°W

Organisation
- Care system: NHS Scotland
- Type: Specialist

Services
- Emergency department: No
- Speciality: Mental health

History
- Founded: 1820
- Closed: 2001

Links
- Lists: Hospitals in Scotland

The Royal Dundee Liff Hospital, previously known as Dundee Lunatic Asylum and Dundee Royal Lunatic Asylum, was a mental health facility originally established in 1812 in Dundee, Scotland. It was originally located in premises in Albert Street Dundee, but later moved out of the town to new buildings in the nearby parish of Liff and Benvie. Buildings at Liff included Greystanes House, which was the main building, and, Gowrie House, which was the private patients' facility. Both Grade B listed buildings.

== History ==
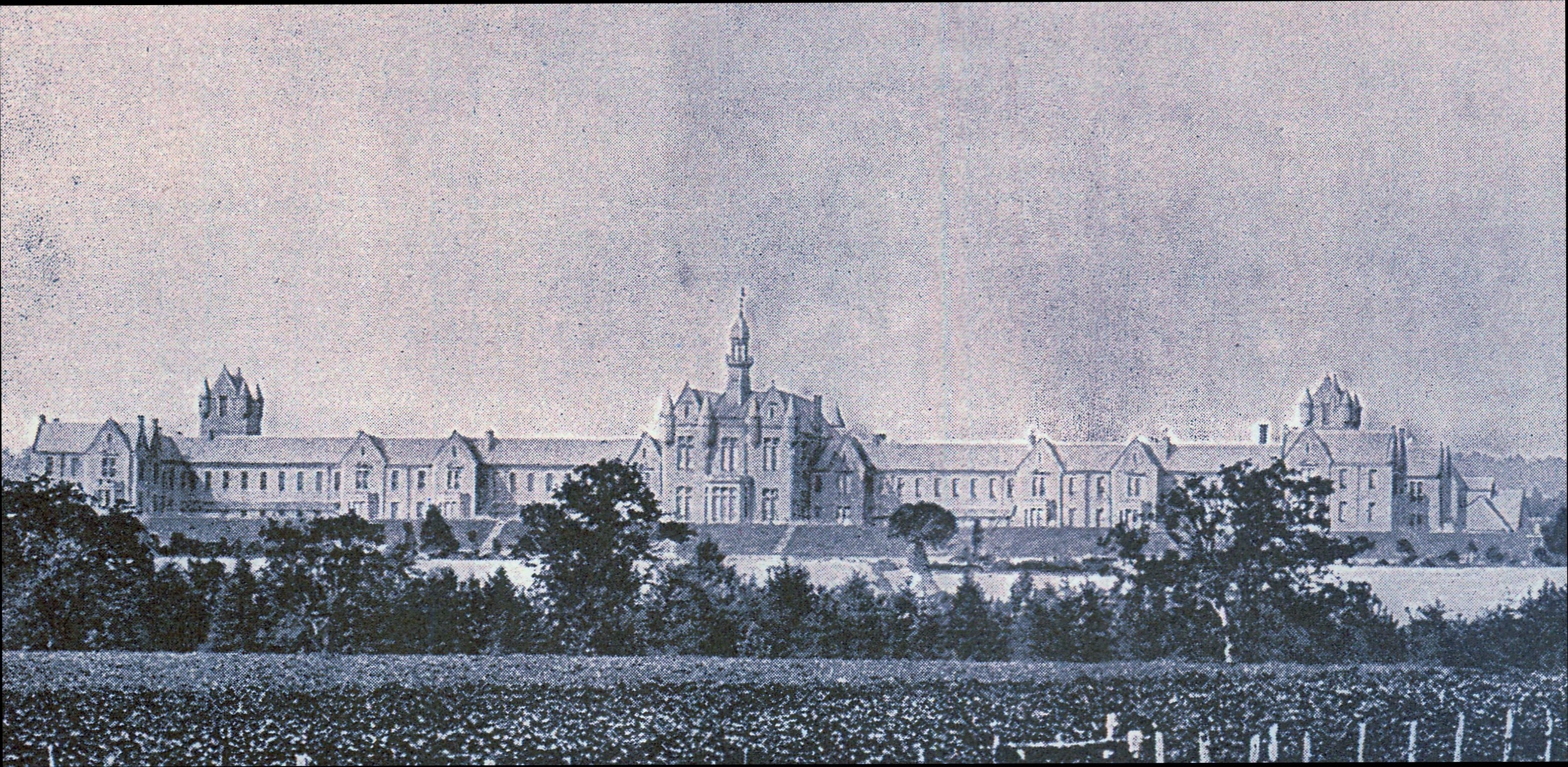
The hospital in 1897

Dundee Lunatic Asylum grew out of Dundee Infirmary which had opened in 1798. The issue of "provision for the insane" had been one the directors of the Infirmary had discussed for some time and in 1796 they had "felt obliged to lodge a lunatic for short time in one of the low rooms of the Infirmary, then in the course of erection". Eventually it was decided that an asylum should not be part of the same building as the Infirmary, but a separate project. In 1812 the Infirmary passed the project on to a separate body, although it was agreed the Governors of the Infirmary would elect 8 of their number to serve on this body. This arrangement would continue until the advent of the National Health Service in 1948. The 1819 royal charter granted to the Infirmary would refer to it as the Dundee Infirmary and Asylum, but made clear that the Asylum and Infirmary were separate bodies.

The foundation stone for the new asylum building, funded by public subscription, was laid in Albert Street on 3 September 1812, following a procession through Dundee. Subscribers included W T Baxter, who at the time was playing host to the young Mary Godwin. A bottle containing newspapers, coins, and a document explaining that the Asylum was intended "to restore the use of reason, to alleviate suffering, and lessen peril where reason cannot be restored." The Asylum's building was designed by the noted Scottish architect William Stark, but was not completed until 1819, some years after his death. The facility finally opened as the Dundee Lunatic Asylum in April 1820, initially housing three patients.

The Asylum was granted its own royal charter by Queen Victoria in 1875 and then became known as Dundee Royal Lunatic Asylum. By the mid-1870s the directors of the asylum were looking for a new and larger site outside the city and chose the 95 acres of Westgreen Farm, east of Liff and west of Camperdown. The laying of the foundation stone on 17 September 1879 was marked by an elaborate Masonic ceremony, involving a large procession of Freemasons and city dignitaries from Dundee. The new building, designed by the architects Edward and Robertson in the Scottish baronial style with a 600-foot frontage and a tower at each end, opened in October 1882. By 1897 there were in total 458 patients.

In January 1899 a new private patients' facility, designed to accommodate about 60 private patients, was erected to the south of the main building and placed under separate management, as the Royal Asylum. The main facility became the Dundee District Asylum in 1903 and at its peak housed 1,200 patients and operated the 247-acre Gourdie Farm to provide work for patients and generate fresh produce and milk. The main facility amalgamated with the private patients' facility to form the Dundee Royal Mental Hospital in 1959, with the psychiatric wards Maryfield Hospital also being transferred to the newly amalgamated facility. It went on to become the Royal Dundee Liff Hospital in 1963.

After the introduction of Care in the Community in the early 1980s, the hospital went into a period of decline and, once services had transferred to the Carseview Centre, a modern mental health facility established in the grounds of Ninewells Hospital, the Royal Dundee Liff Hospital closed in December 2001. The former main facility, which is now known as Greystanes House, and the former private patients' facility, which is now known as Gowrie House, were subsequently converted into apartments as part of a larger development known as West Green Park. The remaining Psychiatry of Old Age wards were transferred to Kingsway Care Centre in July 2013.

Two large murals depicting beach scenes by Alberto Morrocco are on the walls of the former dining room in the main building, not now normally accessible to the public. Morrocco, Head of the School of Painting at Duncan of Jordanstone College of Art and Design in Dundee, undertook them in the early 1960s at the request of Professor (later Sir) Ivor Batchelor, Physician Superintendent of Dundee Royal Mental Hospital and holder of the first Chair in Psychiatry at the University of Dundee.

An exhibition entitled 'Life at Liff: the mental health of Dundee' was held in the McManus Galleries, Dundee from 5 April to 16 June 2002.

The archives of the hospital are held by Archive Services at the University of Dundee.

== See also ==
- Dundee Royal Infirmary

== Sources ==
- Illsley, William Allen, ed. (1977). Third Statistical Account of Scotland: The County of Angus. Arbroath: The Herald Press.
- Sinclair, Sir John, ed. (1791). The Statistical Account of Scotland. Edinburgh: William Creech.
- Seventy-seventh Annual Report of the Directors of the Dundee Royal Asylum for Lunatics. Dundee: Winter, Duncan, & Co. 1897.
