= Crieff Community Hospital =

- NHS Tayside
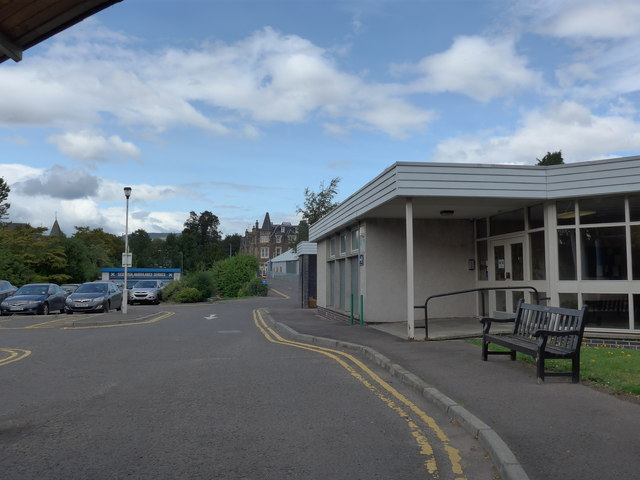
- The view from the hospital entrance

- Shown in Perth and Kinross

Geography
- Location: King Street, Crieff, Scotland
- Coordinates: 56.3702°N 3.8423°W

Organisation
- Care system: NHS Scotland
- Type: Community

Services
- Emergency department: No

History
- Founded: 1995

Links
- Lists: Hospitals in Scotland

Crieff Community Hospital is a health facility in King Street, Crieff, Scotland. It is managed by NHS Tayside.

== History ==
The facility was intended to replace the ageing Crieff Cottage Hospital on Pittenzie Street. It was designed by W. S. Atkins and opened 1995. It was sited conveniently close to the local GP-operated health centre which itself was replaced in 2001. Like other hospitals in remote areas in Scotland, Crieff Community Hospital has struggled to attract staff and started a programme of weekend closures in summer 2018.
