= Blairgowrie Community Hospital =

- NHS Tayside
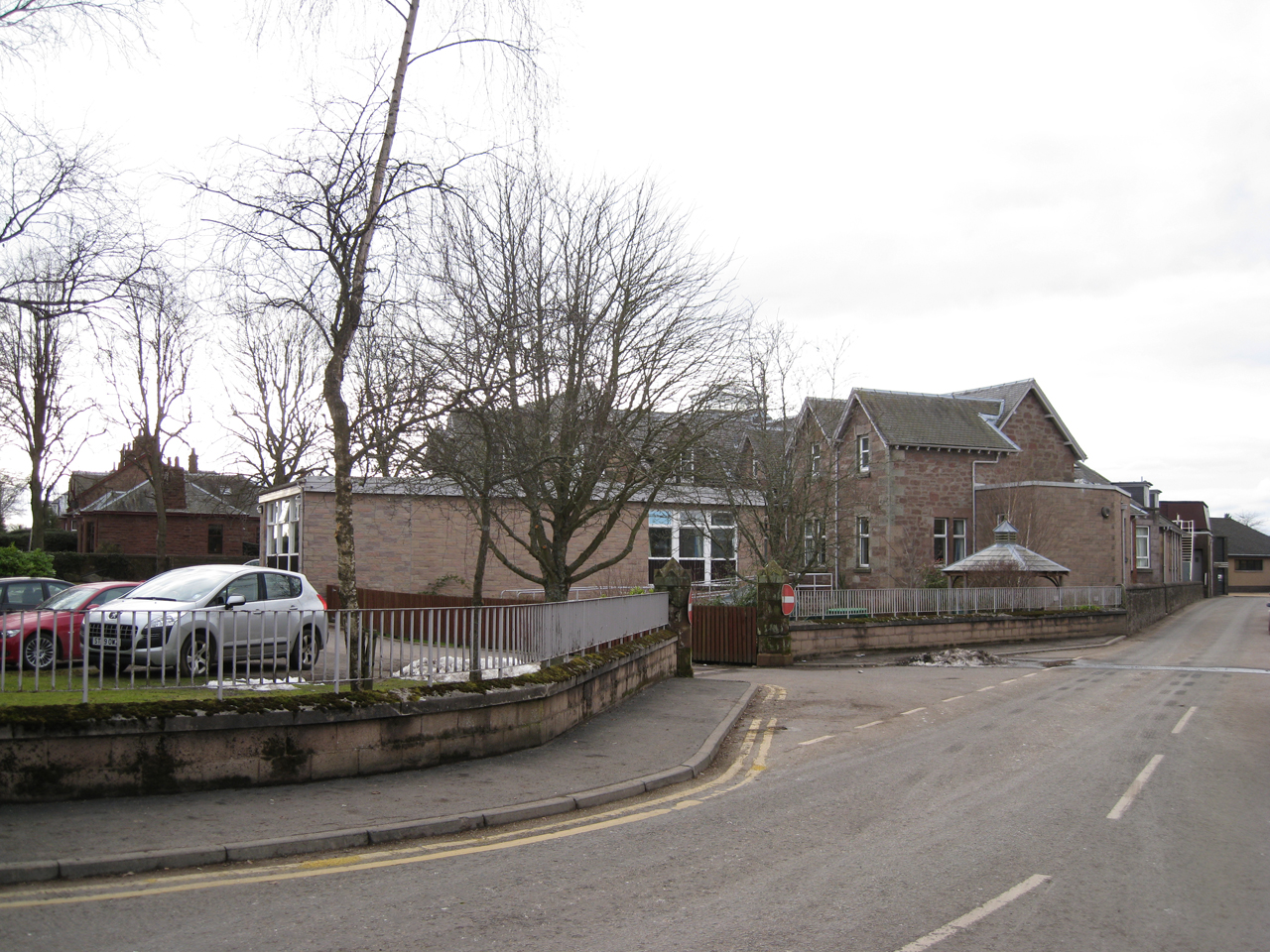
- Blairgowrie Community Hospital

- Shown in Perth and Kinross

Geography
- Location: Perth Road, Blairgowrie and Rattray, Scotland
- Coordinates: 56.5862°N 3.3453°W

Organisation
- Care system: NHS Scotland
- Type: Community

Services
- Emergency department: No

History
- Founded: 1901

Links
- Lists: Hospitals in Scotland

Blairgowrie Community Hospital is a health facility in Perth Road, Blairgowrie and Rattray, Scotland. It is managed by NHS Tayside.

== History ==
The first donation to the hospital was a legacy from Mrs Clerk-Rattray in 1882. Subsequently, Mrs Macpherson of Newton Castle gifted the site and further donations were then forthcoming. The facility, which was designed by L & J G Falconer, opened as Blairgowrie and Rattray Districts Cottage Hospital in May 1901. An additional wing was added in 1940 and, after joining the National Health Service in 1948, a GP unit was established on the site in 2014.
