= Murray Royal Hospital =

- NHS Tayside
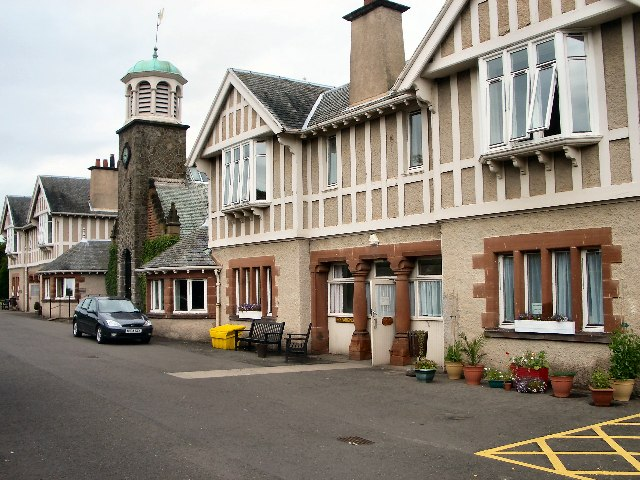
- The chapel and flanking villas built in 1904

Geography
- Location: Perth, Perth and Kinross, Scotland, United Kingdom
- Coordinates: 56.3998°N 3.4181°W

Organisation
- Care system: NHS Scotland
- Type: Specialist

Services
- Emergency department: No
- Speciality: Mental health

History
- Founded: 1828 (198 years ago)

Links
- Website: Official website

The Murray Royal Hospital is a mental-health facility in Perth, Scotland. It is managed by NHS Tayside. The original main building is a Category A listed building.

== History ==
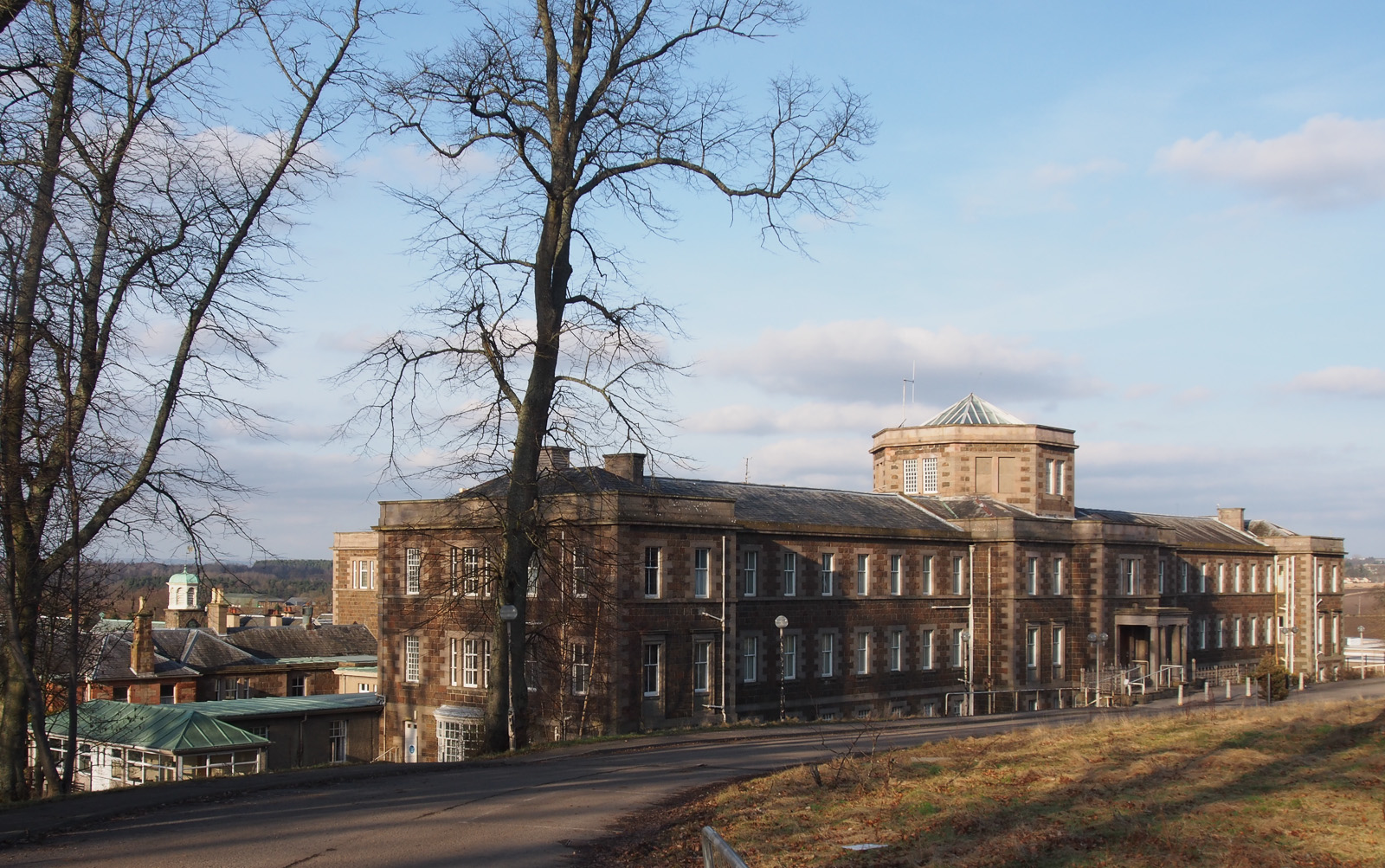
The original main building of 1828

The hospital arose from a bequest by James Murray, a local man who had inherited considerable wealth after his half brother died at sea. The facility, which was designed by William Burn in the neoclassical style using a corridor plan layout, opened as James Murray's Royal Lunatic Asylum in 1828.

Additional wings, designed by Burn, were added in 1833 and Pitcullen House, a neighbouring property, was acquired for use as a superintendent's residence in 1849. More wings, this time designed by Andrew Heiton Junior, were added in 1888 and a chapel and two flanking half-timbered villas were added in 1904. The hospital joined the National Health Service as James Murray's Royal Mental Hospital in 1948.

After the introduction of Care in the Community in the early 1980s, the hospital went into a period of decline and such a large facility was no longer necessary: a modern facility, designed by Atkins and built by Morgan Sindall and Robertson Group at a cost of £75 million on the same site, opened in June 2012. The new facilities include the Rohallion Secure Care Clinic which incorporates both a low secure unit and a medium secure unit.

The archives of the hospital are held by Archive Services at the University of Dundee.

== See also ==
- List of listed buildings in Perth, Scotland
