= NHS Tayside =

NHS board based in Dundee, Scotland

- Type: NHS board
- Established: 2006
- Headquarters: Ninewells Hospital; Dundee; DD1 9SY
- Region served: Angus; Dundee City; Perth and Kinross
- Population: 400,000
- Hospitals: Arbroath Infirmary; Blairgowrie Community Hospital; Carseview Centre; Crieff Community Hospital; Dundee Dental Hospital; King's Cross Hospital; Kingsway Care Centre; Murray Royal Hospital; Ninewells Hospital; Royal Victoria Hospital; Perth Royal Infirmary; Pitlochry Community Hospital; St Margaret's Hospital, Auchterarder; Stracathro Hospital; Tayside Children's Hospital; Whitehills Hospital, Forfar
- Staff: 14,000
- Website: www.nhstayside.scot.nhs.uk

NHS Tayside is an NHS board which forms one of the fourteen regions of NHS Scotland. It provides healthcare services in Angus, the Dundee City council area and Perth and Kinross. NHS Tayside is headquartered at Ninewells Hospital in Dundee; one of the largest hospitals in the world.

It has three Health and Social Care Partnerships (HSCPs): Angus, Dundee City and Perth and Kinross.

== Performance ==
In July 2020 the board announced that it had achieved the Scottish Government’s 2024 target of a 90% reduction in prevalence of hepatitis C, after 1970 people were diagnosed and treated, making it the first region in the world to effectively eliminate the virus.

It signed a five-year agreement with Alcidion to deploy Miya Observations, an electronic monitoring system which alerts clinical staff when patients show signs of deterioration, in 2022.

== History ==
NHS Tayside was originally formed as Tayside Health Board in April 1974. It replaced the Eastern Regional Hospital Board, which itself had been created in July 1948 as a result of the creation of the National Health Service, as having the responsibility for managing hospital provision in Dundee, Angus and Perth and Kinross (the Eastern Regional Hospital Board had also had some responsibility for hospitals in north and east Fife). It also took over the functions of Dundee Mental Hospitals (Board of Management), which had been formed in 1948 to administer mental health provision within Dundee.

It was organised into three Community Health Partnerships (CHPs): Angus, Dundee and Perth, which were replaced by health and social Care Partnerships that became fully operational in April 2016.

As of 2017 it is responsible for the governance of 3 major hospitals, several community hospitals and over 60 GP surgeries and other health centres. These employ over 30,000 staff.

=== Change of administrators ===
In April 2018 a new chairman and chief executive were appointed to run NHS Tayside as a "special measure" by the Scottish Government, after Health Secretary Shona Robison said there were concerns about whether NHS Tayside could manage its own finances.

=== Eljamel scandal ===
Sam Eljamel worked under NHS Tayside as Head of Neurosurgery at Ninewells Hospital in Dundee from 1995 until 2013. Eljamel faced serial allegations of malpractice and is alleged to have harmed up to 200 patients during botched and unnecessary operations. In 2022 an internal Scottish Government report stated that NHS Tayside repeatedly let patients down with failures in the way Eljamel was supervised and in their communication with patients. In April 2023, then-Minister for Public Health Michael Matheson launched an independent review of NHS Tayside in relation to Eljamel. A public inquiry was announced in September of that year, to be headed by Judge Lord Weir.

The public inquiry opened in November 2025, hearing evidence that NHS Tayside had destroyed 40 operating theatre logbooks covering the period Eljamel had practised at Ninewells Hospital, despite a "do not destroy" order being in place, which was described by the inquiry's senior counsel, Jamie Dawson KC, as a potential breach of the Inquiries Act 2005.

== Archives ==
The archives of NHS Tayside and its predecessors are held by Archive Services, University of Dundee. The archives include many records relating to many of the former and current hospitals located in the Tayside area. They also include records of defunct hospitals including Dundee Royal Infirmary, Maryfield Hospital and Murthly Hospital.

== Hospitals ==
=== Angus ===
- Arbroath Infirmary
- Stracathro Hospital, Brechin
- Whitehills Hospital, Forfar

=== Dundee City council area ===
- Carseview Centre
- Dundee Dental Hospital
- King's Cross Hospital
- Kingsway Care Centre
- Ninewells Hospital (includes University of Dundee Medical School)
- Royal Victoria Hospital (Dundee)
- Tayside Children's Hospital

=== Perth and Kinross ===
==== Within Perth ====
- Murray Royal Hospital
- Perth Royal Infirmary

==== Outwith Perth ====
- Blairgowrie Community Hospital
- Crieff Community Hospital
- Pitlochry Community Hospital
- St Margaret's Hospital, Auchterarder
