= St Margaret's Hospital, Auchterarder =

St Margaret's Hospital
- NHS Tayside
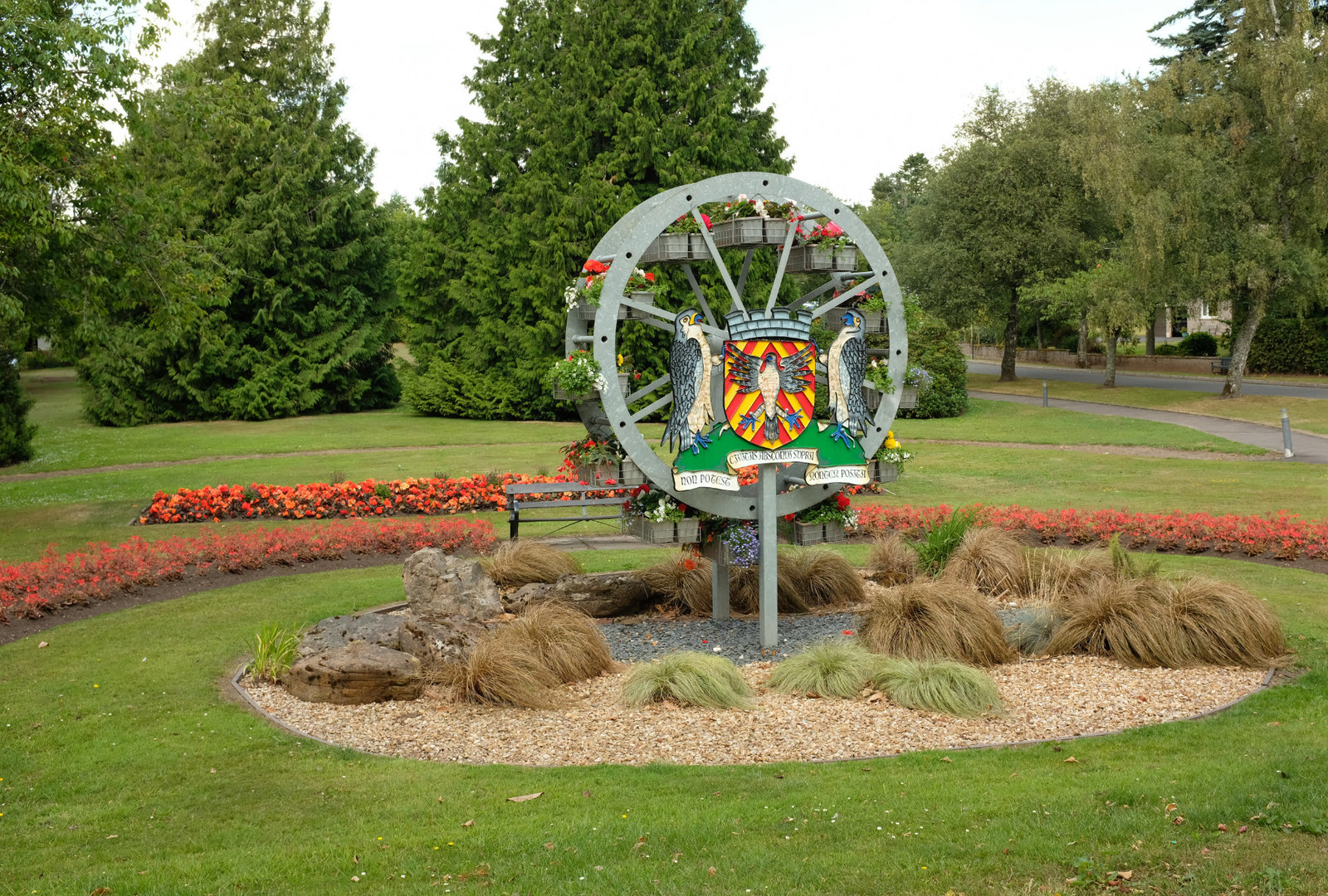
- Auchterarder Town Crest on display in the gardens of St Margaret's Hospital

- Shown in Perth and Kinross

Geography
- Location: Western Road, Auchterarder, Scotland
- Coordinates: 56.2933°N 3.7185°W

Organisation
- Care system: NHS Scotland
- Type: Community

Services
- Emergency department: No

History
- Founded: 1926

Links
- Lists: Hospitals in Scotland

St Margaret's Hospital is a health facility in Western Road, Auchterarder, Scotland. It is managed by NHS Tayside. It is a Category B listed building.

== History ==
The facility was financed by a gift from Andrew Thomson Reid (1863-1940) of Auchterarder House. It was intended to be a memorial to his father, who had founded the Hyde Park Locomotive Works in Glasgow, and his mother. It was designed by Stewart & Paterson and opened in 1926. After joining the National Health Service in 1948, an outpatients clinic was added in 1950.
