= Ninewells Hospital =

- NHS Tayside
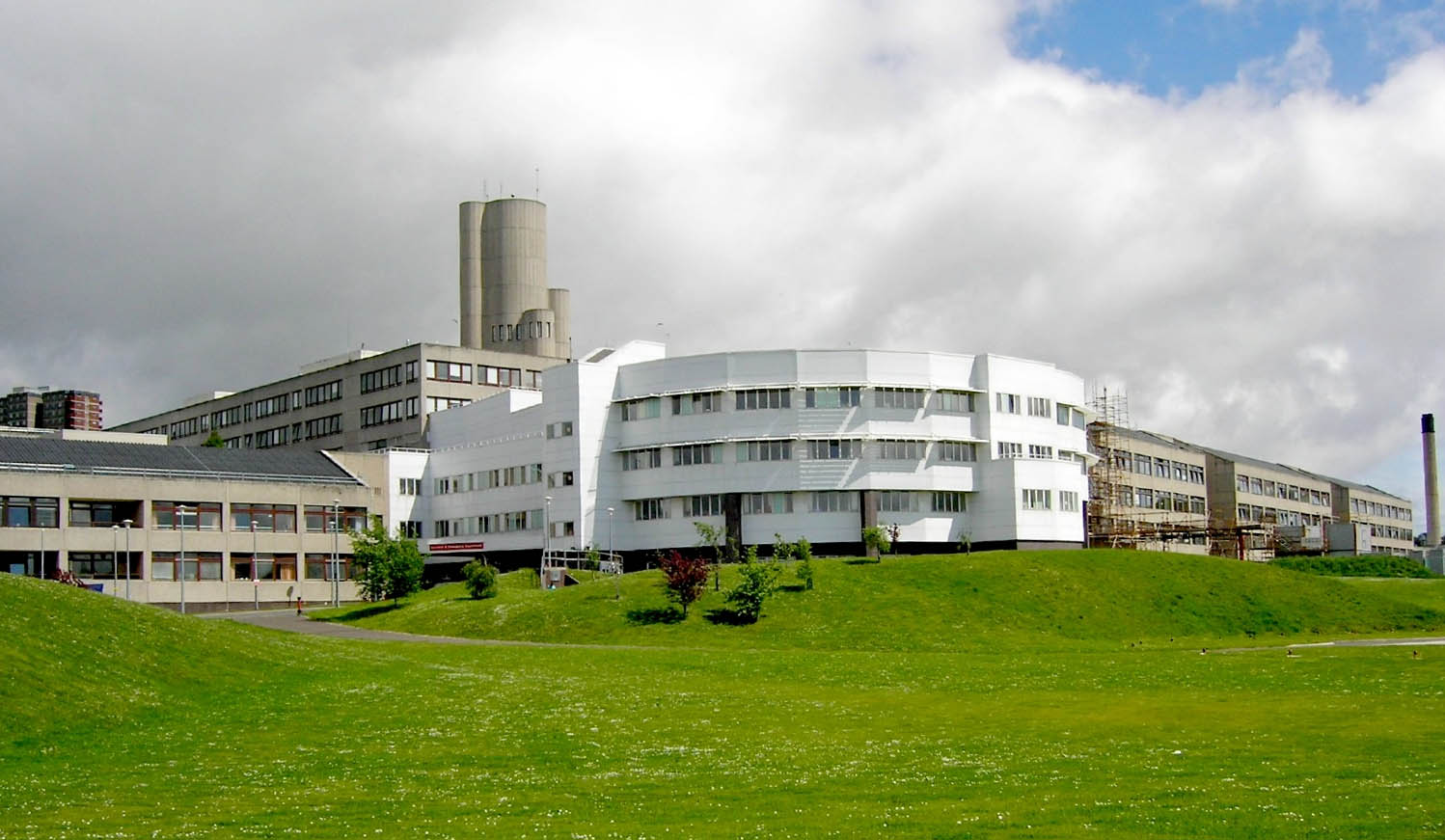

- Shown in Dundee

Geography
- Location: Dundee, Scotland
- Coordinates: 56°27′50.03″N 3°2′16.35″W

Organisation
- Care system: NHS Scotland
- Type: Teaching
- Affiliated university: University of Dundee; Abertay University; Robert Gordon University

Services
- Emergency department: Yes – Major Trauma Centre
- Beds: 862

History
- Founded: 23 October 1974; 52 years ago

Links
- Website: Official website
- Lists: Hospitals in Scotland

Ninewells Hospital is a large teaching hospital, based on the western edge of Dundee, Scotland. It is internationally renowned for introducing laparoscopic surgery to the UK as well as being a leading centre in developing fields such as the management of cancer, medical genetics and robotic surgery. Within the UK, it is also a major NHS facility for psychosurgery. The medical school was ranked first in the UK in 2009. The hospital has nursing and research links with the University of Dundee and is managed by NHS Tayside.

== History ==
The proposal for the new hospital was put forward in May 1960 and final permission was accepted by Parliament in February 1962. The first phase of the project was due to take six years at a cost of £9 million. Designed by Robert Matthew Johnson-Marshall and partners, the protracted construction began in August 1964. The hospital was initially designed to hold 800 beds, and the ward units were planned on the 'race track' principle. The foundation stone was laid on 9 September 1965, by Lord Hughes. The infirmary was built onto the side of a hill and the practicalities of the design were influenced by airport check in. Phase I of the building was completed in 1973, although some sections were not finished until 1975. The final cost was estimated as £25 million. Hospital admittances started on 31 January 1974 and the hospital was officially opened by the Queen Elizabeth The Queen Mother on 23 October 1974. At the opening ceremony, she stated "nothing that science can devise, nor money provide, will be lacking for the treatment of the patients". Computerised systems were used, most extensively in the laboratories, with programmes written in Dundee.

By 1986, the hospital employed over 5,000 people and had 830 beds over 39 wards. At that time, the total annual cost of patient care was said to be £22 million.

The opening of Ninewells had a major impact upon Dundee's existing hospitals. Dundee Royal Infirmary, which had opened in 1798 and moved to larger premises in the 1850s, had been Dundee's main hospital until the opening of Ninewells. From 1974, many of its functions and responsibilities were transferred to Ninewells and the infirmary ultimately closed in 1998. Maryfield Hospital, which had formerly been the East Poorhouse, was closed to patients in stages between 1974 and 1976 as a result of the opening of Ninewells. In the 1990s and 2000s, many functions of the city's King's Cross Hospital were also transferred to Ninewells. In 2001, a new psychiatric unit opened in the grounds of the hospital taking over some of the functions of Royal Dundee Liff Hospital.

The pediatric department of the hospital was redeveloped and officially re-opened as the Tayside Children's Hospital in June 2006. In 2016, the hospital became one of the four major trauma centres in Scotland.

The archives of the hospital are held by Archive Services, University of Dundee. The same archive also has a collection of microfilm copies of plans and documents relating to the construction of the hospital by Robert Matthew Johnson-Marshall & Partners.

Roads within the hospital grounds include Tom McDonald Avenue, named after a former Lord Provost of Dundee; Wurzburg Court, named after Dundee's twin city; and Kirsty Semple Way, named after a pioneering local doctor.

== Services ==
As of March 2014, the hospital had 862 staffed beds. In addition to the hospital, there is a teaching section that includes the medical school and the nursing school of the University of Dundee. As such, it was the second purpose built medical school in UK, and has garnered a reputation for excellence in academic research. In particular, the hospital has one of the world's leading leukemia research units.

== Tayside Children's Hospital ==
Tayside Children's Hospital is a children's hospital located within Ninewells Hospital. It serves children, aged from birth up until their fourteenth birthday, who live in Dundee, Angus, Perth and Kinross and north east Fife; as such, it was so named after a region rather than a city to reflect the wide area that it covers.

== Maggie's Dundee ==
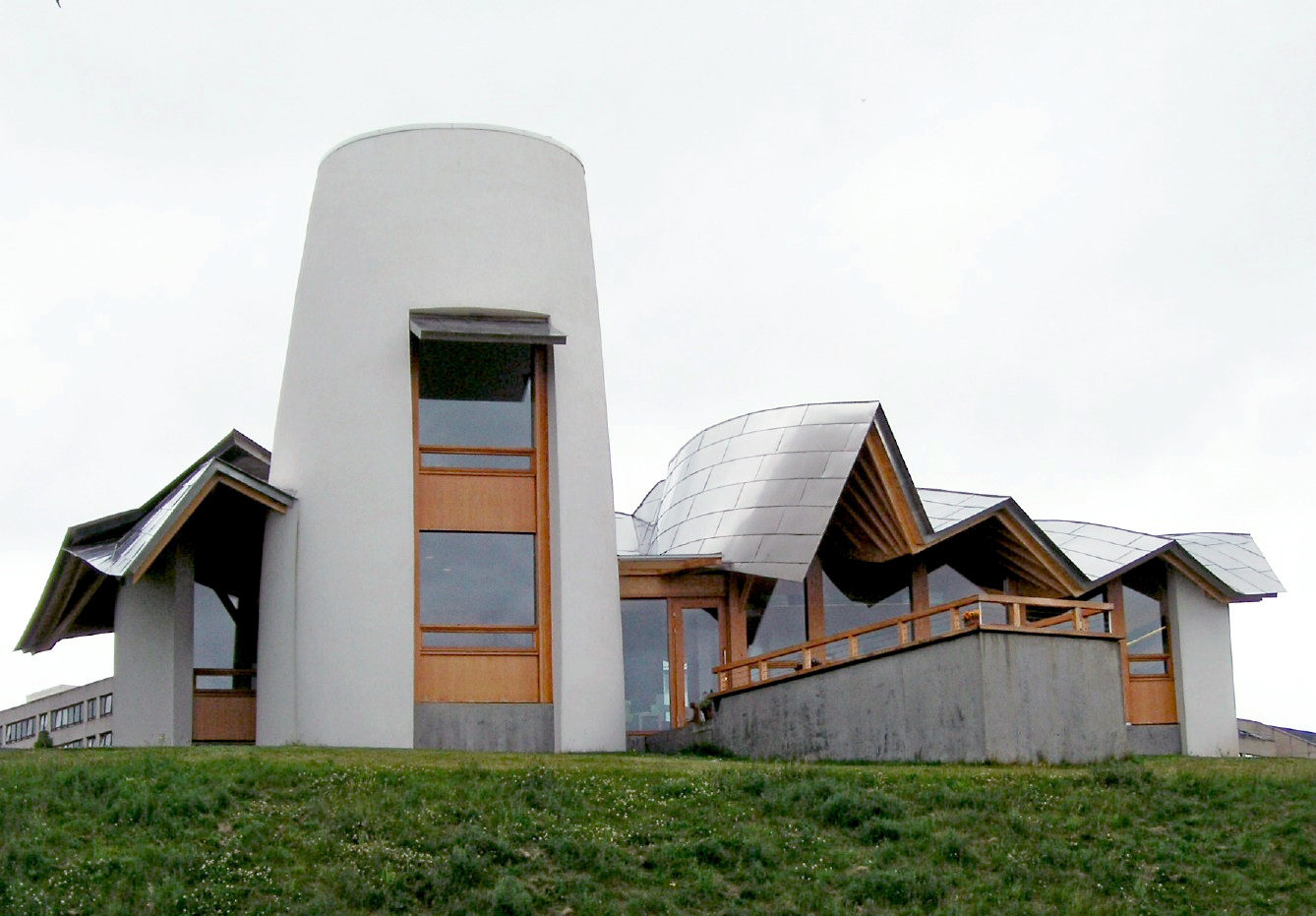
Maggie's Centre at Ninewells Hospital

On the Ninewells site, there is also a Maggie's Centre building, intended as a calming and accommodating place to support patients and their families. The building was designed by architect Frank Gehry, in conjunction with James F Stephen. It occupies a hilltop position which enhances the building's sculptural form when viewed from the approach road. The structure was the first new-build commissioned by the cancer support organisation. It was officially opened by Bob Geldof on 25 September 2003. Maggie's Dundee was named as the Royal Fine Art Commission's building of the year in 2004.

A garden with a labyrinth design by Arabella Lennox-Boyd and other landscaped features were added in 2008. In the first ten years, around 100,000 people had passed through its doors.

== Ninewells Cancer Campaign ==
The Ninewells Cancer Campaign was set up in 1990 following a successful CAT Scan fundraising appeal. The campaign was founded by Dr Pat McPherson, who worked closely with Dr Jacqui Wood, who chaired the campaign from 1991, until her own death from cancer in 2011. She was succeeded as chair by Lady Fiona Fraser. Collaboration between the Ninewells Cancer Campaign and DC Thomson led to the use of Dennis the Menace as the campaign's mascot, with the slogan "Help Dennis Beat the Menace". The campaign has raised over £17 million to fund equipment and research into cancer. The campaign successfully raised £2 million to fund the creation and equipping of the Jacqui Wood Cancer Centre, a research centre established at the University of Dundee's Medical School at the hospital. The campaign continues to raise funds to support the research work being undertaken at the centre.
