= Timeline of Dundee history =

The timeline of Dundee history shows the significant events in the history of Dundee, Scotland.

== 1100–1799 ==
- 1190 – Dundee Parish Church established.
- 1200 – William the Lion deeds his younger brother David, Earl of Huntingdon superiority over Dundee and its port.
- 1239 – The High School of Dundee opens.
- 1296 – Dundee Castle surrendered to the English.
- 1297 – William Wallace besieges and captures Dundee Castle.
- 1298 – Alexander Scrymgeour appointed keeper of Dundee Castle by William Wallace.
- 1306 – Dundee Castle retaken by the English.
- 1313 – Dundee Castle destroyed by Robert the Bruce.
- 1385 – John of Gaunt & the English captured and partially destroyed the town.
- 1465 – Birth of Hector Boece a Scottish philosopher and historian.
- 1518 – Birth of James Halyburton the Scottish Reformer and provost of the town for 33 years.
- 1564 – The Howff (a burial ground) established.
- 1580 – Dudhope Castle extended.
- 1645 – Population of Dundee estimated to be 11,200.
- 1651 – Siege of Dundee: George Monck besieges and sacks the town on the orders of Oliver Cromwell.
- 1684 – John Graham of Claverhouse, 1st Viscount Dundee became constable.
- 1732 – Birth of George Dempster of Dunnichen an advocate, landowner and politician.
- 1759 – Birth of William Playfair, inventor of graphical methods of statistics including the line, area and bar chart.
- 1795 - Birth of William Lyon Mackenzie, a journalist and politician who became the first mayor of Toronto in 1834, playing a key role in its establishment as a city, and later led a failed rebellion in Upper Canada in 1837.
- 1797 – James Keiller & Son, a jam and marmalade factory, is established.
- 1798 – Dundee Infirmary opens in King Street.

== 1800–1899 ==
- 1801 – The Courier established as the Dundee, Perth and Cupar Advertiser.
- 1812 – Mary Shelley moves to Dundee from London. Her time in the city influences her writing, eventually inspiring her to write Frankenstein.
- 1819 – Dundee Infirmary granted royal charter and renamed "Dundee Royal Infirmary and Asylum".
- 1820 – Dundee Asylum formally established as a separate entity from Dundee Royal Infirmary and opened in premises in Albert Street.
- 1825 – Walter Scott writes Bonnie Dundee a poem and song in honour of John Graham, 1st Viscount Dundee.
- 1831 – Dundee and Newtyle Railway opens.
- 1834 – James Chalmers publicly exhibits the adhesive postage stamp.
- 1835
  - 25 July: James Bowman Lindsay demonstrates a constant electric light at a public meeting at the city's Thistle Hall.
  - First jute cargos arrive in Dundee beginning the city's jute trade.
- 1836 – St Andrew's Cathedral completed.
- 1838 – Dundee and Arbroath Railway opens.
- 1839 – James Chalmers submits his adhesive postage stamp proposal to the UK Government.
- 1847 - Dundee and Perth Railway opens.
- 1849 - The construction of Camperdown Works begins.
- 1851 – St Mary, Our Lady of Victories Church opens.
- 1853 – Royal Arch, built to celebrate a visit by Queen Victoria, is completed.
- 1855 - New Dundee Royal Infirmary opened in Barrack Road, replacing King Street building.
- 1855 – St Paul's Cathedral completed.
- 1857 – Birth of Williamina Fleming, an astronomer who discovered the Horsehead Nebula and white dwarf stars, and catalogued hundreds of stars.
- 1860 - Dundee Convalescent Hospital opened in Union Place.
- 1863 – Baxter Park opens.
- 1864 – Thomas John MacLagan begins working at Dundee Royal Infirmary, where his use of salicin to treat patients lays the groundwork for the development of aspirin.
- 1867 – The McManus Art Gallery and Museum opens as the Albert Institute.
- 1870 – Balgay Hill and Victoria Park were acquired by the City as public parks.
- 1871 – Legislation for slum clearing was established with the City Improvement Act.
- 1878 – First Tay Rail Bridge opens.
- 1879 - Foundation stone laid for new home of Dundee Royal Asylum at Liff. The institution will completely transfer there from the site in Albert Street by October 1882.
- 1879 – Tay Bridge Disaster: The Tay Rail Bridge collapses killing around 75 people.
- 1881 – University of Dundee established as University College, Dundee by deed of endowment.
- 1885 – Harris Academy, Dundee’s first public school, opens to pupils.
- 1887 – Second Tay Rail Bridge opens.
- 1888 – Abertay University established as Dundee Institute of Technology.
- 1889
  - Dundee becomes the first Scottish city to be granted city status.
  - King's Cross Hospital opens as a fever hospital for patients suffering from infectious diseases.
- 1891 – Population of Dundee estimated to be 153,587.
- 1893 – The East Poorhouse Hospital, which will later become Maryfield Hospital, opens as a hospital for the poor.
- 1897 – Dundee Women's Hospital opens.
- 1899 – Royal Victoria Hospital opens as the Victoria Hospital for Incurables.

== 1900–1999 ==
- 1901
  - Population of Dundee estimated to be 161,173.
  - RRS Discovery, the world’s first purpose built scientific research ship is built and launched.
  - SS Californian, known for its inaction during the sinking of the RMS Titanic in 1912, is launched.
- 1905 – DC Thomson is established.
- 1906 – 1906 Dundee fire: a large fire breaks out in a warehouse storing whisky.
- 1909 – Dundee United F.C. forms as Dundee Hibernian.
- 1914 – Dundee Dental Hospital opens.
- 1915
  - Dundee Women's Hospital moves to a new building in Elliot Road.
  - The 4th (City of Dundee) Battalion Black Watch sustains significant losses at the Battle of Loos.
- 1918 – Association of Jute Spinners and Manufacturers founded in Dundee, initially to protect the prices of its members' products.
- 1919 - The Kingsway opens to the public, becoming the first ring road system in the UK.
- 1920 - Several of Dundee's leading jute firms including Cox Brothers, Gilroy and Sons and J. and A. D. Grimond are amalgamated as Jute Industries Ltd.
- 1923 – The Caird Hall concert auditorium formally opened by Edward, Prince of Wales.
- 1925 – War memorial opens at the summit of Dundee Law.
- 1933 – Dundee City Chambers opens.
- 1935 – Mills Observatory opens.
- 1936 – Green's Playhouse opens.
- 1938 – The Beano is first published by DC Thomson.
- 1939 - Dundee Repertory Theatre founded, initially based in Nicoll Street.
- 1946
  - Camperdown Country Park opens.
  - A twinning agreement is established between Dundee and Orleans, France. Dundee’s first twin city.
- 1959 — Dundee and Zadar, Croatia become twin cities.
- 1962 — Dundee twins with Alexandria, Virginia in the United States and Würzburg in Germany.
- 1963
  - Royal Arch, built to celebrate a visit by Queen Victoria, is demolished.
  - Dundee Repertory Theatre's premises at Nicoll Street is destroyed in a fire.
  - Dundee Airport opens.
  - "Beatlemania" is coined for the first time at The Beatles' concert at the Caird Hall.
- 1966 – Tay Road Bridge opens.
- 1967 – University of Dundee gains independent status.
- 1974 – Ninewells Hospital opens.
- 1978
  - The Wellgate Centre opens.
  - Dundee Synagogue opens.
- 1979 – Amorphous silicon thin-film transistors (TFTs) are developed by Walter Spear and Peter LeComber at the University of Dundee, paving the way for the global development of laptops, flat-screen TVs, smartphones, and tablets.
- 1980
  - Scottish League Cup Final takes place at Dens Park.
  - Dundee and Nablus, Palestine become twin cities.
- 1982 – New Dundee Repertory Theatre opens.
- 1984 – DMA Design is established.
- 1986 – RRS Discovery returns to Dundee from London.
- 1991 – Lemmings is released by DMA Design.
- 1993
  - Timex strike: Industrial dispute between workers and management takes place over seven months resulting in the closure of the factory and the loss of hundreds of jobs.
  - Discovery Point, a visitor centre dedicated to the RRS Discovery, opens.
- 1994 – Abertay University gains university status.
- 1996 – Verdant Works Museum opens.
- 1997
  - The world's first computer games design degree is introduced at Abertay University.
  - Grand Theft Auto is first released by DMA Design.
  - Green's Playhouse is rebuilt after a fire and operates as a Mecca Bingo Hall.
- 1998
  - Dundee Royal Infirmary closes.
  - Last jute cargo arrives in Dundee bringing an end to the city's jute trade.
- 1999 – Dundee Contemporary Arts Centre opens.

== 2000–present ==
- 2000
  - Dundee Central Mosque opens.
  - Dundee Science Centre opens.
  - Dundee International Book Prize established.
  - The Overgate Centre opens.
- 2001
  - The Dundee Waterfront project launches with the aim of transforming the city's waterfront by 2031.
  - 2001 Morgan Academy fire: A fire engulfs Morgan Academy and results in pupils and staff to be decanted to the former Rockwell High School site. The damaged school is then repaired and reopened in 2004.
- 2004 – Dundee and Dubai, United Arab Emirates become twin cities.
- 2006
  - The world's first ethical hacking degree is introduced at Abertay University.
  - Radio 1's Big Weekend takes place at Camperdown Country Park.
- 2007 – Scottish Challenge Cup Final takes place in Dens Park.
- 2009 – Dundee International Submarine Memorial dedicated.
- 2010
  - Dundee Museum of Transport is established.
  - Winter of 2010–11: A major thundersnow storm occurs in Dundee, resulting between 8 and 10 inches of snow falling rapidly, accompanied by thunder, lightning, and fierce winds, described as “the perfect storm”
- 2011
  - DUNDEAD, a horror film festival hosted by Dundee Contemporary Arts, launches.
  - Dundee House, the headquarters of the city council, opens.
- 2013
  - Dundee is shortlisted for the UK City of Culture in 2017, but loses out to Hull.
  - Dundee Culture is established.
  - Dundee and West Dundee in the United States become twin cities.
- 2014
  - Dundee is granted UNESCO City of Design status, the first city in the UK to receive the designation.
  - The University of Dundee's Discovery Centre opens.
- 2015
  - A memorial for Mary Slessor is unveiled outside the Steeple Church in Dundee’s Nethergate area on the 100th anniversary of her death.
  - Dundee Museum of Transport successfully purchases the Maryfield Tram Depot to transform it into a new museum.
  - The Scottish Traditional Music Awards and the ISAM International Congress are hosted in Dundee at the Caird Hall for the first time.
- 2016
  - Beano Studios is established by DC Thomson.
  - The Scottish Traditional Music Awards are hosted at the Caird Hall for the second time.
- 2017
  - Dundee International Book Prize disestablished.
  - Carnival 56, Dundee’s own music festival, takes place at Camperdown Country Park, but it is scrapped after one year.
  - Dundee bids to be European Capital of Culture for 2023, but due to Brexit, the bid is terminated.
- 2018
  - Dundee Pride is established and the city's first pride event is held.
  - The Dundee Design Parade is established.
  - Dundee's new railway station concourse opens.
  - V&A Dundee opens.
- 2019 – Dundee Synagogue closes.
- 2020
  - NHS Tayside announces that they have "effectively eliminated" hepatitis C.
  - BBC Radio 1's Big Weekend, scheduled to be hosted at Camperdown Country Park, is cancelled as a result of the COVID-19 pandemic.
  - Plans for an Eden Project visitor attraction are revealed for Dundee.
  - Camperdown Golf Course closes amid cuts by Dundee City Council.
  - Rockstar Dundee is established after Ruffian Games is taken over by Rockstar Games, marking the game company’s return to Dundee for the first time in 21 years.
  - Debenhams close their department store in the Overgate Centre.
- 2021
  - Dundee is named as the UK's only "City of the Future" by Cognizant.
  - The Caird Hall operates as a mass COVID‑19 vaccination centre in February under the direction of NHS Tayside and delivered around 135,000 vaccine doses before it closed in September.
  - Emanata Studios is established as a division of Beano Studios by DC Thomson.
- 2022
  - 2022 Kirkton riot: Disturbance takes place in the Kirkton area of the city which leads to multiple arrests.
  - Dundee, along with Perth and Fife form a bid to be UK City of Culture in 2025, but the bid does not get shortlisted.
  - The Scottish Traditional Music Awards is hosted at the Caird Hall for a third time.
  - The Dundee Hooley is first held.
- 2023
  - BBC Radio 1's Big Weekend takes place at Camperdown Country Park for the second time, after it was cancelled in 2020 due to the COVID-19 pandemic. Dundee becomes the first Scottish city to host the event twice.
  - The first Scottish Esports degree is introduced by Dundee and Angus College.
  - Ambassador Cruise Line announces Dundee as a home port for their new cruise liner, Ambition.
  - Mike Ashley purchases the Overgate Centre for approximately £30 million.
  - The 2012 RRS Discovery visits Dundee for the first time.
- 2024
  - Mills Observatory, Broughty Castle Museum and Caird Park Golf Course are earmarked for closure by Dundee City Council to cut costs. Mills Observatory is later saved from closure following a resurgence in visitor numbers whilst the decision on Broughty Castle Museum is deferred.
  - The Competitive Games Lab and Wacom Cintiq Lab opens at Abertay University, specialising in research and development in gaming, esports and digital art.
  - Planning permission is approved for Eden Project Dundee.
  - Plans to repurpose the Wellgate Centre into a new college campus operated by Dundee and Angus College are unveiled.
  - Dundee becomes the first city in Europe to implement a personalised cancer treatment based on an individual's immune system with a positive response reported by 2026 leading to scientists describing it as a "game changer".
- 2025
  - Broughty Castle Museum is given £50,000 of funding to continue operating for a year, after previously being earmarked for closure.
  - Mills Observatory records its 2024/25 season as its best on record and receives £5,000 of funding from Culture & Business Scotland to refurbish ahead of its 90th anniversary season.
  - University of Dundee reveals a £35 million deficit which resulted in 632 jobs being put under threat. The Scottish Government subsequently gives the university a £22 million bailout.
  - The CoSTAR Realtime Lab opens at Dundee’s waterfront, specialising in developing new technologies for TV, film and gaming.
  - LIVEHOUSE Dundee, a multi-purpose live entertainment venue opens at the former Green's Playhouse site.
  - Caird Park Golf Course closes following cuts from Dundee City Council.
  - Frasers opens up their new department store in the Overgate Centre, replacing Debenhams which closed in 2020.
  - The Dundee Book Festival and Dundee Music Festival is established.
  - The inaugural Dundee Economic Summit is held by the Dundee & Angus Chamber of Commerce.
  - University of Dundee principal Shane O'Neill resigns following an independent investigation which revealed financial mismanagement at the university.
  - Dundee hosts the Scottish Album of the Year Award for the first time at the Caird Hall in a role that the city will take up to 2027.
  - Doof in the Park, an EDM festival organised by Hannah Laing, is launched and takes place in Camperdown Country Park. A second edition for 2026 was announced shortly after the 2025 edition.
  - The PS Waverley returns to Dundee for the first time since 1984.
  - Dundee hosts the Scots Language Awards for the second time.
  - RRS Discovery marks 100 years as a designated Royal Research Ship. To celebrate, the 2012 RRS Discovery ship, named after the 1901 ship built in Dundee, returns to the city for the first time in two years.
  - Canadian singer Justin Bieber makes an unannounced visit to Dundee, where he films his music video for “Bad Honey” in a city centre bar.
  - The world’s first remote transatlantic stroke treatment is conducted by the University of Dundee.
- 2026
  - Dundee hosts the 37th European Cetacean Society Conference at LIVEHOUSE Dundee.
  - Hannah Laing announces the cancellation of Doof in the Park’s 2027 edition.
  - V&A Dundee becomes the first venue to host the V&A’s David Bowie on Tour exhibition.
- 2027
  - Dundee is set to host the International Festival of Stone.
  - V&A Dundee are set to host the UK’s first Vivienne Westwood exhibition.

== See also ==
- Dundee
- History of Dundee
- Timeline of Scottish history

== Notes ==
- Chisholm, Hugh, ed. (1910). "Dundee" . Encyclopædia Britannica. Vol. 8 (11th ed.). Cambridge University Press. pp. 674–676.
- Lynch, Michael (2001). The Oxford companion to Scottish history. Oxford: Oxford University Press. ISBN 0-19-211696-7.
