= Alexander Scrymgeour =

Alexander Scrymgeour may refer to:

- Alexander Scrymgeour, 12th Earl of Dundee (born 1949), Scottish peer and politician
- Alexander Scrymgeour (died 1306), Scottish knight who took part in the War of Scottish Independence
