= Stobswell =

Area of Dundee, Scotland

Coordinates: 56.470093°N 2.962495°W

Stobswell: Scottish Gaelic: An Stob, Stobaidh; Scots: Stobie
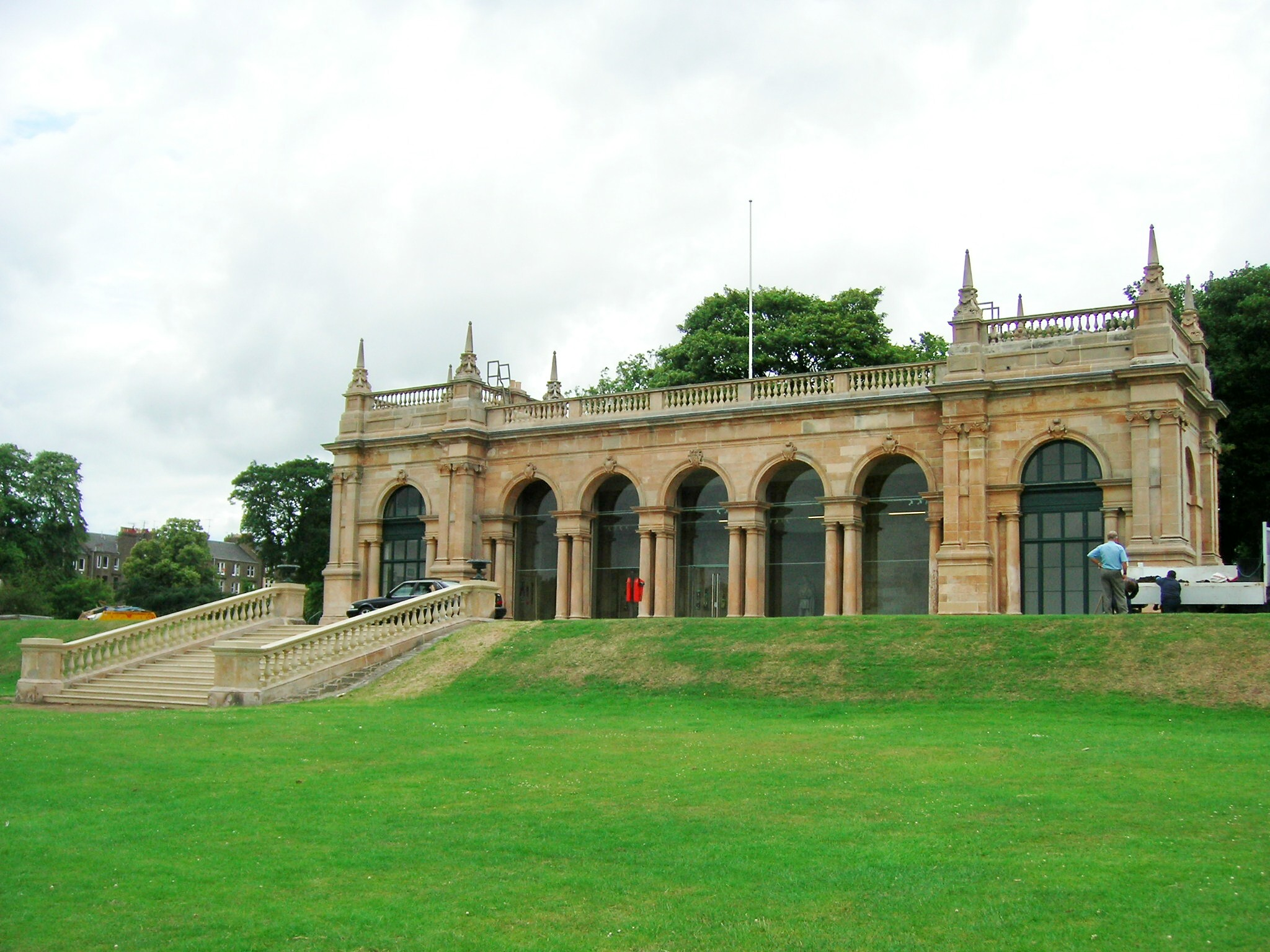
- Baxter Park Pavilion

- Location within Dundee City council area Location within Scotland
- Population: 9,963
- OS grid reference: NO408313
- Council area: Dundee City
- Lieutenancy area: Dundee
- Country: Scotland
- Sovereign state: United Kingdom
- Post town: DUNDEE
- Postcode district: DD4
- Dialling code: 01382
- Police: Scotland
- Fire: Scottish
- Ambulance: Scottish
- UK Parliament: Dundee Central
- Scottish Parliament: Dundee City East

Stobswell, locally known as Stobie (Scots pronunciation: [ˈstobe]), is a predominantly residential area of Dundee, Scotland, with a population of 9,963. Originally a small hamlet outside the city boundaries, Stobswell grew significantly during the Industrial Revolution to accommodate the city's rapidly expanding textile workforce.

== History ==
Housing was developed in the area by the city's "jute barons" in the 19th century to accommodate workers in the nearby mills. In 1856, the East Dundee Poorhouse was built on a two-acre (8,000 m^{2}) site in the area. After the inception of the National Health Service, the poorhouse was renamed The Rowans and later became a hospital and care home for the elderly.

The present Stobswell Church (itself a union of four local churches) was built in 1874. It operates as the local Church of Scotland parish church.

== Governance ==
Stobswell falls under the jurisdiction of Dundee City Council and is located within the Maryfield ward. At the community level, local civic engagement and events are driven by the Stobswell Forum, a group which advocates for community regeneration and manages the Baxter Park Centre. At the national level, the area is represented in the UK Parliament as part of the Dundee Central constituency, and in the Scottish Parliament within the Dundee City East constituency.

== Geography ==
Located in the central-eastern portion of the city, Stobswell is bordered by the Hilltown to the west and Maryfield to the north. The area is generally defined by major arterial roads, heavily utilising Clepington Road to the north and Albert Street to the west.

The urban geography is defined by its public green spaces, most notably Baxter Park. Designed by Sir Joseph Paxton, the historic Victorian park was comprehensively restored with Heritage Lottery funding and retains a Green Flag Award. Another notable geographical feature is the Stobsmuir Ponds, locally known as the "Swannie Ponds", situated near Pitkerro Road.

== Demographics ==
The local urban landscape is dominated by high-density housing, primarily consisting of traditional 19th-century sandstone tenements. The area operates as a self-sufficient local hub. Retail amenities are heavily concentrated along Albert Street, which functions as the primary commercial spine, offering shops and services as a central alternative to large-scale outer-city supermarkets. The area also retains a strong social scene, supported by a dense concentration of traditional public houses and local cafes.

== Education ==
Secondary education in the area is provided by Morgan Academy. The school operates from a prominent Category A listed building that originally opened in 1868 as Morgan Hospital, a charitable institution providing accommodation and education for "sons of tradesmen and persons of the working class." Local primary education includes Glebelands Primary School and Clepington Primary School. The Melrose Campus of the former Dundee College (now part of Dundee and Angus College) was also historically located in the area before its closure.

== Transport ==
Stobswell possesses a rich public transit history, highlighted by the Maryfield Tram Depot on Forfar Road. Built in 1901, the B-listed brick building is the last surviving structure from Dundee's original tram network. It is currently undergoing redevelopment to become the permanent, carbon-neutral home of the Dundee Museum of Transport.

Modern public transport relies heavily on the bus network, with operators such as Xplore Dundee providing high-frequency routes (including services 17, 32, and 33) that connect Stobswell to the city centre and Ninewells Hospital.

== Sports and recreation ==
The area is home to the Dundee International Sports Centre (D.I.S.C.), which hosted the European Hockey Championships in 1998. The local rugby club is Stobswell R.F.C., which plays at the McTaggart Sports Centre on Old Glamis Road.

The community hosts a number of annual events. The longest-established of these is the Celebration in the Park, a large-scale carnival which brings crowds to Baxter Park each August. Other notable gatherings include a winter Doggyfest, an annual motor show, and the week-long Stobfest in May.

== Notable residents ==
- In the summer of 1812, author Mary Shelley lived in the area with William Baxter, an acquaintance of her family. She developed a friendship with Baxter's two daughters, Christina and Isabel. The dunes, beaches, and barren hills near Dundee inspired Shelley, and she described this scenery in her novella Mathilda (written in 1819–1820).
- Craig Brewster, a Scottish former professional footballer and coach. Born in Stobswell, he notably scored the winning goal for Dundee United in the 1994 Scottish Cup Final.
- Doug Cowie, Scottish International football player who made a club-record 446 appearances for Dundee F.C. and won 20 full caps for the Scotland national team. He lived and raised his family in Stobswell during his playing career.
- Peter Lorimer, former Leeds United and Scotland football player, who scored an astonishing 176 goals in a single season while playing for Stobswell School and local YMCA teams.
- Billy Mackenzie, singer and frontman of The Associates.
- Jim Reid, prominent Scottish folk singer who was raised in Stobswell, spending most of his childhood on Baldovan Terrace.

== See also ==
- List of places in Dundee
- History of Dundee
