= Royal Arch, Dundee =

Royal Arch
- Interactive map of the Royal Arch area
- Alternative names: Victoria Arch

General information
- Completed: 1853
- Demolished: 1964
- Cost: £2,270-£3,000

Height
- Height: 17 metres

Design and construction
- Architect: James Leslie

The Royal Arch (also referred to as the Victoria Arch) was a structure erected in Dundee, Scotland, between 1849 and 1853 and demolished in 1964. The monumental archway formerly stood over the access to the pier between Earl Grey Dock and King William IV Dock on the city's waterfront.

== Background ==
The arch was built to commemorate a visit to the city by Queen Victoria and her husband, Prince Albert, in 1844. Victoria and Albert were on a visit to Duke of Atholl and his nephew, Lord Glenlyon. The royal boat landed near a triumphal arch erected for the occasion and the couple returned and embarked for London on 1 October 1844. It was the first visit by a British monarch to Dundee since the 17th century, although Victoria often visited the city during her reign because it was on her route to Balmoral Castle.

== Design, construction and demolition ==
The first arch, designed by harbour engineer James Leslie, was made out of wood. Following a design competition for a more permanent structure, John Thomas Rochead, designer of the Wallace Monument near Stirling, was commissioned to design a permanent sandstone monument to replace the wooden arch. The Royal Arch, commonly known in Dundee as the Victoria Arch, was described as being in the "Anglo-Norman" style and consisted of a large triumphal arch, flanked by two smaller side arches, surmounted by two central turrets. It was situated between King William IV Dock and Earl Grey Dock on the south side of Dock Street, between the junctions of Castle Street, and Whitehall Crescent. The structure was 80 feet (24 m) across. Costing between £2,270 and £3,000, it was mostly funded by public subscription and the harbour trustees.

The arch was demolished on 16 March 1964, as part of land reclamation work required for the construction of the Tay Road Bridge. The structure was dynamited, and the rubble deposited in both the King William IV and the Earl Grey Docks. Afterwards, the docks were land-filled to accommodate the slip roads for the new road bridge.

== Legacy ==
Fragments of the arch were uncovered while the waterfront was being redeveloped in 2010, and its foundations were uncovered in 2014. In 2015, a petition was launched to build a replica of the arch. The Dundee City Council has stated that they "could never have rebuilt something like [the Royal Arch]", but granite paving slabs were put on the site of the arch, and four trees were planted nearby to commemorate the landmark.

The V&A Dundee, which opened in 2018, features an arch as part of the building design, which was inspired by the old arch.

== Depictions in local culture ==
- A cast bronze model of the arch is situated outside the east entrance to the Overgate Centre in the middle of the city.
- The arch was also used symbolically by Steven Holl Architects in their unsuccessful bid to build the annex of Victoria and Albert Museum, to be located on the banks of the River Tay.
- A famous photograph of the arch, taken by noted photojournalist Michael Peto in 1959, is held by the archive services of University of Dundee and is available to view online.
- In May 2016, a cardboard replica of the Arch was constructed in Dundee's Slessor Gardens, near the site of the original, as part of a People's Tower public art project, being taken down the next day. 1200 cardboard boxes were used to create the replica.

== Sources ==
- "Royal Arch, Dundee". Dundee City Council. 2002. Archived from the original on 27 September 2007. unknown
- "Royal Arch, Dundee Docks". Dictionary of Scottish Architects. 2006. Archived from the original on 28 September 2007.
- "Royal Arch, Dundee Docks". Gazetteer for Scotland. 2004.Frances Groome
