= RRS Discovery (2012) =

Royal Research Ship operated by the Natural Environment Research Council

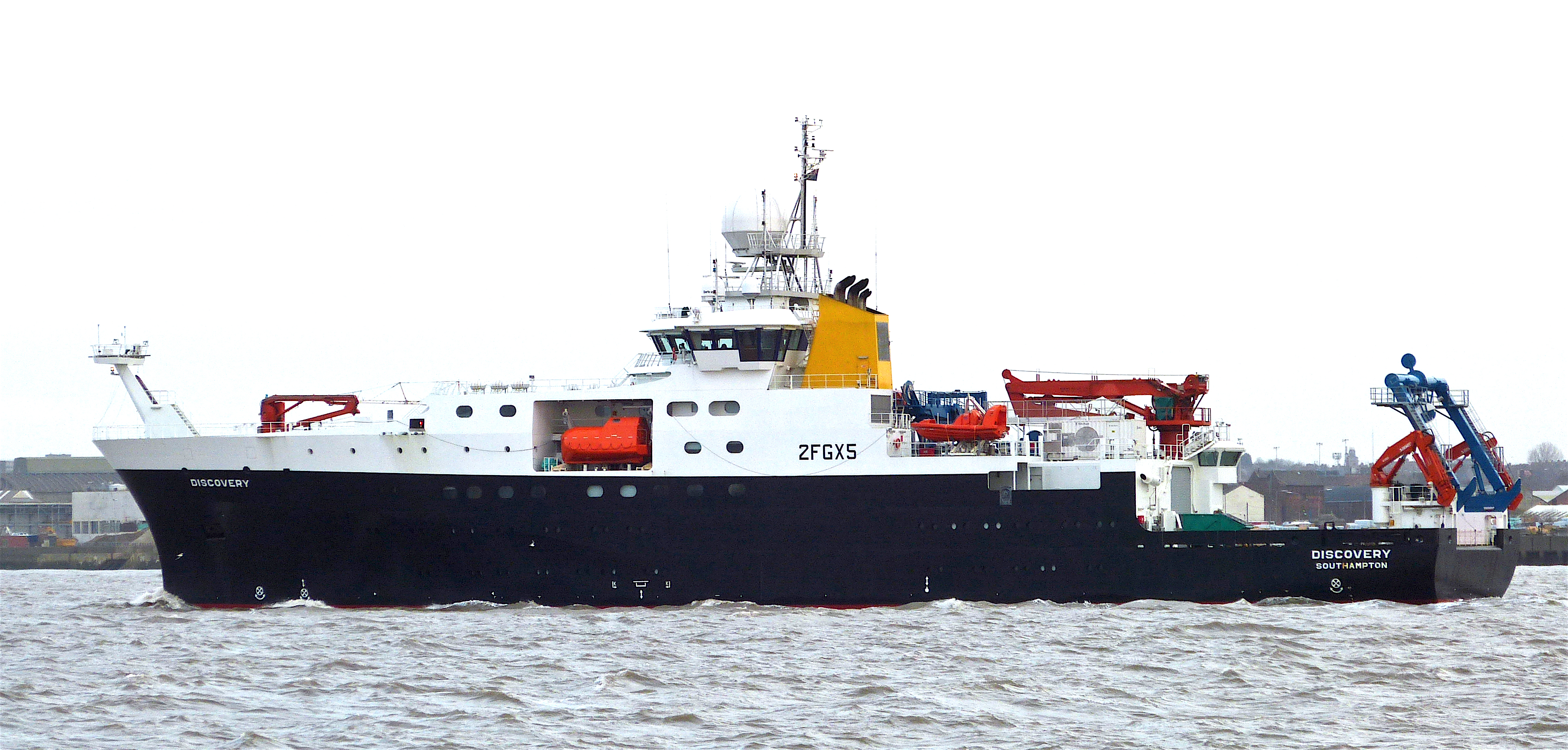

History
- Name: RRS Discovery
- Owner: NERC Research Ship Unit
- Builder: C.N.P. Freire, S.A., Spain
- Cost: £68 million
- Laid down: 16 February 2011
- Launched: 6 April 2012
- Completed: 3 June 2013
- Identification: IMO number: 9588029; MMSI number: 235091165; Callsign: 2FGX5
- Status: in service

General characteristics
- Class & type: Lloyd's +100A1, Ice 1D, LMC, UMS, DP(AM), IWS, EP, Research Vessel
- Tonnage: 5,954 GT
- Displacement: 6,260 tonnes
- Length: 99.7 m (327 ft)
- Beam: 18 m (59 ft)
- Draught: 5.1–6.6 m (17–22 ft)
- Installed power: Wärtsilä 8L20 - 4x 1,770 kW
- Propulsion: 2 × Azimuth Thrusters (5-bladed, fixed pitch); One retractable azimuth forward (1,350kW); One Tees Gill water-jet thruster (1,700 kW)
- Speed: 12 knots
- Crew: 24 marine crew; 28 scientists
- Notes: Endurance 50 days

RRS Discovery is a Royal Research Ship operated by the Natural Environment Research Council. The ship is the third such vessel to be built and named for the ship used by Robert Falcon Scott in his 1901–1904 expedition to the Antarctic.

== History ==
Discovery was built as a replacement for the previous Discovery in the "blue ocean" research role. The ship was ordered in 2010 from the C.N.P. Freire shipyard in Vigo, Spain, and was launched in April 2012. Discovery was delivered to the NERC in the summer of 2013 for a period of sea trials prior to her planned initial deployment.

In 2023 Discovery visited Scotland, where she undertook a refit in dock at the Port of Rosyth, near Edinburgh, before travelling to Dundee, where Scott's ship was built and is now permanently moored, as part of the 100th anniversary celebrations of the refit of the 1901 ship. Discovery returned to Dundee in 2025 to celebrate the 100th anniversary celebrations of the 1901 ship being designated a Royal Research Ship.

== Features ==
The ship is fitted with flexible laboratory spaces, allowing the laboratories to be tailored to the nature of the different scientific activities intended to take place on each cruise. Discovery is also fitted with an advanced hydroacoustic system in three major parts; a pair of major echosounders plus a hydrophone are installed in a special "blister" installation on the ship's keel, while she also carries a pair of "drop keels" containing more echosounders, hydrophones and CCTV cameras. Discovery is also capable of operating the National Oceanography Centre's ROUV Isis.
