= Alexander Scrymgeour (died 1306) =

Scottish knight (died 1306)

- Died: 4 August 1306

Sir Alexander Scrymgeour (died 4 August 1306) was a Scottish knight who took part in the War of Scottish Independence, as a supporter of Robert de Brus. He was constable of Dundee and Scottish standard bearer who was captured and later executed by the English in 1306.

== Life ==
Alexander was the son of Colin Scrimgeour. He was appointed constable of Dundee Castle and the standard bearer of Scotland at the Scottish parliament of 29 March 1298, held by Guardian William Wallace at Torphichen. He was with Robert the Bruce at the Battle of Methven. During the battle on 19 June 1306, Alexander was captured by English forces under Aymer de Valence, Earl of Pembroke, along with a number of Bruce's closest supporters. The Earl of Pembroke refused to summarily execute the prisoners as ordered by Edward I of England. Alexander was executed on 4 August by hanging at Newcastle-upon-Tyne. He was succeeded by his son Nicholas.
