= Dundee Synagogue =

- Location of the former synagogue in Scotland

Religion
- Affiliation: Judaism (former)
- Ecclesiastical or organizational status: Synagogue (1878–2019)
- Status: Closed (in 2019)

Location
- Location: 9 St Mary's Place, Dundee, Scotland DD1 5RB
- Country: United Kingdom
- Interactive map of Dundee Synagogue
- Coordinates: 56°27′52″N 2°59′23″W

Architecture
- Architect: Ian Imlach
- Type: Synagogue architecture
- Style: Modernist
- Established: 1878 (as a congregation)
- Completed: 1978

Dundee Synagogue is a former Jewish synagogue, located on St Mary Place, Dundee, Scotland, in the United Kingdom. From 1978 until its closure in 2019, the building was the place of worship of the Tayside and Fife Jewish Community, which was established in 1878 under its former name of the Dundee Hebrew Congregation.

== History ==
Designed by Ian Imlach, the synagogue building was opened in 1978 to replace the former synagogue building at 15 Meadow Street that was demolished in 1973.

Jews were recorded as living in Dundee in the 1840s. The community had previously met at 132 Murraygate Street and (from 1895 to 1920) at 62 Murraygate Street. The synagogue on St Mary Place was formally closed on 7 June 2019, and the base of operations for the Tayside and Fife Jewish Community moved to St Andrews.

Logo of the former Jewish community

== See also ==
- History of the Jews in Scotland
- List of former synagogues in the United Kingdom
- List of Jewish communities in the United Kingdom
- Scottish Council of Jewish Communities
