= Beano Studios =

British children's entertainment company

- Type: Subsidiary
- Industry: Television, publishing
- Genre: Children's fiction
- Founded: 8 June 2016; 10 years ago in London, United Kingdom
- Area served: Worldwide
- Key people: Michael Stirling (CEO, Dundee); David Guppy (CEO, London)
- Brands: Beano magazine
- Parent: DC Thomson
- Divisions: Emanata Studios
- Website: www.beanostudios.com

Beano Studios is a British content production company specializing in children’s entertainment and media based in Dundee, Scotland and London, England. A subsidiary of DC Thomson & Co. Ltd, it was launched in 2016 to expand The Beano franchise.

== History ==
=== Establishment and first productions ===
DC Thomson launched Beano Studios in June 2016. The launch included a revamp of the Beano comic's cover and logo, and the launch of the beano.com website. Nigel Pickard joined as non-executive director and Emma Scott served as CEO until 2020, when she was succeeded by David Guppy.

The Beano.com website includes games, videos, articles, and news about celebrities. According to Mike Stirling, then Head of Beano Studios Scotland, the website aimed to be "a fun but trusted babysitter". The website gained over two million visitors per year and is credited with increasing comic sales by 10% in 2018.

=== 2017–2021: Dennis and Gnasher: Unleashed! and wider expansion ===
Beano Studios produced the 3D-animated series Dennis & Gnasher: Unleashed! for CBBC, which premiered in November 2017. The series was distributed internationally by Jetpack and was sold to over 90 territories. It received an Emmy nomination in 2019.

Other projects included a live-action Minnie the Minx series titled The Magnificent Misadventures of Minnie announced in 2018 and a Bananaman cartoon announced by Fox Entertainment in 2021.

== Productions ==
=== Television ===
Year	Title	Studio	Distributor	Original network	Ref
2017–2021	Dennis and Gnasher: Unleashed!	Beano Studios	BBC; Netflix (international)	CBBC; Netflix	

=== Short films ===
Year	Title	Studio	Distributor	Original network	Ref
2023	Calamity James	Emanata Studios	BBC	BBC Three; BBC iPlayer	

== Awards and nominations ==
Year	Award	Category	Production	Studio	Result	Ref
2018	British Animation Awards	Best Children's Series	Dennis and Gnasher: Unleashed!	Beano Studios	Nominated	
2018	International Emmy Kids Awards	Animation	Dennis and Gnasher: Unleashed!	Beano Studios	Nominated	
2019	Writers Guild Awards	Best Children’s TV Episode	Dennis and Gnasher: Unleashed!	Beano Studios	Won	
2019	Kidscreen Awards	Best Animated Series	Dennis and Gnasher: Unleashed!	Beano Studios	Won	
2024	RTS Scotland Award	Comedy	Calamity James	Emanata Studios	Nominated	
2024	Broadcast Digital Awards	Best Short-Form Scripted	Calamity James	Emanata Studios	Nominated	

== Sources ==
- Anderson, John, ed. (2018). Beano: 80 Years of Fun. Fleet Street, London: DC Thomson. ISBN 9781845357023.
