= Michael Peto =

Michael Peto (also known as Mihály Petö) (1908 – 25 December 1970) was an internationally recognized Hungarian-British photojournalist of the twentieth century. Emigrating to London before World War II through business, in the postwar years he became one of a generation of Hungarian artists working abroad. During the war, he worked for the British Ministry of Labour. With exiled Hungarians, he also worked to found a postwar socialist government in Hungary, but they were defeated by the Soviet Union.

In the early postwar years, he studied photography in Paris with fellow Hungarian émigré Ervin Marton, already a recognized artist. Returning to London, Peto established his career as a photojournalist, covering the 1948 Summer Olympics and starting on staff of The Observer in 1949. He gained recognition in the 1950s and 1960s, capturing British cultural life, including figures ranging from ballet dancers Dame Margot Fonteyn and Rudolph Nureyev to The Beatles. He also traveled internationally and produced many photographs of people and regions around the world. Archive Services at the University of Dundee hold the Michael Peto Collection, which includes thousands of photographs, negatives, slides, publications and papers.

== Early life and education ==
He was born Mihály Petö in the small town of Bata, Austria-Hungary in 1908. His father had a general store, where the young Petö began to work after completing his secondary education. With an interest in Hungarian arts and crafts, he developed his own business and exported items to western European countries.

== Career ==
In the 1930s, Petö moved to Budapest, where he continued to work in his family's export business of Hungarian craft products. Through this, he was able to reach Great Britain before World War II. During the war, he lived in London and worked for the Ministry of Labour. He strongly backed the Allied war effort. In his free time, Petö worked with other Hungarians, planning for the postwar future of their country. He worked as personal secretary to Count Mihály Károlyi, who had been president of the short-lived Hungarian Democratic Republic. As the leader of the New Democratic Hungary, he was trying to create the next postwar government. They hoped to establish a socialist Hungary after its liberation at the end of the war, but did not anticipate the postwar domination by the Soviet Union. During the war Peto also advocated the development of an international exchange school of teachers and pupils once the conflict was over. this reflected his strong interest in the education of adults and children. Peto favoured progressive education systems and was a strong supporter of A S Neill, becoming involved with his Summerhill School in 1944.

In the early post-war years, Peto became interested in photography and went to Paris, where he connected with the Hungarian arts community. He studied technique with the well-known photographer Ervin Marton, who encouraged him to continue and became his friend, as did others in the art circle. Peto soon returned to London and gained work as a photojournalist, where his friend, the artist Josef Herman, also supported his new venture.

In 1948, Peto took notable photographs of athletes in the Olympics. By 1949, Peto joined the newspaper The Observer as a photojournalist. Much of his work reflects his subsequent travels throughout Europe, the Middle East, and countries in Asia, including India. Major exhibitions have been held of his work in London, Liverpool, Dundee (where the archive collection of his prints and negatives is held) and other cities.

Peto's major interest lay in the study of the human form in its natural surroundings. He is considered by some to be one of the supreme masters of this aspect of photographic art. He photographed portraits and candid shots of many famous figures from the worlds of politics, art and entertainment. During the 1950s and 1960s, Peto photographed many figures of the London arts scenes. His photographs of the ballet partnership of Dame Margot Fonteyn and the young Russian refugee dancer Rudolf Nureyev, who joined her at the Royal Ballet, were known internationally. In 1962 he was featured in the fifth episode of the Granada Television produced schools television series. So far it is not known whether or not this episode survives.

He was commissioned in 1965 to take still photographs of The Beatles during the making of their film Help!. During the digitisation of the Michael Peto Collection, which is held by Archive Services, University of Dundee, in 2002, 500 previously unpublished photographs of the Beatles taken during the making of Help! were reported to have been uncovered. His photographs became known for their candid and expressive quality.

Peto also photographed several prominent British political figures of the 1950s and 1960s including Winston Churchill, Clement Attlee, Harold Wilson and Edward Heath. He also photographed world leaders such as Israel's P.M.Golda Meir and Soviet Union's first secretary Nikita Khrushchev. He also toured the Middle East with Save the Children.

Michael Peto died at age 62 on Christmas Day 1970. The Michael Peto Photographic Collection is now held and administered by Archive Services at the University of Dundee, Scotland, which holds the copyright.

== Legacy and honors ==
- 1960, bronze medal by the International Organisation of Journalists at Interpress-Foto, Berlin
- 1970, bronze medal at the Budapest International Exposition of Photographic Art.
- After Peto's death, his stepson Michael Fodor donated his entire works, an estimated 130,000 photographic prints and negatives, to the University of Dundee, Scotland. Fodor was a student at the University at the time. A different photograph from the collection can be viewed on the University of Dundee Archive Services website each week and archive of previous images is also available.
- 2006, Genesis Publications published Now These Days Are Gone, a collection of Peto's photographs of the Beatles. An exhibition of some of these photographs was held at Hoopers Gallery, Clerkenwell, in January 2006 to mark the book's launch.
- 2007, An exhibition of Peto's work was held at the University of Dundee as part of the University's 40th anniversary celebrations.
- 2007–2008, Now These Days Are Gone: The Beatles Photographs of Michael Peto, 18 August 2007 to 2 March 2008, National Conservation Centre, Liverpool.
- 2008, An exhibition of Peto's Beatles photographs was held at Cavan County Museum.
- 2009 An exhibition of Peto's photographs of India was at the University of Dundee and was opened by Dr Arun Gandhi.
- 2011, Peto's photographs of the Beatles were exhibited in Dundee, as part of the Scottish Beatles Weekend.
- 2011, An exhibition of Peto's work was held at the Proud Gallery, Camden.
