= 1993 Dundee Timex Strike =

1993 industrial dispute

Timex strike
- Date: 29 January – 28 August 1993
- Location: Dundee, Scotland
- Caused by: Cut in pay; Layoffs of some workers
- Goals: Prevent workers from being laid off; Demands for better pay
- Methods: Strike action; Mass picketing
- Result: Peter Hall's resignation as company president; Closure of Timex factory in Dundee after 47 years; Workers of Timex factory made unemployed

Parties
Timex Corporation	Striking workers; Amalgamated Engineering and Electrical Union; Scottish Trade Union Congress; Other protestors

Lead figures
Peter Hall; John Dryfe; Mohammed Saleh	Gavin Laird; Jimmy Airlie; Harry McLevy; Charlie Malone; John Kydd

Number
	~340 sacked striking workers; ~3,000 protesters

Casualties
- Death: None
- Injuries: Various
- Arrested: 38

The 1993 Dundee Timex strike was a major industrial dispute which took place in Dundee, Scotland, in 1993. The dispute, which was notable for its level of picket-line violence and the involvement of women, ended with the closure of the Timex plant in the city after 47 years. It is considered by historians to be the last of the large industrial disputes of late 20th century Britain.

== Background ==
The Timex Corporation established itself as a major employer in Dundee after World War II due to generous incentives by Dundee City Council, including the sale of publicly owned land to the corporation for £57,000. It set up at two campuses in the city: one at Milton and another at Camperdown. These two facilities were divided along gender lines and specialty. The Milton plant was 60 per cent male and predominantly produced tools and components. Camperdown however was 80 per cent female and did the assembly work.

In 1966, Timex was the third largest single employer in Dundee, and the single largest employer of women. It peaked at 6,000 total workers in 1974, which made it one of the city's largest employers and gave it a unique place in the culture of Dundee. In 1982, the Camperdown factory manufactured a record number of watches, totaling 2.5 million units.

Dundee's other large employer of women in the mid to late 20th century was the jute industry. However, Timex's assembly line paid significantly better, making it a more attractive option for many young women. Additionally, as jute manufacturing contracted in the city in the 1950s and 1960s, Timex absorbed much of the skilled workforce. These jobs offered better pay and conditions (for the men they doubled their earnings).

=== 1983 Strike and Milton Closure ===
With the introduction of the digital watch, demand for mechanical watches like the ones produced at Timex in Dundee collapsed. Timex management took the decision to diversify their manufacturing in Dundee, beginning in the early 1970s with contracts to produce Polaroid and Nimslo 3-D cameras. These contracts primarily relied on the female assembly worker who could pivot easily from assembling delicate mechanical components to delicate electronic components. Initially, the mostly male workers at Milton were in support of the new shift towards electronics as it was done in consultation with the Amalgamated Engineering Union (AEU). The manufacture of the Nimslo 3-D was developed using public–private partnership money and the skills of the union engineers at Timex Dundee. By 1982, the workforce had reduced to 4,200, mostly through normal wastage and staff turnover.

However, in 1981 or 1982 a new director of manufacturing who had previously managed electronics factories in Pinochet's Chile, changed the relationship between the unionised workforce and management.

The mostly male workers at the Milton plant became superfluous to this type of manufacture in Dundee as they produced watch components to be assembled at Camperdown.

The facility had enjoyed a temporary reprieve in the early part of the decade due to Timex's contract with Sinclair Research to manufacture its personal computer products (principally the ZX81 and ZX Spectrum), which sold in huge numbers. However, Sinclair's computer business was bought out in 1986 by Amstrad, who ended the lucrative contract, and once again the factory fell upon bad times. This ultimately led to attempts to reduce wages and cut the size of the workforce. These attempts were resisted by the workers and their trade union.

== Sequence of events ==
=== Lay-offs ===
On Christmas Eve 1992, Timex workers were informed by company management of plans to temporarily lay-off 150 employees, around half the workforce at the time, due to poor business performance. The Amalgamated Engineering and Electrical Union (AEEU), acknowledged the business case for making lay-offs, but argued that the impact could be spread more equitably amongst the workforce. The AEEU suggested that the lay-offs should be distributed in such a way that affected workers could work a rota of alternating weeks so that no worker lost all of their income, whilst also reducing labour costs for the business. Timex management, led by Peter Hall, rejected these proposals and refused to negotiate. Some shop stewards from the AEEU alleged that the lay-offs were targeted towards workers who were affiliated with the AEEU.

=== Strike action ===
On the recommendation of the shop stewards, a vote for strike action by a raise of hands, was held in the staff canteen resulting in 92% of votes cast in favour. On 29 January the strike began, lasting 3 weeks. Timex immediately went to the Court of Session and had an interdict issued to the AEEU picketers forbidding anymore than 6 striking workers on the picket line, however AEEU organisers subverted this interdict by calling daily "mass meetings" outside the factory.

On 5 February, Timex issued letters to all striking employees informing them of changes to the terms and conditions the company was prepared to offer employees and stated that unless they contacted the company to accept these terms and return to work their employment would be terminated. These changes agreed to earlier AEEU proposals for an alternating rota of lay-offs but now included a 10% pay cut, cuts to pension contributions and savings schemes, reduced canteen subsidies and changes to working patterns.

==== Factory lock-out ====
On the 17 February, striking employees offered to return to work with the hopes of re-commencing negotiations with company management, however as the striking workers and the AEEU had refused to accept the terms of the letter, the company decided to sack them. When the workers showed up to commence their shift they discovered they had been locked out of the factory. Officers from Tayside Police were stationed outside the factory gates and refused to let the workers who had gone on strike into the workplace. When police officers forcibly pushed the sacked workers away from the factory gates many resisted leading to the first of a series of violent confrontations between those on the picket line and the police force.

==== Use of strikebreakers ====
Replacement workers were brought in daily on Moffat and Williamson buses to break the picket line and replace the striking workers which was a major cause of anger and led to several confrontations between sacked workers and strikebreakers protected by police officers. Picketers tried to stop the buses making their way up the hill, known locally as "Timex Brae", by lying across the road or clinging on to the buses themselves, but were forcibly removed by police officers. These replacement workers were often recruited from the unemployed population at job centres and adverts in local newspapers and were paid less than the sacked workers they replaced. Strikebreakers tried to hide their identity from the picketers and media by covering their faces, and received threats of violence, verbal abuse and were pejoratively referred to as "scabs". Those who were identified were subject to intimidation, vandalism, and social ostracisation, in some cases this continued for decades after the dispute.

On the 31 March, senior Timex executives, John Dryfe and Mohammed Saleh, visited the Camperdown factory to assess the ability of replacement workers to keep up with production quotas. The day before, they had attended a private meeting in a London hotel with Peter Hall, the Lord Provost of Dundee, the convenor of Tayside Regional Council, and the Labour MP for Dundee West. Fred Olsen, the Norwegian business owner did not attend. Although none of the attendees would say what was discussed during the meeting, there is speculation that they considered softening their anti-union stance after initially attempting to bring practices in-line with Timex's labour relations policy in the United States. Despite these speculations, no attempt to end the practice of strikebreaking was ever adopted by the corporation.

==== Support for the strike grows ====
Support for the strike grew throughout Dundee and across Scotland and the United Kingdom, with organisations like the Timex Support Group was established to provide financial, moral and organisational support to the sacked workers. They were responsible for raising funds through donations to support those who had lost their income because of the dispute.

Sacked Timex workers spoke at May Day marches and rallies across Scotland that year to raise awareness and funds for striking sacked workers.

=== Peter Hall resigns ===
In June 1993, John Dryfe, US-based president of the parent company, the Timex Group, announced that Timex president, Peter Hall, had resigned. The resignation was initially met with celebration from the striking workers as it was one of their key demands to ending their dispute. Despite this, the AEEU said they were not confident that Hall's resignation would secure the future of the factory or its Dundee workforce. Hall maintained that he made the decision to resign, but there was widespread speculation that he was pushed from his role by senior management and possibly used as a scapegoat for company mismanagement, although Hall refused to comment on this.

=== Factory closure ===
On the evening of the 14 June 1993 AEEU negotiators revealed that they believed Timex were committed to closing the Camperdown factory by Christmas 1993. This was later confirmed by Timex vice-president Mohammed Saleh shortly after a "final offer" was rejected by AEEU negotiators, who said the company's proposals would mean a 27% pay cut and a two-year wage freeze without a guarantee for a secure future for the factory. The Scottish Trade Union Congress, Scottish National Party (SNP) and Labour Party criticised the company's inflexibility in negotiations. On the 13 July an early day motion was submitted to the House of Commons with the support of 55 Labour MPs and one SNP MP which condemned the Timex Corporation and supported a worldwide boycott of its products.

After removing all contents from the factory sooner than expected, the factory shut at 6pm on 28 August 1993 following six months of industrial unrest. Timex offered to bring in the Advisory, Conciliation and Arbitration Service (Acas) to discuss the possibility of compensation for sacked employees. The General Secretary of the AEEU described the factory closure as: "a great tragedy for Dundee and for Scotland, and indeed for the UK".

== Legacy ==
In 1971, 42 per cent of people in employment in Dundee were employed in manufacturing. By 2001, that number was 15.2 per cent. The manufacturing sector in Dundee never recovered from the loss of the jobs at Milton and then the jobs at Camperdown. Many people involved with the 1993 strike struggled to find work afterwards. Although the 1983 strike and subsequent job losses had a bigger impact on employment in the city, the 1993 strike is the one that has entered popular memory.

The strike has been the subject of a play and an exhibition at the University of Dundee. A collection of records relating to the strike is held by the university's Archive Services.

A multimedia project called Generation ZX(X) was organised by Abertay University to mark the 25th anniversary of the strike.

A documentary titled The Rise and Fall of Timex Dundee, directed by Andy Twaddle, aired on BBC Scotland on 15 October 2019, as part of their People Power short series.

The steep road that climbs from Camperdown Park along Faraday Street and Harrison Road to the site of the former Timex factory is still known colloquially as "Timex Brae" by many Dundonians.

It is possible to draw a through line from the presence of Timex in the city, especially its manufacture of early personal computers, to modern Dundee's video game industry, which has produced games such as Lemmings and Grand Theft Auto.
