= Royal Victoria Hospital, Dundee =

Hospital in Dundee, Scotland

- NHS Tayside
- Shown in Dundee

Geography
- Location: Dundee, Scotland.
- Coordinates: 56.4627°N 3.0141°W

Organisation
- Care system: NHS Scotland
- Type: Specialist

Services
- Speciality: Medicine for the elderly

History
- Founded: 1896

Links
- Other links: List of hospitals in Scotland

Royal Victoria Hospital, Dundee is a hospital in Dundee, Scotland. It was formerly known as the Victoria Hospital for Incurables. The hospital is primarily dedicated to medicine for the elderly and is managed by NHS Tayside.

== History ==
The hospital has its origins in a body called the Society in Aid of Incurable Persons in Dundee and District. This was set up around 1896 and raised funds to acquire Balgay House, in Dundee's Jedburgh Road. This building, thought to date from around 1760, was then extended and adapted into a hospital for Incurables which was opened on 26 August 1899. In 1900 it was renamed the Royal Victoria Hospital, after Queen Victoria, but continued to be run by the society. In 1928 a Royal Charter by King George V made the Society into a Body Corporate and Politic under the title 'The Royal Victoria Hospital, Dundee'. James Ernest Cox (1876–1950), one of the Cox family of textile barons, was at one time vice president of the hospital.

From its foundation until was transferred to the administration of the newly formed National Health Service in 1948 the Hospital principally offered long-term nursing care for about fifty terminally ill patients. Upon the creation of the National Health Service the hospital was run by the newly formed Dundee General Hospitals Board of Management. In 1959 a geriatric ward was added. In 1980 the patients of Sidlaw Hospital were transferred to Victoria on the former's closure. By the twenty-first century Royal Victoria was mainly being used as a hospital for patients over the age of 65.

== Services ==
The hospital also houses a Centre for Brain Injury Rehabilitation. The hospital grounds are home to Roxburghe House, a Palliative Care Unit which includes 24 in-patient beds. The grounds of the hospital are also the location of a Macmillan Daycare Unit.
