= Dundee Castle =

Castle in Dundee, Scotland

Location
- Location within Dundee City council area
- Coordinates: 56.4610°N 2.9680°W

Dundee Castle was a castle in Dundee, Scotland, that Robert the Bruce destroyed in 1313.

Dundee was created a royal burgh by King William the Lion in the 13th century. The castle was surrendered to the English in 1296. William Wallace laid siege to Dundee Castle in 1297, and the garrison surrendered before the Battle of Stirling Bridge. The castle was captured again by the English in 1300 and again in 1303 and 1310. King Edward I of England visited the castle in 1300 and 1303 and repaired it. Edward de Brus captured and destroyed the castle held by Constable William de Montfichet in 1312/13 but later restored.

St. Paul's Cathedral was later (1853–1865) built on its site.

For the Constables of Dundee castle, an hereditary office after 1324, see Earl of Dundee.
