= James Chalmers (inventor) =

Scottish inventor (1782–1853)

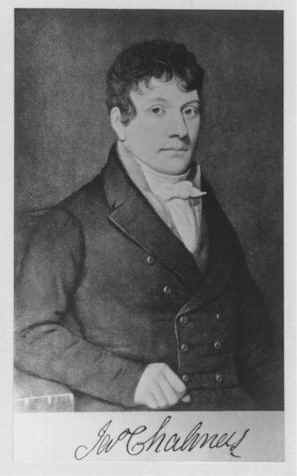
- Born: 2 February 1782; Arbroath, Angus, Scotland
- Died: 26 August 1853 (aged 71); Dundee, Scotland
- Burial place: 526 Dundee Howff
- Occupation: Inventor

James Chalmers (2 February 1782 – 26 August 1853) was a Scottish inventor (buried on 1 September 1853) who it was claimed, by his son, was the inventor of the adhesive postage stamps. (Note: James Chalmers put forward this idea in December 1837. However, Sir Rowland Hill is more commonly stated to have invented the idea of adhesive postage stamps, having put it forward at the time of his evidence before the Commissioners appointed to inquire into the Management of the Post-Office Department on 13 February 1837.)

== History ==
Chalmers trained as a weaver, before he moved to Dundee in 1809 on the recommendation of his brother. He established himself as a bookseller, printer and newspaper publisher on Castle Street. He is known to have been the publisher of "The Caledonian" as early as 1822. Later he served as a Burgh Councillor and became Convener of the Nine Incorporated Trades.

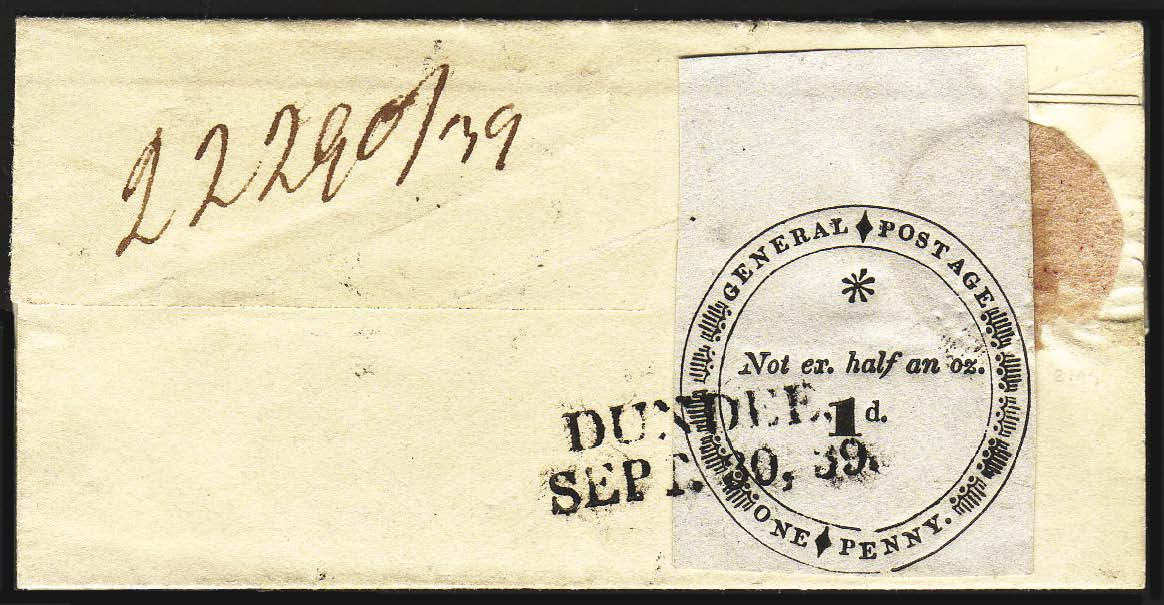
Essay submitted by James Chalmers on 30 September 1839

His most burning enthusiasm, however, was postal reform, and from 1825 he campaigned the authorities to speed up the mail between Edinburgh and London by convincing them that this was possible and could be done without extra cost. After several years he managed to induce a time saving of nearly a day in each direction.

In December 1837, he sent a letter outlining his proposals to Robert Wallace, MP for Greenock. Furthermore, he submitted an essay for a proposal for an adhesive postage stamp and cancelling device which was dated 8 February 1838. This also contained illustrations of one penny and two-pence values. He did not favour the use of an envelope for a letter, as each additional sheet incurred an additional charge. Instead, he proposed that a "slip" or postage stamp could seal a letter.

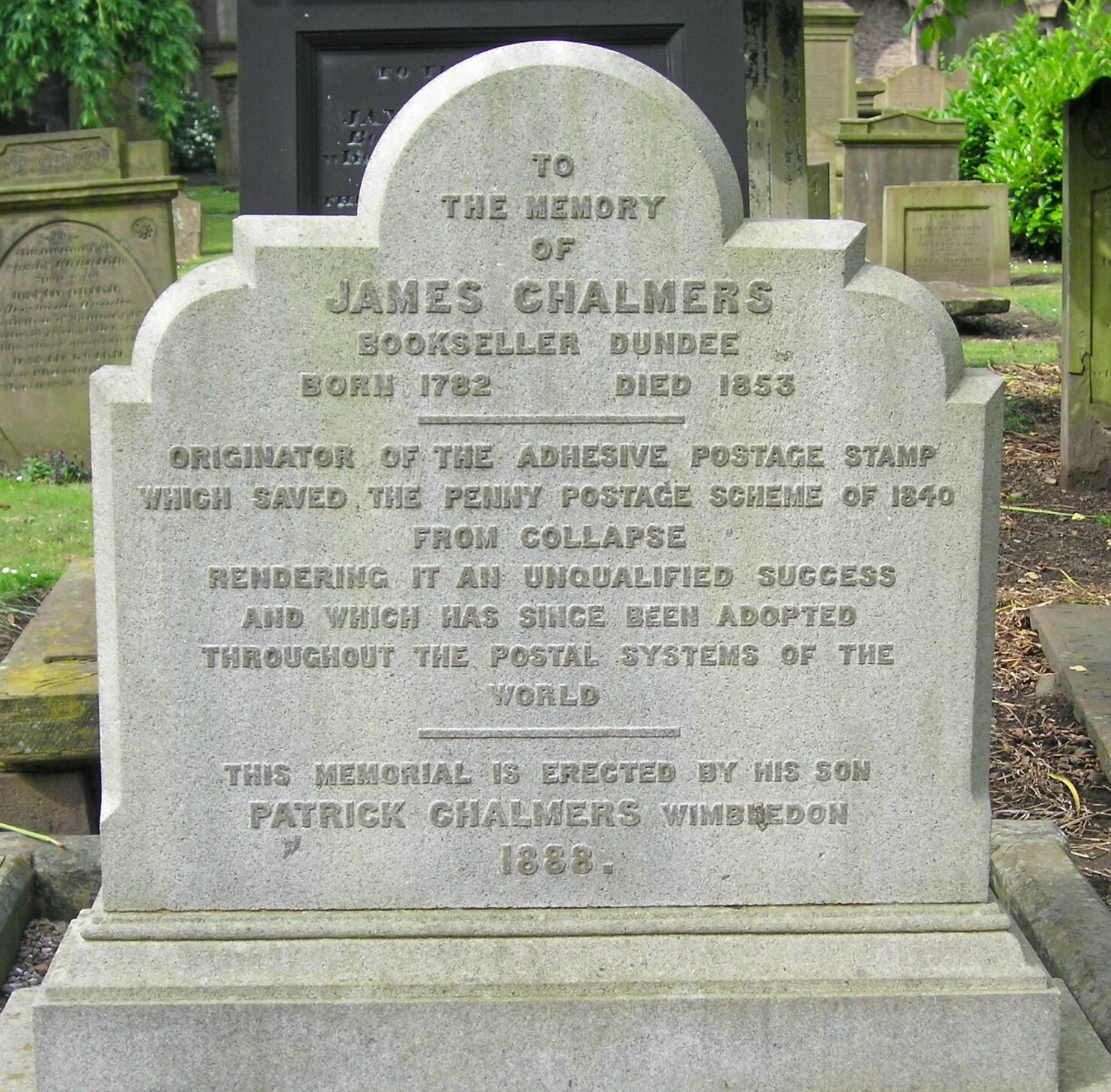
James Chalmers's tombstone

His son, Patrick Chalmers (born Dundee, 26 July 1819 – died Wimbledon, Surrey, 3 October 1891), wrote many articles that attempted to evince his father's share in the work of postal reform and as inventor of the adhesive postage stamp. His book Robert Wallace MP and James Chalmers, the Scottish Postal Reformers was published in 1890. Patrick Chalmers's daughter, Leah Chalmers, wrote a book How the adhesive postage stamp was born which was published in 1939. In 1971 a further book was published about James Chalmers "James Chalmers Inventor of the adhesive postage stamp". The co-author, William J Smith, was a director of David Winter & Sons Ltd (successor to the James Chalmers printing company). Charles Chalmers had succeeded his father James in the printing business in 1853. Charles took David Winter into partnership in 1868 and left him the business on his death in 1872. The printing company was renamed to David Winter & Son. All these books claim that James Chalmers first produced an essay for a stamp in August 1834 but no evidence for this is provided in any of the books.

== References and sources ==
=== Sources ===
- Patrick Chalmers, Robert Wallace MP and James Chalmers, the Scottish Postal Reformers, published by Effingham Wilson & Co, 1890
- Leah Chalmers, How the adhesive postage stamp was born, London, P S King & Son Ltd, 1939, 33pp
- William J Smith & J E Metcalfe, James Chalmers Inventor of the adhesive postage stamp, David Winter & Son Ltd, 1971, 148pp
- James Chalmers: Biography on Undiscovered Scotland
- The claim for James Chalmers
