= Thomas John MacLagan =

Scottish doctor and pharmacologist

- Born: 1838; Scone, Perthshire
- Died: 20 March 1903 (aged 64–65); London
- Education: University of Edinburgh
- Occupation: Doctor
- Known for: Pioneering clinical use of thermometers; Use of salicin

Thomas John MacLagan (1838 – 20 March 1903) was a Scottish medical doctor and pharmacologist from Perthshire who pioneered the clinical use of thermometers and the use of salicin as an anti-inflammatory and treatment for rheumatism.

== Personal life ==
MacLagan was born in Scone, Perthshire in 1838. He married Isabella Scudamore, from Kent, in 1869. Between the years of 1870 and 1880 they had four children, three sons and a daughter.

== Education ==
He attended Glasgow University at the age of 15, to study humanities before going on to study medicine at the University of Edinburgh. He graduated from there with an MD in 1860, entitled 'On Oxaluria'. He then spent two years in Europe, visiting medical schools in Paris, Vienna and Munich, where he learned French and German.

== Medical career ==
On his return to Britain MacLagan spent a brief period as resident medical officer at a dispensary in Jersey before returning to Scotland to take up a post in Dundee. He was medical superintendent at Dundee Royal Infirmary from 1864 to 1866, during which time he had to cope with several major fever epidemics of typhus, typhoid, cholera and smallpox and became noted for pioneering the clinical use of thermometers.

He carried out research into the effect of salicin, an extract from willow bark and a known anti-rheumatic treatment. This work was followed by Carl Thiersch, and in 1874 salicylic acid was synthesised, the active ingredient in Aspirin.

He later established a practice in London, having been encouraged to move there by former patients the Earl and Countess of Southesk, and treated patients such as Thomas Carlyle and the royal family. At the time of his death in 1903, it was said that he "deserves a niche in the Temple of Fame as one of the great benefactors of the human race."

Maclagan's original microscope is in the collection of the Tayside Medical History Museum.

== Death ==
MacLagan died in London on 20 March 1903 of stomach cancer at the age of 65.
