= Baxter (name) =

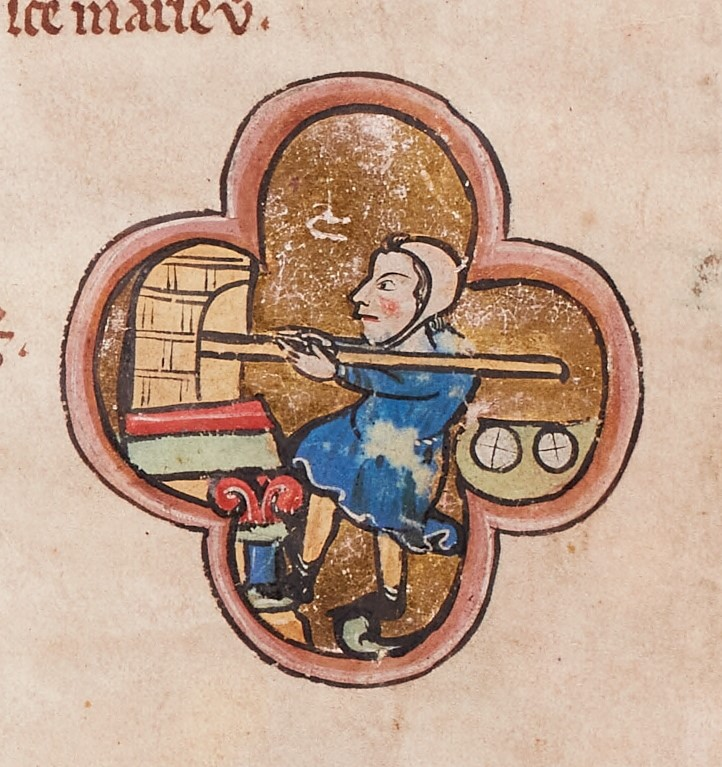
- Baker baking bread in an oven—miniature in a 13th-century psalter
- Pronunciation: /ˈbækstər/
- Gender: Male
- Language: English

Origin
- Language: Old English
- Origin: From the early Middle English bakstere and the Old English bæcere
- Meaning: "A baker"
- Region of origin: England

Other names
- Variant forms: Bakster; Baxstar; Baxstair; Baxstare; Baxster
- Related names: Baker

Baxter is a British surname, originally an occupational surname meaning baker. It derives from the early Middle English word bakstere and the Old English term bæcere. The form Bakster was initially feminine, while Baker served as the masculine equivalent, but over time, both forms came to be applied to both genders. Historical variations in the spelling of the surname include Bakster, Baxstar, Baxstair, Baxstare, and Baxster.

== People with the surname ==
=== A ===
- Al Baxter, Australian rugby union player
- Alain Baxter, Scottish skier
- Alan Baxter (disambiguation), several people
- Alexander Baxter, Scottish-Australian politician
- Alexander G. Baxter (1859–1934), New York state senator
- Alfred Baxter (disambiguation), several people
- Amy Lynn Baxter, American model and actress
- Anne Baxter, American actress
- Annie White Baxter (1864–1944), Missouri politician
- Archibald Baxter, New Zealand pacifist
- Archie E. Baxter (1844–1925), Scottish-American lawyer and politician
- Arlene Baxter, American model
- Ashleigh Baxter (born 1991), Irish rugby union player

=== B ===
- Batsell Baxter, American religious leader and educator
- Biddy Baxter, British TV producer
- Bill Baxter (disambiguation), several people
- Billy Baxter (disambiguation), several people
- Blake Baxter, American electronic musician
- Brad Baxter, American football player
- Bucky Baxter (1955–2020), American guitarist

=== C ===
- Cedric "CJ" Baxter (born 2005), American football player
- Charles Baxter (disambiguation), several people
- Colin Baxter (born 1987), American football player
- Colin Baxter (curler), Scottish curler

=== D ===
- Darren Baxter (disambiguation), several people
- David Baxter (disambiguation), several people
- Delos W. Baxter (1857–1918), American politician and lawyer
- Dorian Baxter, Canadian Anglican priest

=== E ===
- Edward Felix Baxter, British soldier
- Elisha Baxter, American jurist and politician
- Esther Baxter, American model
- Evan Buchanan Baxter (1844–1885), Russian-born Scottish physician
- E. V. Baxter (1879–1959), Scottish ornithologist

=== F ===
- Frank Baxter (disambiguation), several people
- Fred Baxter, American football player
- Fred A. Baxter (1868–1942), Wisconsin politician
- Frederick William Baxter (1858–1937), Australian showman

=== G ===
- Gary Baxter, football player
- George Baxter (disambiguation), several people
- Gillian Baxter (1938–2025), British children's book writer
- Glen Baxter (disambiguation), several people
- Gordon Baxter, American aviator
- Gregg Baxter, sound editor
- Gregory Baxter, Canadian ski jumper

=== H ===
- Headley Baxter (1919–2004), British tennis player
- Hedley Baxter (1869–1918), English politician
- Henry Baxter (1821–1873), American general

=== I ===
- Iain Baxter& (born 1936), Canadian conceptual artist
- Iain Baxter (curler) (1948–2015), Scottish curler
- Irvin Baxter Jr., American Christian apologist
- Irving Baxter, American athlete
- Ivy Baxter (1923–1993), pioneer in the field of Jamaican dance

=== J ===
- J. Clifford Baxter, Enron executive
- J.R. Baxter (1887–1960), American gospel musician
- J. Sidlow Baxter, Australian theologian
- Jacob Baxter, Canadian politician
- James Baxter (disambiguation), several people named James, Jim or Jimmy
- Jane Baxter, German-born British actress
- Jayne Baxter, Scottish politician
- Jean Rae Baxter, Canadian author
- Jeff Baxter, American guitarist and government consultant
- Joan Baxter, Canadian writer and journalist
- John Baxter (disambiguation), several people
- Jose Baxter, Former English footballer

=== K ===
- Kay Baxter, American bodybuilder
- Ken Baxter (disambiguation), several people

=== L ===
- Laurence Baxter, British statistician
- Les Baxter, American pianist
- Lois Baxter, British actress
- Lonny Baxter, American basketball player
- Luther Loren Baxter (1832–1915), American politician, lawyer, and judge
- Lydia Baxter (1809–1874), American poet
- Lynsey Baxter, British actress

=== M ===
- Marion Babcock Baxter (1850–1910), American lecturer, author, financial agent
- Marvin R. Baxter, American judge
- Mary Ann Baxter (1801–1884), Scottish philanthropist
- Matthew Baxter, paranormal investigator, skeptic
- Meredith Baxter (born 1947), American actress

=== N ===
- Nathan D. Baxter, bishop of the Episcopal Diocese of Central Pennsylvania
- Nick Baxter (disambiguation), several people
- Noel Baxter (born 1981), Scottish skier

=== P ===
- Paul Baxter, Canadian ice hockey player and assistant coach
- Percival P. Baxter, governor of the U.S. state of Maine
- Peter Baxter (disambiguation), several people

=== R ===
- Raymond Baxter, British television personality
- Richard Baxter (disambiguation), several people
- Rick Baxter, American politician
- Rob Baxter, British rugby player
- Robert Dudley Baxter, British economist
- Rodney Baxter, Australian physicist
- Rowan Baxter, former NRL player, perpetrator of Murder of Hannah Clarke

=== S ===
- Skippy Baxter (1919–2012), American figure skater
- Stanley Baxter, Scottish comedian
- Stephen Baxter (disambiguation), several people called Stephen or Steve
- Stuart Baxter, British football manager

=== T ===
- Tasha Baxter, South African singer-songwriter
- Thelma Farr Baxter (1912–1996), American politician and schoolteacher
- Thomas Baxter (disambiguation), several people called Tom, Thomas or Tommy
- Tony Baxter, American Disney Imagineer
- Trevor Baxter, British actor
- Troy Baxter Jr., American basketball player

=== V ===
- Virginia Baxter, American figure skater

=== W ===
- Walter Baxter, English novelist
- Warner Baxter, American actor
- William Baxter (disambiguation), several people
- Wynne Edwin Baxter, English lawyer and coroner

== People with the given name ==
- Baxter Atkinson, American union leader and schoolteacher
- Baxter Black (1945–2022), American cowboy, poet, philosopher, former large-animal veterinarian, and radio commentator
- Baxter Bowman (1814–1853), Canadian businessman and politician
- Baxter Dickinson (1795–1875), American minister
- Baxter Dury, pop singer, son of Ian Dury
- Baxter Ennis, American politician
- Baxter Hall (1757–1842), American military officer
- Baxter Holt (born 1999), Australian cricketer
- Baxter Humby (born 1972), Canadian kickboxer and stuntman
- Baxter Hunt, American diplomat
- Baxter Jordan (1907–1993), American baseball player
- Baxter Langley (1819–1892), British political activist and newspaper editor
- Baxter Morgan (1918–1986), Canadian accountant and politician
- Baxter E. Perry (1826–1906), American attorney and politician
- Baxter Price (born 1938), American racing driver
- Baxter T. Smelzer (1852–1932), American physician and politician
- Baxter B. Stiles (1824–1889), American politician
- Baxter Troutman (born 1966), American politician
- Baxter Ward (1919–2002), American politician

== Fictional characters with the name ==
- Baxter, Ron Burgundy's dog in the film Anchorman: The Legend of Ron Burgundy
- Dash Baxter, character from Danny Phantom
- Baxter (mascot), the mascot for the Arizona Diamondbacks baseball team
- Baxter Basics, character from British comic Viz
- Baxter Stockman, in the Teenage Mutant Ninja Turtles series
- Dr Godwin Baxter and Bella Baxter, in Poor Things
- Bella Gloria Baxter, Jeffery Baxter, Charlotte Baxter, George Baxter and Alice Baxter, in Miss BG
- President Baxter Harris, a character in the 2006 American parody Scary Movie 4
- Bruce Baxter, lead character in Peter Jackson's King Kong (2005 film)
- Buster Baxter, character from American children's Arthur (TV series)
- C. C. Baxter (Calvin Cliff), played by Jack Lemmon in The Apartment, 1960 film
- Chris Baxter, a police chief in the 2002 flash animated series Joe Zombie
- Corrine Baxter, in Strange Days at Blake Holsey High
- Cory Baxter, in That's So Raven and Cory in the House
- Denton Baxter, Irish landowner in Open Range (2003 film) played by Michael Gambon
- Evan Baxter, played by Steve Carell in Evan Almighty (2007 film)
- Georgette Franklin Baxter, in The Mary Tyler Moore Show
- Mike Baxter, played by Tim Allen in Last Man Standing (U.S. TV series)
- Phyllis Baxter, lady's maid to the Countess of Grantham in Downton Abbey
- Raven Baxter, in That's So Raven and Raven's Home
- Robert Baxter, in Time Crisis II
- Roger Baxter, Lauren "Betty" Baxter and Blythe Baxter in Littlest Pet Shop (2012 TV series)
- Rupert Baxter, Lord Emsworth's secretary in the stories of P. G. Wodehouse
- Tanya Baxter, in That's So Raven
- Ted Baxter, in The Mary Tyler Moore Show
- The Baxter Family, in Your Honor (American TV Series)
- Victor Baxter, in That's So Raven, Cory in the House and Raven's Home
- Mr. Baxter, in The Adventures of Tintin
- C.O. Baxter Bayley in Orange Is the New Black
- Baxter, a character from animated adult musical series Hazbin Hotel
- Baxter Martin, in "The Lottery" by Shirley Jackson.

== See also ==
- Baxter baronets, two Baronetcies in the Baronetage of the United Kingdom
- H. P. Baxxter, stage name of musician Hans Peter Geerdes
