= George Baxter =

George Baxter may refer to:

- George Baxter (printer) (1804–1867), English artist and printer based in London
- George Baxter (cricketer) (fl. 1792–1830), English cricketer
- George A. Baxter (1771–1841), American educator and college president
- George W. Baxter (1855–1929), American politician and territorial governor of Wyoming
- Sir George Baxter, 1st Baronet (1853–1926) of the Baxter baronets
- George Robert Wythen Baxter (1815–1854), Welsh writer
- George Baxter (actor) (1905–1976), French-American actor in films such as Thirty-Day Princess
- George Baxter, one of the main characters of the television series Hazel

== See also ==
- Baxter (name)
