= John Baxter =

John Baxter may refer to:

== Arts and entertainment ==
- John Baxter (architect) (died 1798), Scottish architect
- John Baxter (publisher) (1781–1858), English printer and publisher
- John Baxter (director) (1896–1975), British filmmaker, 1930s–1950s
- John Baxter (author) (born 1939), Australian-born writer, journalist, and filmmaker
- John Baxter (artist) (1952–2026), New Zealand artist
- John Baxter, pen name of intelligence officer E. Howard Hunt

== Politics and law ==
- John Baxter (MP for Stafford), Member of Parliament (MP) for Stafford. c. 1393–1396
- John Baxter (Northern Ireland politician) (1939–2020), Ulster Unionist politician and solicitor
- John Baxter (MP for Derby) (died 1611), English lawyer and politician
- John Baxter (political reformer) (fl. 1790–1817), English radical and political historian
- John Baxter (judge) (1819–1886), North Carolina legislator and jurist
- John G. Baxter (1826–1885), mayor of Louisville, Kentucky, 1870–1872
- John Babington Macaulay Baxter (1868–1946), premier of New Brunswick, Canada, 1925–1931
- John B. M. Baxter Jr. (1924–2000), politician in New Brunswick, Canada
- John Donald Baxter, politician in Ontario, Canada

== Science ==
- John Philip Baxter (1905–1989), British chemical engineer and Vice-Chancellor of the University of New South Wales, 1953–1969
- John Walter Baxter (1917–2003), British civil and structural engineer, designed the Westway
- John Baxter (engineer) (born 1951), British mechanical engineer
- John Baxter (marine biologist), British marine biologist

== Sports ==
- John Baxter (cricketer) (1800–?), English cricketer of the 1830s
- John Baxter (footballer) (1936–2014), Scottish association football player
- John Baxter (rugby league) (c. 1881–1927), rugby league footballer of the 1900s for Great Britain, England, and Rochdale Hornets
- John Baxter (American football) (born 1963), American football coach

== Others ==
- John Baxter (explorer) (1799–1841), friend of Edward John Eyre during crossing of Nullarbor Plain, 1840–41
- J. Clifford Baxter (1958–2002), Enron Corporation executive

== See also ==
- Jack Baxter
