= Enoch Train (disambiguation) =

Enoch Train (1801–1868) was an American shipowner and merchant.

Enoch Train may also refer to:

== Vessels ==
- CSS Manassas, originally named Enoch Train, an 1855 twin-screw towboat
- SS Enoch Train, a Liberty ship built in 1943 and scrapped in 1966

== Other uses ==
- Enoch Train (band), an American folk/world music band
