= David Baxter =

David Baxter may refer to:

- Sir David Baxter, 1st Baronet (1793–1872), Scottish linen manufacturer and philanthropist
- Dave Baxter (1910–1979), Australian rules footballer
- David Baxter (poker player), American poker player
- David S. Baxter (1955–2025), Scottish general authority of the Church of Jesus Christ of Latter-day Saints
- David Baxter (drummer), American metal drummer with Škan
- David Baxter (sprinter) (1977–2010), Australian athlete
