= American Federation of School Administrators =

American trade union

AFSA
- American Federation of School Administrators
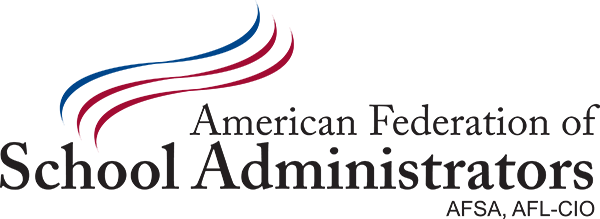
- Founded: 1976 Washington, D.C.
- Members: 18,871 (2013)
- Affiliations: AFL–CIO
- Website: afsaadmin.org

The American Federation of School Administrators (AFSA) represents public school principals, vice principals, administrators, and supervisors in the United States. The trade union is affiliated with the AFL–CIO.

The union was established by the Council of Supervisory Associations, a local union representing principals and other supervisors in the New York City Department of Education. Rather than becoming a directly affiliated local union, the AFL–CIO chartered the organization as the School Administrators and Supervisors Organizing Committee.

Because the Taft–Hartley Act does not recognize supervisors as union-eligible under federal law, AFSA only negotiates collective bargaining agreements in states where local labor rules permit them. In most areas, the organization functions as a professional association rather than a traditional union. A majority of the union's membership remains in New York City, however.

The organization publishes The School Leader and presents the Distinguished Leadership Award to highlight member achievements.

== Presidents ==
1976: Walter J. Degnan
1977: Albert L. Morrison
1980s: Peter S. O'Brien
1987: Ted Elsberg
1991: Joe L. Greene
2003: Baxter Atkinson
2006: Jill Levy
2009: Diann Woodard
2018: Ernest Logan
2022: Leonard Pugliese

== Composition ==
According to AFSA's Department of Labor records (as of 2013), about 36%, or more than a third, of the union's total membership are considered retirees, with eligibility to vote in the union. This accounts for 6,828 retirees, compared to 12,043 regular members.

Total membership (US records)
View chart definition.
Finances (US records; ×$1000)
View chart definition.

== See also ==
- American Association of School Administrators
- Association of Headteachers and Deputes in Scotland
- American Federation of Teachers
