= Jill Levy =

American former union leader and teacher

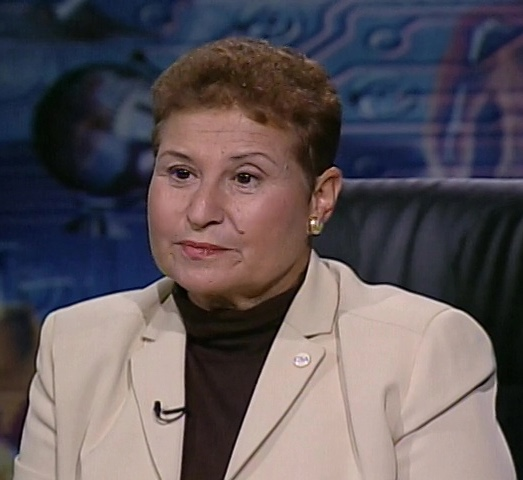
Levy on CUNY TV's Education Forum, 2000

Jill Levy is a former American union leader and schoolteacher.

Levy grew up in New York City, where she later became a schoolteacher and joined the American Federation of School Administrators (AFSA). She created a city-wide program to provide mentoring to supervisors who asked for professional help. In 2000, she was elected as president of the Council of School Supervisors and Administrators, the AFSA's largest local. In 2004 Levy, along with Retired School Supervisors Association president Irwin Shanes, worked to create a new CSA Retiree Chapter.

Levy won election as president of the AFSA in 2006. In the role she promoted the Employee Free Choice Act, and ensured the union played a leading role in the Labor 2008 campaign. She also won election as a vice-president of the AFL-CIO. She retired in 2009.

Trade union offices
Preceded by Donald Singer	President of the Council of School Supervisors and Administrators; 2000–2006	Succeeded by Ernest Logan
Preceded by Baxter Atkinson	President of the American Federation of School Administrators; 2006–2009	Succeeded by Diann Woodard
