= Nick Baxter =

Nick or Nicholas Baxter may refer to:

- Nick Baxter (rugby union), English rugby union player
- Nick Baxter (rower) (born Nicholas Baxter, 1979), Australian rower
- Nick Baxter (sport shooter) (born Nicholas James Baxter, 1971), English sport shooter
- Nicholas (Nick) Baxter, founder of Scottish charity Cornerstone

== See also ==
- Baxter (name) § N
