= Alfred Baxter =

Alfred Baxter may refer to:

- Alfred Baxter (weightlifter) (1898–1983), British Olympic weightlifter
- Alfred Baxter (winemaker) (1928–2005), American winemaker
- Alfred Baxter-Cox (1898–1958), Australian military officer and architect
