= Frank Baxter =

Frank Baxter may refer to:

- Frank William Baxter (1869–1896), Rhodesian soldier
- Frank C. Baxter (1896–1982), American educator and television personality
- Frank E. Baxter (born 1936), Republican American businessman and diplomat
