= Charles Baxter =

Charles Baxter may refer to:

- Charles Baxter (actor) (died 1998), American actor in Love and Pain and the Whole Damn Thing
- Charles Baxter (author) (born 1947), American author
- Charles Baxter (painter) (1809–1879), English painter
- Charles Baxter (politician) (1874–1950), Australian politician
- Charles Baxter (rugby union) (born 1981), New Zealand rugby union player
- Charles H. Baxter (1841–1923), American politician
- Charles R. Baxter (1929–2005), American physician
- Charles S. Baxter (1866–1927), mayor of Medford, Massachusetts
