= Ernest Logan =

Ernest A. Logan (born 1950 or 1951) is a former American labor union leader.

Born in Harlem, Logan was educated at Franklin K. Lane High School and the State University of New York at Cortland, then became a schoolteacher in Brooklyn. A few years later, he began working for the Office of Curriculum and Development, writing curricula, then in 1991 he became a school principal. He joined the American Federation of School Administrators (AFSA), and in 1993 was elected as chair of his district. In 1997, he became Director of Community School Districts for his union local, the Council of School Supervisors and Administrators. He became first vice president of the council in 2000, and president in 2006.

Logan was also elected as treasurer of the AFSA. He retired from the council in 2017, but the following year was appointed as president of the AFSA. He stood down from the AFSA in 2022, becoming president emeritus, but continues to serve as a vice-president of the AFL-CIO.

Trade union offices
Preceded by Jill Levy	President of the Council of School Supervisors and Administrators; 2006–2017	Succeeded by Mark Cannizzaro
Preceded by Diann Woodard	President of the American Federation of School Administrators; 2018–2022	Succeeded by Leonard Pugliese
