= Joe L. Greene =

American labor union leader

Joe L. Greene (born July 9, 1937) is a former American labor union leader.

Born in Mississippi, Greene became a schoolteacher in Detroit, then in 1980 became principal of a high school. In 1984, he moved to become principal of Redford High School, where he became known for strictly enforcing discipline, and introducing accelerated classes for pupils who wanted to attend them. He became president of the local Organization of School Administrators and Supervisors, and treasurer of the American Federation of School Administrators (AFSA). In 1991, he became the first African American president of AFSA.

As leader of the union, Greene moved the union's headquarters to Washington, D.C., and aimed to involve the union in debates on education policy. In 1995, he was additionally elected as a vice-president of the AFL-CIO. He retired from the union in 2003, and from the AFL-CIO in 2004.

Trade union offices
| Preceded by Ted Elsburg | President of the American Federation of School Administrators; 1991–2003 | Succeeded by Baxter Atkinson |
