= Baxter Park =

Park in Dundee, Scotland

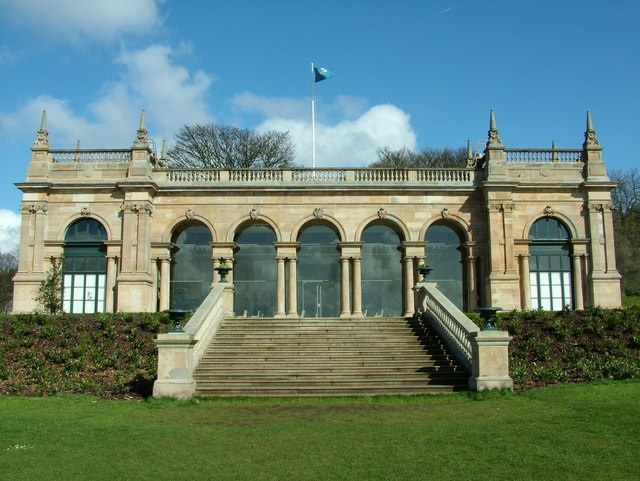
- The Pavilion in Baxter Park

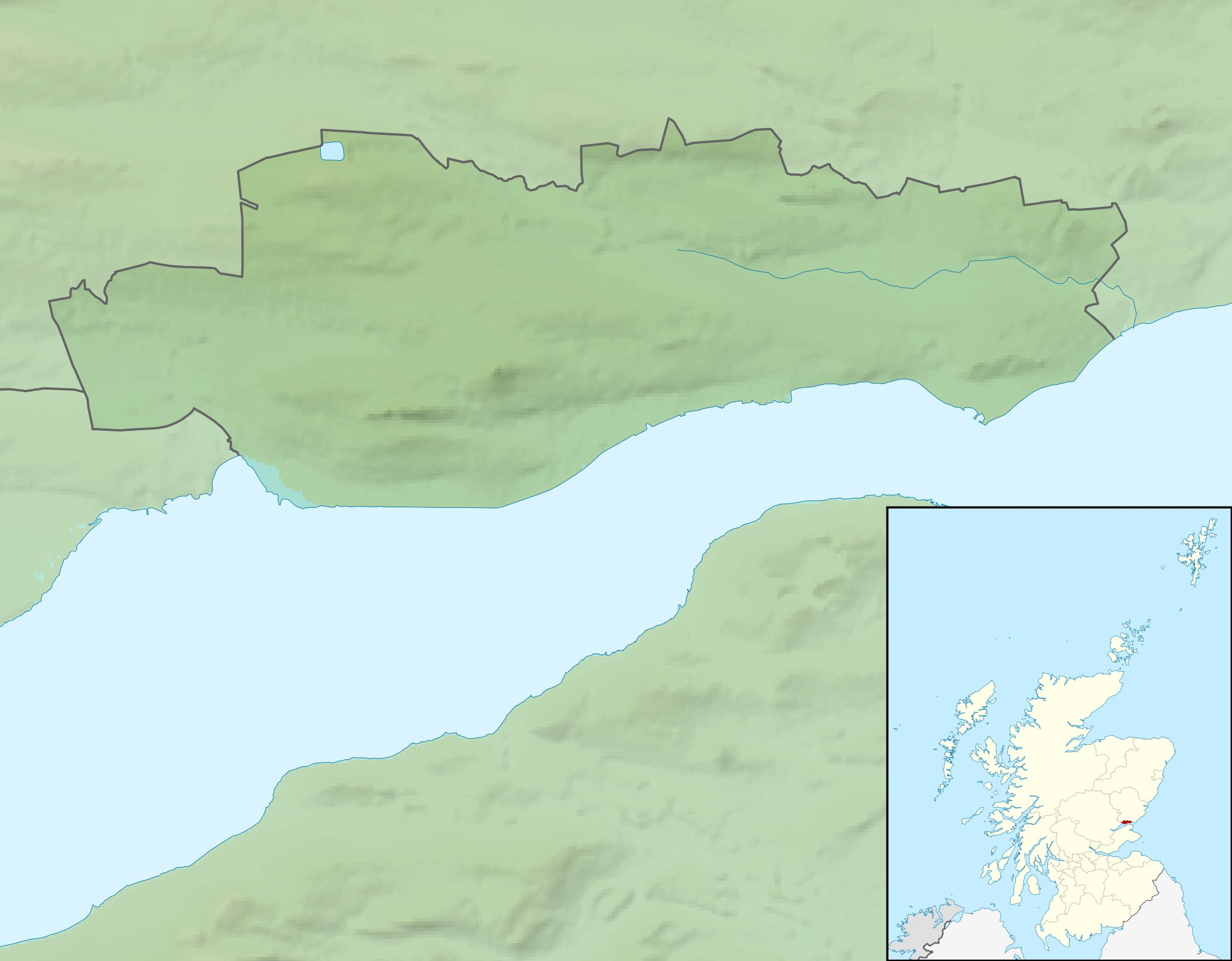
- Location within Dundee City council area
- Interactive map of Baxter Park
- Location: Dundee, Scotland
- Coordinates: 56.470670°N 2.950113°W
- Area: 37 acres (15 ha)
- Created: 1863

Inventory of Gardens and Designed Landscapes in Scotland
- Official name: Baxter Park
- Designated: 31 March 2006
- Reference no.: GDL00051

Baxter Park is a 37 acres (15 ha) park located in the east of Dundee, Scotland. It was designed between 1862-63 and is the only complete park wholly designed by Sir Joseph Paxton in Scotland. The park is included in the Inventory of Gardens and Designed Landscapes in Scotland and it features a Category A listed pavilion designed by George Henry Stokes. Baxter Park and the surrounding streets form the Baxter Park Conservation Area. The park is used as a venue for annual Bonfire Night firework displays.

== History ==
The park was donated to the citizens of the city by Sir David Baxter and his two sisters Mary Ann and Eleanor. The land was acquired in 1861, on a site that at the time was on the edge of the city, and it was laid out at a cost of £40,000, with an additional £10,000 set aside as an endowment to be managed by a board of trustees. The official opening took place on 9 September 1863 and was attended by Earl Russell and an estimated crowd of 70–80,000 people.

In 2003 the park was granted £3.25 million through the Heritage Lottery Fund and with additional funding from Historic Scotland and Dundee City Council it underwent a £5 million refurbishment. Queen Elizabeth II presided over its official reopening in July 2007. In 2009, the park was awarded Green Flag status.

== Baxter Park Pavilion ==
In the centre of the park is a two-storey Italian Renaissance style pavilion built of Bannockburn freestone. This originally housed a restaurant at one end and a gardener's room and ladies' room at the other. A marble statue of David Baxter, by John Steell and paid for by public subscription, was placed on the north side of the pavilion.

Historically, the pavilion and the statue within it have suffered vandalism. The statue was moved to the McManus Galleries in Dundee but was reinstated as part of the refurbishment of the site. The redevelopment of the pavilion, which had been derelict for many years, included the opening of a registry office and a café.
