= Jack Baxter =

Jack Baxter may refer to:

- Jack Baxter (footballer) (1889–1951), English footballer
- Jack Baxter (rugby union) (1920–2004), Australian rugby union player

== See also ==
- John Baxter
