= Enoch Train (band) =

American band

- Origin: Utah, United States
- Genres: Folk
- Years active: 1997–2011
- Labels: Joyspring Records, Excellence
- Members: Clive Romney; Rich Dixon; Daron Bradford; Tom Hewitson; Janice Andersen; Dave Compton; Rob Honey; Jay Lawrence

Enoch Train was an American folk group formed in 1997 in Salt Lake City, UT. The band's lineup comprised Clive Romney (artistic director and multi-instrumentalist), Rich Dixon (dobro, guitar, vocals), Daron Bradford (accordion, flute, shakuhachi, tin whistle, recorder, clarinet, oboe, horn (English), oboe d'amore, piano, harpsichord, vocals), Tom Hewitson (guitar, mandolin, banjo, bass, harmonica, percussion), Janice Andersen, Dave Compton (keyboard, guitar), Rob Honey (bass) and Jay Lawrence.

== Formation and ideology ==
Enoch Train was formed in 1997 after Clive Romney was challenged by Jeff Simpson, president of Excel Entertainment, to play hymns, instrumentally, in a new way.

== Sea Trek ==
From August 7 through August 28, 2001 Enoch Train anchored the musical performances of Sea Trek, including providing musical entertainment on board Statstraad Lemkuhl and headlining the "Rock the Dock" performances at each port of call. Venues included Esbjerg, Oslo, Gothenburg, Greenock, Hull, and Portsmouth. A grand finale had been planned for October 4 in New York City but while the ships were crossing from England to New York the September 11 attacks took place and the final performance was canceled.

== Awards and recognition ==
In November 2001 the Deseret News said "Enoch Train leads a list of successful local artists" giving them four out of four stars.

In their active years Enoch Train garnered eight Pearl Awards including Group of the Year in 1999 and 2002. As well as Best Instrumental Recording in 1999, for "Babylon/Paddy Clyde."

They were again recognized by the Deseret New in March 2003 for the release of their fourth album "Shall We Gather."

Utah State University hosted them for a performance in 2004 as reported in the Utah Statesman, noting that they were recipients of the Best Instrumental Group at the Best of State Awards.

== Discography ==
=== Albums ===
Title	Album details
Enoch Train	Release date: 1998; Label: Excellence
Holiday Wishes	Release date: 2000; Label: Excellence
Set Sail	Release date: 2001; Label: Joyspring Records
Shall We Gather	Release date: 2003; Label: Joyspring Records
O Come Little Children	Release date: 2006; Label: Excellence
