= Billy Baxter =

Billy Baxter may refer to:

- Billy Baxter (motorcyclist) (born c. 1963), British motorcyclist who set the blind solo world land speed record on a motorbike
- Billy Baxter (footballer) (1939–2009), Scottish footballer
- Billy Baxter (poker player) (born 1940), American poker player and sports bettor
- Billy 'Silver Dollar' Baxter (1926–2012), American film producer
- Billy Baxter (musician) (born c. 1959), Australian radio presenter and musician
  - "Billy Baxter" (song), a 1980 song by Paul Kelly & the Dots describing the musician

== See also ==
- Bill Baxter (disambiguation)
- William Baxter (disambiguation)
- Baxter (disambiguation)
