= Charles Baxter (painter) =

English painter

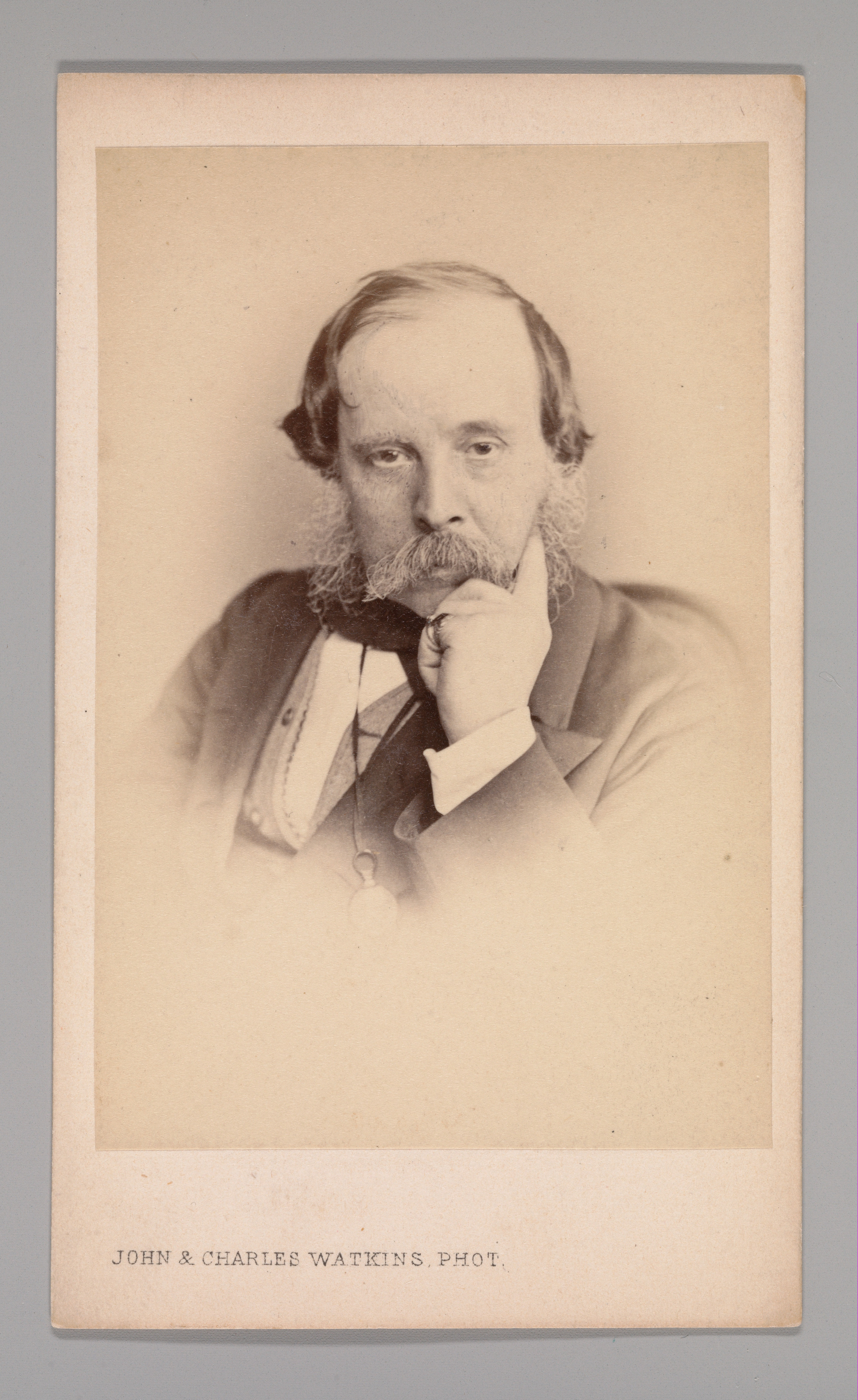
Charles Baxter in the 1860s

Charles Baxter (March 1809 – 10 January 1879) was an English portrait and subject painter, known especially for his portraits of young women.

== Life and work ==
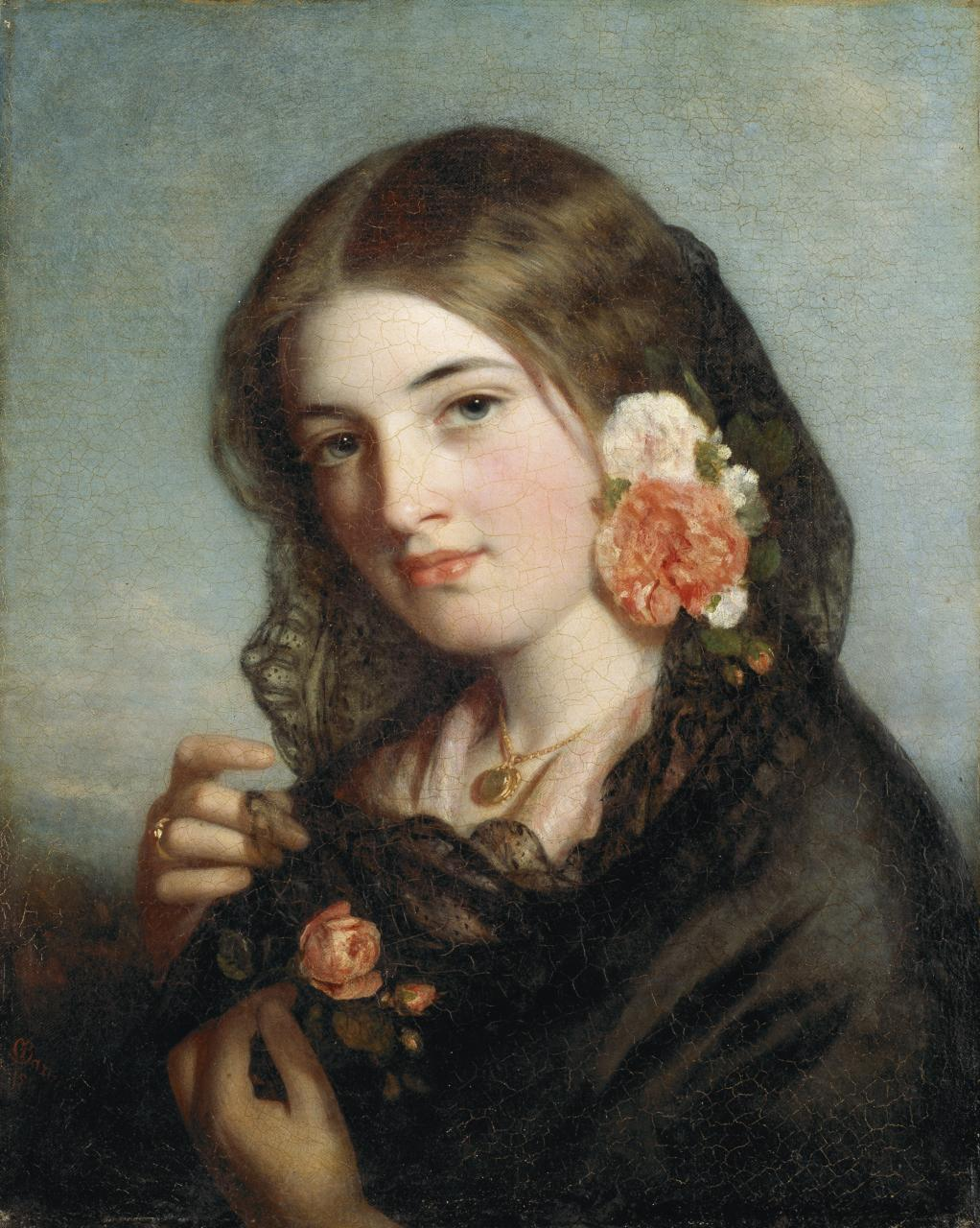
Rose of England by Charles Baxter, 1861, National Gallery of Victoria, Melbourne

Baxter was born in Little Britain, London in 1809, the son of a book clasp maker, and started his career apprenticed to a bookbinder. However, he gave up this business to commence life as a professional painter, chiefly of miniatures and portraits. In 1834 he made the acquaintance of George Clint, from whom he received some valuable instruction, and in the same year exhibited for the first time at the Royal Academy.

In 1839 he joined the Clipstone Street Society, and studied there along with Paul Falconer Poole, William Müller, Edward Duncan (1804–1882), Joseph John Jenkins (1811–1885), Francis William Topham (1808–18), and others, who afterwards became distinguished in the profession. He became a member of the Society of British Artists in 1842, and contributed to its exhibitions many of the poetic and rustic subjects and fancy portraits upon which his reputation chiefly rests. His female heads are especially characterised by refinement of expression and purity of colour.

Amongst his best works are:

- The Orphan (1843)
- The Wanderers (1847)
- L'Allegro (1852)
- Love me, love my Dog (1854)
- Sunshine (1855)
- 'The Bouquet (1855)
- The Dream of Love (1857)
- Little Red Riding Hood (1859)
- Olivia and Sophia (London Exhibition, 1862).
- The Ballad (1863)
- Peasant Girl of Chioggia (1869).
- Tranquility (1869).
- Rich and rare were the gems she wore (1872).

He died at Lewisham, London on 10 January 1879.
