= Allan Baxter =

Allan Baxter may refer to:

- Allan George Baxter, see List of British police officers killed in the line of duty
- Allan Baxter, character in Mega Shark Versus Giant Octopus, played by Lorenzo Lamas

== See also ==
- Alan Baxter (disambiguation)
