= Sea Trek 2001 =

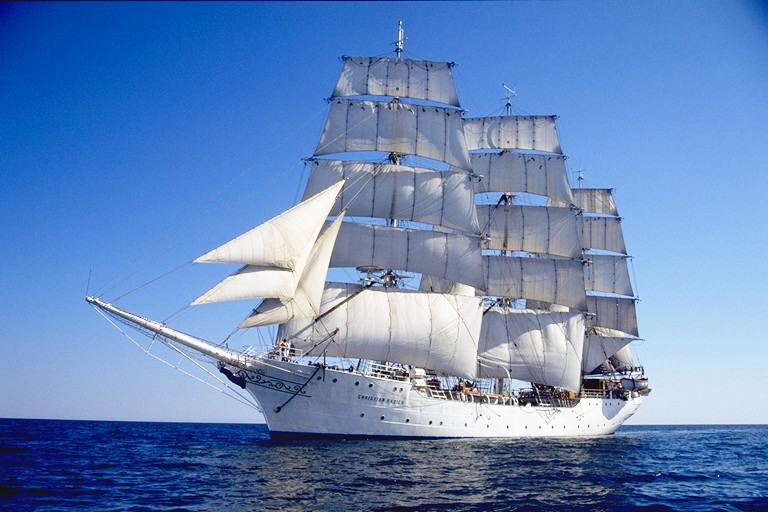
The Christian Radich, one of the tall ships chartered by Sea Trek 2001 to cross the Atlantic Ocean.

Sea Trek 2001 was a privately organized commemorative sea voyage in 2001, celebrating the 150th anniversary of the migration of members of the Church of Jesus Christ of Latter-day Saints (LDS Church) from Europe to the United States during the 19th century. It followed the church's sesquicentennial reenactments of Mormon pioneer wagon trains of 1997.

== Events ==
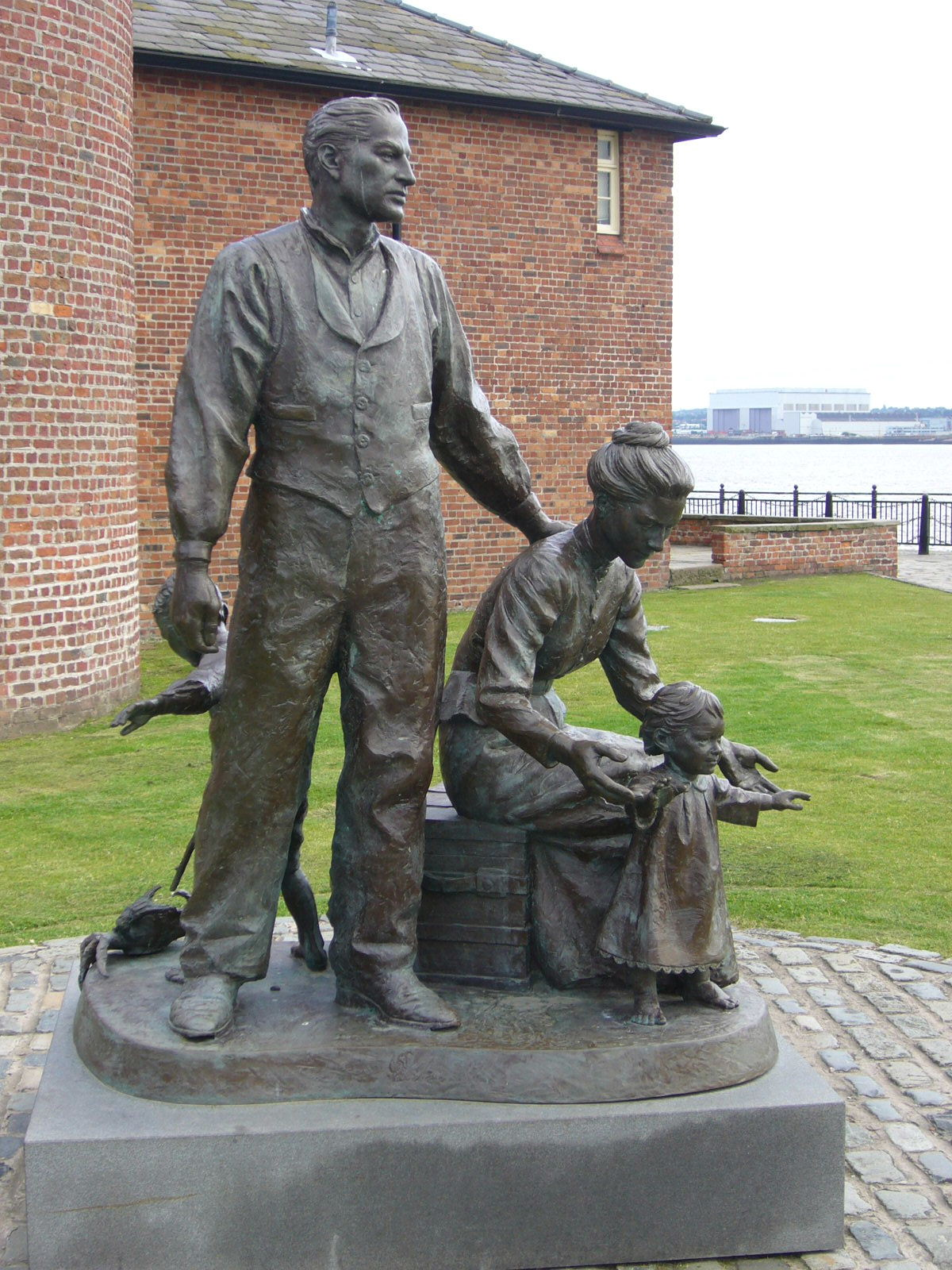
The Sea Trek 2001 commemorative statue in Liverpool

The events for Sea Trek 2001 were in two stages. The first, called "The Gathering", was a tour of tall ships through different European sea ports over a seventeen-day period. Eight sailing ships were rented: the Statsraad Lehmkuhl, Christian Radich, and Sorlandet from Norway; the Europa, Swan fan Makkum, and Antigua from Denmark; the Mir from Russia; and the Mary-Anne from Germany. They departed from Esberg, Denmark on August 7, 2001, and stopped at ports in Denmark, Sweden, Norway, Germany, Scotland, and England, where Mormon emigrants had departed in the nineteenth century. Identical statues were donated to a number of port cities visited during the project. The unusual sight of tall ships at these sites drew crowds and publicity, with thousands paying to tour the historic ships. Around 1,700 boarders paid for passage between different ports and durations at sea.

The second stage, called "The Crossing", took passengers across the Atlantic Ocean, from Portsmouth to New York, at $160 per day for 39 days. Three ships (Statsraad Lehmkuhl, Christian Radich and Europa) sailed on to the Canary Islands, Bermuda then New York City. The final arrival on October 4 in New York Harbor was planned as a media event with a concert, fireworks, and exhibits, to generate publicity and souvenir sales. However, these were cancelled because of the September 11 attacks, which occurred while the ships were underway in the Atlantic Ocean.

== Financial trouble ==
Following the voyage, there was concern for some time that certain bills to the tall ship operators would not be paid, as The Sea Trek Foundation ran short on cash and failed to honor its commitments. However, Property Reserve, Inc, an affiliate of the LDS Church, which was not an organizer or sponsor of the event, stepped in and paid all of the foundation's debts in full. The project reportedly cost more than $4 million, and the LDS Church bought debts of almost $500,000.

== Leadership ==
Sea Trek 2001 was organized by the Sea Trek foundation, which had no affiliation with the LDS Church, a nonprofit founded by William and DeAnn Sadleir of Salt Lake City, Utah.

The following were members of the Sea Trek 2001 Advisory Board:

- Michael K. Deaver (Vice Chairman, International, Edelman Public Relations Worldwide)
- David S. Baxter (Director for London and the English Region, British Telecom)
- Jim Webb (Former Secretary of the United States Navy)
- Admiral Paul A. Yost, Jr. (18th Commandant of the United States Coast Guard)
- Jane Clayson Johnson (Co-Anchor, CBS Early Show)
- Gordon H. Smith (United States Senator of Oregon)
- David W. Checketts (President and CEO, Madison Square Garden)
- Stephen J. Solarz (President, Solarz Associates)
- Rick Burns (Executive Director, The Danish Immigrant Museum)
- Larry King (Host of CNN's Larry King Live)
- Shawn Southwick-King (Entertainer/businesswoman)

== See also ==
- Mormon pioneers
