= Council of School Supervisors & Administrators =

New York City-based trade union

CSA
- Council of School Supervisors and Administrators
- AFSA Local #1
- Founded: January 1962
- Headquarters: New York, NY
- Location: United States
- Members: 12,744 (2014)
- Key people: Mark Cannizzaro, President
- Parent organization: AFSA
- Affiliations: AFL–CIO
- Website: www.csa-nyc.org

The Council of School Supervisors & Administrators (CSA) is a New York City based collective bargaining unit for principals, assistant principals, supervisors and education administrators who work in the New York City public schools and directors and assistant directors who work in city-funded day care. It was founded in 1962 as the Council of Supervisory Associations.

Since its inception, the CSA has played a major role in NYC public schools, including arguing successfully for salary increases, a salary index, and creating a welfare fund for its employees. It became a member of the AFL–CIO in 1971 as part of a new national organization.

== Composition ==
Total membership (US records)
View chart definition.
Finances (US records; ×$1000)
View chart definition.

According to CSA's Department of Labor records since 2005, about half of the union's membership are considered retirees, with eligibility to vote in the union. CSA contracts also often cover some non-members, known as agency fee payers, which usually number comparatively about 2% of the size of the union's membership. Currently, this accounts for 6,698 retirees, and 210 non-members paying agency fees, compared to 6,046 "active" members.

== History ==
=== 1962–1964: Early years ===
In January, 1962, eleven supervisory associations formed the "Council of Supervisory Associations" in order to fight for a salary index. The eleven charter members included supervisory groups from Assistant Principal to Assistant Superintendent. The new, united organization was created to allow school administrators to more effectively advocate for their rights and interests, as well as to help improve the quality of NYC public school education.

In March, 1962, the Board of Education gave the Council de facto recognition and issued a written policy statement recognizing the supervisors' right to present their views regarding their salaries, hours and working conditions.

One of the council's earliest agreements was on a salary index. This index established a relationship between the salaries of supervisors and the teachers they supervised as well as between groups of supervisors. In 1962, this index was partially implemented and resulted in the single highest increase for supervisors in several years. By 1963, the council's representative in Albany secured passage of a mandatory supervisory salary index in New York City, which was then extended in 1964 to include elementary, junior and senior high school principals across the state.

On July 1, 1964, the CSA Major Medical Expense Insurance Plan went into effect, with more than 900 supervisors enrolled.

=== 1965–1966: Recognition by the Board of Education, establishment of Welfare Fund ===
The council was formally recognized by the Board of Education on May 5, 1965, as the representative of all persons eligible for membership in each of its constituent organizations. The memorandum called for monthly consultations between the CSA and the Superintendent of Schools—and at least once a year with the Board of Education—on matters of educational policy, working conditions, salary schedules, and grievance procedures. This was the first agreement of its kind granted to supervisors in the nation.

In Spring, 1965, the "CSA Welfare Fund" was established. The Board of Education agreed to provide $140 per CSA member to the Fund. In June 1966, the trustees decided to provide supplemental major medical insurance, and extended Blue Cross coverage and life insurance as well.

In September, 1966, the CSA established a full-time office in Brooklyn.

=== 1969: comprehensive contract ===
CSA negotiated its first written contract with the Board of Education in the fall of 1969. The agreement, the first comprehensive contract for school supervisors in the United States, ran for a three-year term beginning October 1, 1969. The agreement provided for substantial salary increases, a pension package, grievance machinery with advisory arbitration as the last step, a special complaints procedure in cases of harassment, regular sabbaticals, and an option for preretirement leave in lieu of accumulated sabbaticals.

=== 1971: CSA joins the AFL–CIO ===
Following a membership referendum, CSA joined the AFL–CIO as Local 1 of a new, nationally chartered union, the School Administrators and Supervisors Organizing Committee, later named American Federation of School Administrators (AFSA). Since labor affiliation required individual membership on a one-man, one-vote basis, the name of the CSA was changed from the "Council of Supervisory Associations" to the "Council of Supervisors and Administrators."

=== 1976–1980: collective bargaining agreements, day care directors join ===
The contract negotiated with the Board of Education in September, 1976, gave CSA the right to take a grievance dispute to final and binding arbitration. Successor agreements in 1978 include substantial cost of living adjustments, bonus monies, eight percent raises over the life of the contract, additional sabbaticals, and the elimination of 26 hours of conference time for all tenured supervisors.

In 1976, CSA negotiated the first contract between CSA and the Day Care Council of New York, Inc., covering the Professional Association of Day Care Directors.

=== 1980: contract developments continue ===
A new contract signed in 1980 offered significant changes, including a new group added to the collective bargaining unit (education administrators), an eight percent salary increase over two years, and an increase for per session employees. A new day care contract was also negotiated and led to substantial improvements in salary and working conditions for directors and assistant directors.

=== 1981: Day Care Council / CSA Welfare Fund established ===
The former CSA Welfare Fund became the Day Care Council / CSA Welfare Fund, and eventually covered prescription drugs, expanded hospitalization coverage, dental plans and some emergency services not covered by the employer.

=== 2002: name change ===
In 2002, the "Council of Supervisors and Administrators" became the "Council of School Supervisors and Administrators." CSA also introduced a professional development organization, the Executive Leadership Institute, and eventually opened Educational Leadership Centers in five boroughs. ELI established itself as a premiere program offering training for all its members with a wealth of single topic workshops as well as targeted programs for new and experienced assistant principals, aspiring principals, education administrators and day care directors. In 2008–09, ELI begins a collaboration with and receives funding from the Leadership Academy to provide training for Principals.

=== 2004–2005: retiree chapter forms, day care strike ===
In May, 2004, the executive board approved the formation of a Retiree Chapter. By June, 2005, the Retiree Chapter had over 5,000 members. The executive board voted to merge the CSA Retiree Chapter with the Retired School Supervisors Association. Later that month, the RSSA voted for the merger, as well.

In June, 2004, with no contract in sight, day care directors went on strike in conjunction with day care workers from Local 1707, shutting nearly all the city's 350 city-subsidized day care centers. In May 2005, day care members overwhelmingly voted to ratify a new contract. The contract offered members $1,200 upon ratification, and a 14.5 percent raise over the length of the deal, which expired June 30, 2006. It also added tens of thousands of dollars a year to the CSA Day Care Welfare Fund.

=== 2012: CSA's 50th anniversary; move to Manhattan ===
In 2012, CSA celebrated 50 years since its founding with a gala at the Waldorf-Astoria in New York. Academy Award-winning actor and AFL–CIO member Susan Sarandon introduced AFL–CIO president Richard Trumka, who addressed the guests on the importance of unions and labor in trying economic times, and discussed his thoughts on the upcoming presidential election. He vigorously endorsed the incumbent, President Barack Obama. Approximately 800 CSA members and friends attended the event.

On May 4, 2012, after half a century in Brooklyn, CSA moved its headquarters to 40 Rector Street in lower Manhattan.

== Executive Leadership Institute (ELI) ==
Founded in 2002, the Executive Leadership Institute (ELI) is CSA's professional development program. It is "designed to deliver practical, relevant and essential professional development for today's school leaders." Seminars are led by former administrators on a variety of topics ranging from "Supporting the Low Performing Teacher," "Instructional Leadership for Students with Diverse Needs," to data management and software training.

== Presidents of the CSA ==
- January 1961–June 1963: Dr. Benjamin Strumpf
- 1963–1965: Walter Degnan
- 1965–1967: Stuart Lacey
- 1967–February 1968: Joseph Brennan
- February 1968–June 1968: Michael Romano
- Fall 1968–September 1973: Walter Degnan
- September 1973–February 1974: Emanuel Munice
- 1974–September 1977: Peter O'Brien
- September 1977–February 1978: Jack Zuckerman
- 1978–1988: Ted Elsberg
- 1989–2000: Dr. Donald Singer
- 2000–2006: Jill Levy
- 2006–2017: Ernest Logan
- 2017–2022: Mark Cannizzaro

2023-present: Henry Rubio

== See also ==
- United Federation of Teachers, the AFT local representing most NYC school employees
