= Diann Woodard =

American labor union leader

Diann Woodard (1951 – May 6, 2018) was an American labor union leader.

Born in Birmingham, Alabama, Woodard grew up in Michigan. She studied at Michigan State University and became a schoolteacher in Detroit. She then became a guidance counselor, and next an assistant principal. She joined the American Federation of School Administrators, becoming vice-president of her local union in 1998 and president in 2000.

In 2009, Woodard was elected as president of the national union, in which role she built an alliance with the National Association of Secondary School Principals and the National Association of Elementary School Principals, and successfully secured further funding for the Every Student Succeeds Act. She was also elected as a vice-president of the AFL-CIO.

Woodard died in 2018, while still in office.

Trade union offices
Preceded by Jill Levy	President of the American Federation of School Administrators; 2009–2018	Succeeded by Ernest Logan
