= John Baxter (marine biologist) =

Scottish marine biologist

John M Baxter is a Scottish marine biologist and was (now retired) the principal adviser - marine for Scottish Natural Heritage. He is the chief editor (marine) for the international journal Aquatic Conservation: Marine and Freshwater Ecosystems.

With Scottish Natural Heritage, Baxter was involved with the delivery of numerous policy initiatives including the Marine (Scotland) Act 2010 requirements to designate Marine Protected Areas, the EU Marine Strategy Framework Directive and Habitats Directive. He is a member of several advisory groups including the MASTS International Advisory Committee, the Special Committee on Seals and MarLIN Steering Group.

He is a Trustee of the Scottish Seabird Centre, a marine conservation and education charity which is based in North Berwick, East Lothian.

Baxter works with various marine climate change groups to provide scientific evidence and advice to politicians and policy makers, including The MarClim Survey in Scotland, he is chair of the expert advisory panel for the UK Marine Climate Change Impacts Partnership and vice-chair of the Ocean Acidification - International Reference User Group. Baxter is also a trustee at the Scottish Seabird Centre in North Berwick.

Baxter has published numerous papers and was co-editor of Scotland's Marine Atlas.

In 2014 he became an honorary professor at the University of St Andrews and Heriot-Watt University.
