= Bill Baxter =

Bill Baxter may refer to:

- Bill Baxter (Victorian politician) (born 1946), Australian politician
- Bill Baxter (Queensland politician) (1907–1978), member of the Queensland Legislative Assembly
- Bill Baxter (band) (founded 1982), French band
- Bill Baxter (Scottish footballer) (1924–2002), Scottish footballer
- Bill Baxter (Australian footballer) (1919–1983), Australian footballer

== See also ==
- Billy Baxter (disambiguation)
- William Baxter (disambiguation)
