= William Baxter =

William Baxter may refer to:

== Politicians ==
- William Baxter (Nova Scotia politician) (1760–1832), physician and politician in Nova Scotia
- William Edward Baxter (1825–1890), British politician and traveller
- William Duncan Baxter (1868–1960), mayor of Cape Town, South Africa, 1907–1908
- William Baxter (Scottish politician) (1911–1979), British Labour Party politician, MP 1959–1974
- William Baxter (American politician), American lawyer and member of the Vermont House of Representatives

== Scholars and educators ==
- William Baxter (scholar) (1650–1723), Welsh scholar
- William Baxter (Oxford Botanic Garden curator) (1787–1871), Scots botanist, author of British Phaenogamous Botany
- William Baxter (botanist) (1787–c. 1836), English botanist who collected in Australia
- William Baxter (law professor) (1929–1998), American law professor
- William H. Baxter (born 1949), American linguist
- William Baxter (clergyman) (1820–1880), second president of Arkansas College

== Other ==
- William Giles Baxter (1856–1888), English cartoonist
- William Robert Baxter (born 1960), British hospitality entrepreneur
- William "Bucky" Baxter (1955–2020), American guitarist
- Will Baxter, a fictional character in Eureka Seven anime series

== See also ==
- Bill Baxter (disambiguation)
- Billy Baxter (disambiguation)
