= Alan Baxter =

Alan Baxter may refer to:

- Alan Baxter (actor) (1908–1976), American film actor
- Alan Baxter (author) (born 1970), British-Australian author
- Alan Baxter (politician) (1912–1976), New Zealand politician

== See also ==
- Alain Baxter (born 1973), British skier
- Allan Baxter (disambiguation)
