= Alfred Baxter-Cox =

Australian Army general

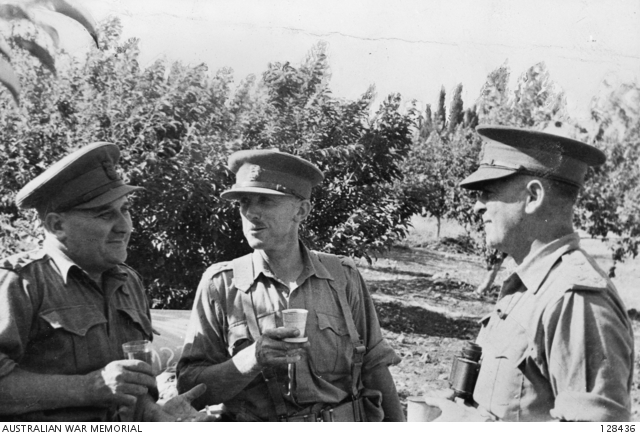
- From left to right: Major General A. S. Allen; Brigadier F. H. Berryman and Brigadier A. R. Baxter-Cox in conversation in Syria, June 1941
- Born: 7 September 1898; Cue, Western Australia
- Died: 18 October 1958 (aged 60)
- Military career
- Allegiance: Australia
- Branch: Australian Army
- Service years: 1916–1946
- Rank: Brigadier
- Commands: Training Depots, Queensland Lines of Communication Area (1942–1943); 25th Brigade (1941); 2/16th Battalion (1940–1941); 13th Brigade (1939–1940); 11th/16th Battalion (1932–1936)
- Conflicts: First World War; Second World War
- Awards: Commander of the Order of the British Empire; Efficiency Decoration; Mentioned in Despatches

Brigadier Alfred Richard Baxter-Cox, CBE, ED (7 September 1898 – 18 October 1958) was an Australian architect and army officer, who served during both the First and Second World Wars.

== Early life ==
Baxter-Cox was born in Cue, Western Australia on 7 September 1898. His father, Alfred Edward Cox, was an architect practising in Perth. Baxter-Cox himself became an architect and draftsman, and served in the Militia prior to his enlistment in the Australian Imperial Force on 13 January 1916.

== First World War ==
Enlisting as an other rank in the Royal Australian Engineers, Baxter-Cox held the rank of sapper when he was posted to Engineering Reinforcements camped on Blackboy Hill, Western Australia on 29 February 1916. He embarked for service overseas on A38 Ulysses on 26 March 1916, disembarking at Marseille, France, on 5 May 1916, after which time he was posted to the Mining Corps. On 19 August 1916 he was promoted to corporal, and on 18 December he transferred to 3rd Tunnelling Coy.

After being selected for commissioning, Baxter-Cox attended officer training at No. 6 Officers Cadet Battalion in Oxford from November 1917 to March 1918 and was appointed as a second lieutenant on 1 May 1918. The confidential report from the Officer Cadet Unit stated that his special qualifications included riding, surveying and speaking French. Upon graduation, he was transferred to the infantry and joined the 4th Battalion in France on 14 May 1918. On 28 November 1918, he was promoted to lieutenant, serving in the Rouen area before being transferred to England in April 1919 as part of the demobilisation process.

On 26 May 1919 he married Ivy Gertrude, daughter of Frank James Sanders, at "S. Cross Holywell Oxford". From June to September 1919 he arranged to attend a three-month course in architecture under Gilbert I Gardner, RIBA, in Oxford; the start date was delayed, and he completed the course on 31 October 1919.

He and his wife returned to Australia on the H.T. Shropshire, embarking on 2 December 1919. He was discharged from the 4th Battalion, 1st AIF, on 7 March 1920, and received the British War Medal and the Victory Medal.

== Between the wars ==
In between the wars, Baxter-Cox returned to the Militia, obtaining the rank of lieutenant colonel and serving as the commanding officer of the 11th/16th Battalion in Western Australia. On 30 April 1936 he was transferred to the unattached list. In May 1939 he took up an appointment as commanding officer of the 13th Brigade, and with it came the rank of temporary brigadier.

== Second World War ==
Following the outbreak of the Second World War in September, Baxter-Cox was appointed to Land Headquarters on 26 April 1940, and enlisted in the Second Australian Imperial Force on 9 May 1940. Shortly afterwards he was posted to the 2/16th Battalion and given responsibility for raising the battalion. He remained in command of the battalion during its deployment to the Middle East before being promoted to temporary brigadier (having relinquished the rank in April 1940) and taking over command of the 25th Infantry Brigade in March 1941. He remained in command of the brigade until June 1941 after which he undertook a variety of positions on the staff of Army Headquarters.

While holding the rank of temporary brigadier, Baxter-Cox was invested as a Commander of the Order of the British Empire on 14 June 1945. He was discharged on 14 August 1946, with his final posting being to the headquarters of the 25th Infantry Brigade with the substantive rank of colonel and the honorary rank of brigadier.

== Later life ==
Baxter-Cox died on 18 October 1958, aged sixty.
