= Joseph John Jenkins =

English painter (1811–1885)

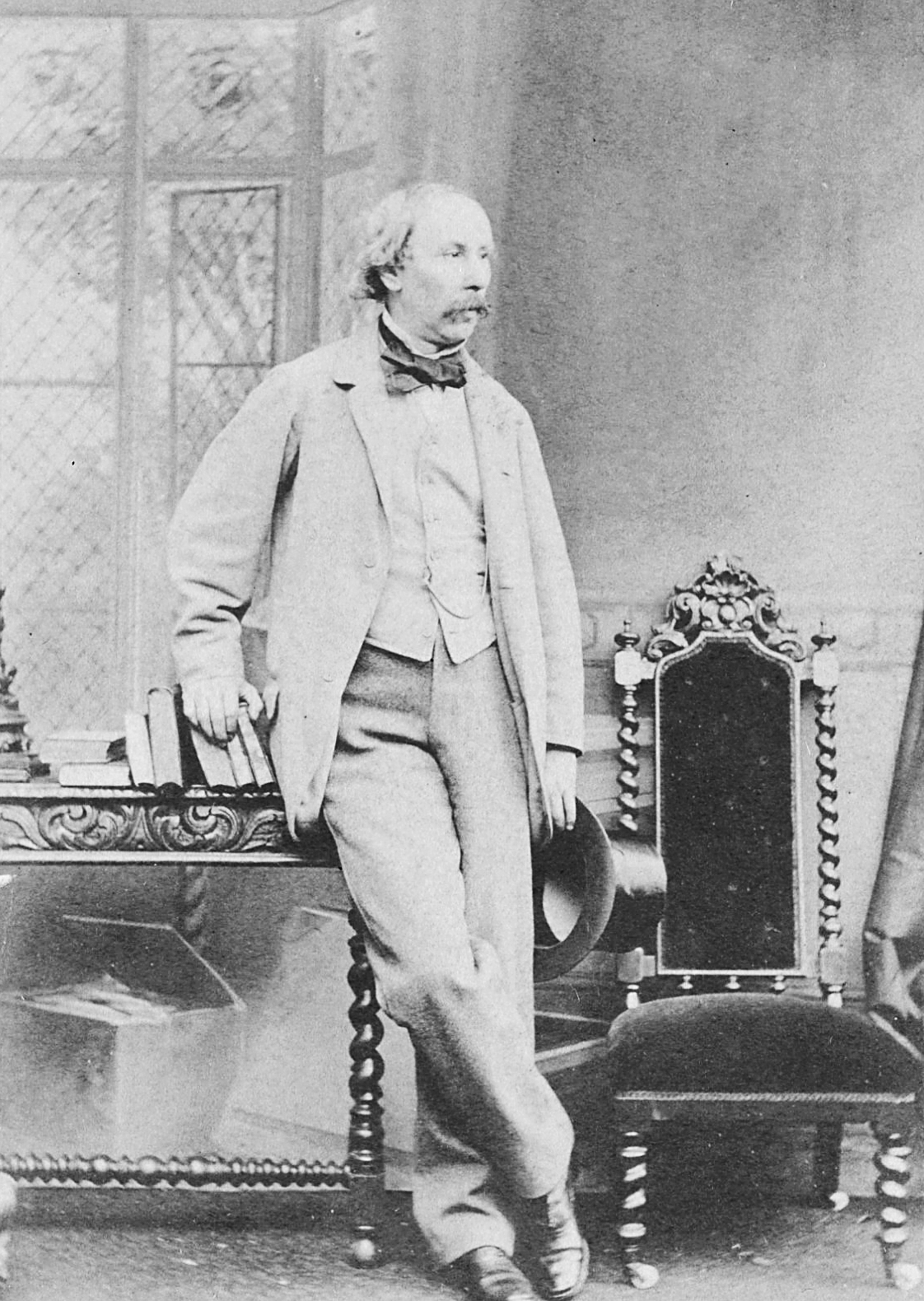
- Born: 1811; London, England
- Died: 9 March 1885 (aged 73–74); London, England
- Occupations: Engraver, Painter

Joseph John Jenkins (1811 – 9 March 1885) was a British engraver and watercolor painter. He is best known for his portraits and landscapes paintings.

== Life ==
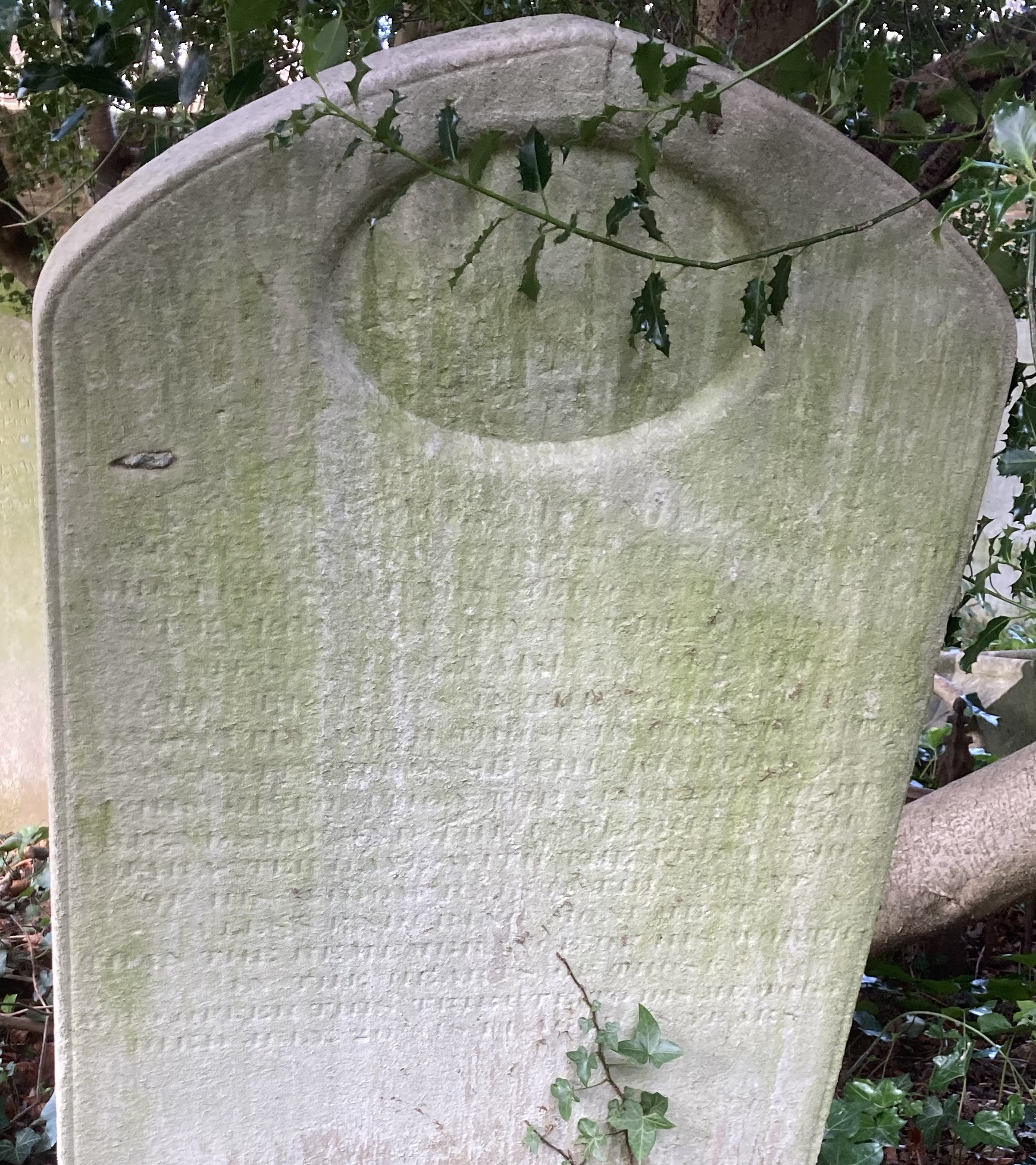
Grave of Joseph John Jenkins in Highgate Cemetery

Joseph Jenkins was born in London in 1811. He was the son of an engraver, who trained him as an engraver. He later abandoned engraving for watercolor painting, focusing on domestic subjects and landscapes.

In 1842, Jenkins was elected an associate of the New Water Colour Society and became a member in 1843. He exhibited fifty-seven drawings at their exhibitions in Pall Mall. In 1847 he left, and joined the Old Watercolour Society; he was elected an associate in 1849, and a full member in 1850. He was its secretary for ten years, from 13 February 1854, and first introduced special private views of its exhibitions for members of the press. He also contributed to exhibitions, sending 271 drawings in all. Some of his drawings were engraved.

In 1884 Jenkins resigned his membership of the society, and died unmarried on 9 March 1885, at 67 Hamilton Terrace, St. John's Wood. He was buried on the western side of Highgate Cemetery.

A history of the Old Society of Painters in Water-colours, for which Jenkins had collected materials, was completed by John Lewis Roget in 1891.

== Works ==
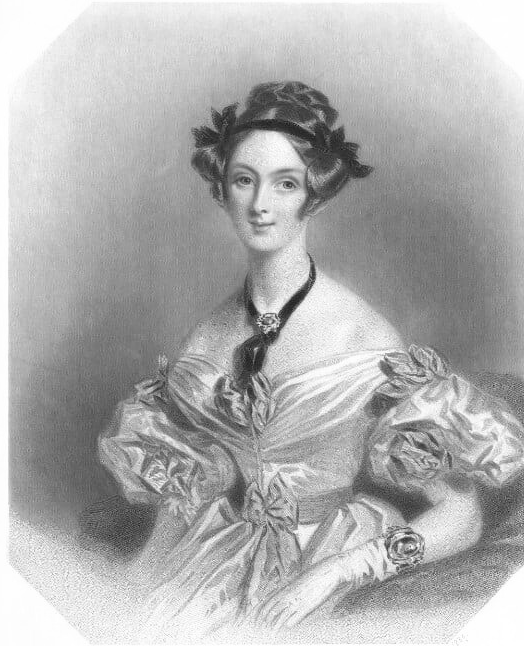
Lady John Russell, engraving by Joseph John Jenkins after Alfred Edward Chalon

Jenkins engraved many portraits, and among other works, Susanna and the Elders, after Francesco Mola, and The Greenwich Pensioner and The Chelsea Pensioner, after Michael William Sharp. He engraved plates and drew illustrations for the annuals, such as The Keepsake and Heath's Book of Beauty, Plates from his drawings are in Charles Heath's Illustrations to Byron and similar works.
