= Glen Baxter =

Glen Baxter is the name of:

- Glen Baxter (artist) (1944–2026), British cartoonist
- Glen Baxter (journalist), Canadian journalist
- Glen E. Baxter (1930–1983), American mathematician
