= Bill Baxter (band) =

- Origin: France
- Genres: Pop
- Years active: 1982 – 1995
- Members: Joe Cool; Louis Primo; Bô Geste

Bill Baxter is a French group composed of Joe Cool (drums), Louis Primo (vocals) and Bô Geste (bass). They are particularly known for their 1985 hit single "Embrasse-moi, idiot!".

== History ==
The group signed with the Virgin label that published their first single "Petit avec des grandes oreilles" in 1982, then the mini-album La Belle vie (which contains seven songs) in 1983. In 1985, Bill Baxter recorded Embrasse-moi, idiot!, a musical produced by Patrick Timsit, inspired by Billy Wilder's film. The single of the same name was a success during the 1985 summer, reaching number 7 on the French SNEP Singles Chart. In 1987, the single "Bienvenue à Paris" was released, which was a duet with the londonian singer Tippa Irie. In the 1990s, the group decided to devote itself to the audio-visual for the TV program Les Guignols de l'Info, including "Reviens JPP reviens" and "La Combine à Nanard".

Laurent Ganem (a.k.a. Joe Cool) also composed the song "Plus rien n'est comme avant", published on Sylvie Vartan's album Sylvie. He is the president of the varieties commission of the SACEM.

== Discography ==
=== Albums ===
- 1986 : Embrasse-moi, idiot!

=== Singles ===
- 1982 : "Petit avec des grandes oreilles"
- 1985 : "Embrasse-moi, idiot" - #7 in France
- 1986 : "Ding Dong"
- 1986 : "L'Amour en capitale"
- 1987 : "Bienvenue à Paris"
