= Alexander G. Baxter =

American businessman and politician

Alexander Gillespie Baxter (November 6, 1859 – August 30, 1934) was an American businessman and politician from New York.

== Life ==
He was born on November 6, 1859, in Bloomingburg, Sullivan County, New York, the son of James Brean Baxter (1837–1903) and Abigail Jane (Monell) Baxter (1834–1891). He attended the public schools and worked on the family farm. In 1878, he joined the United States Marine Corps, and served one year. On October 20, 1880, he married Sarah Elizabeth Teets (1857–1907), and they had three children.

He served as a first lieutenant in the U.S. Army during the Spanish–American War in 1898. After the war he became an undertaker in Newburgh, and later in Schenectady. He was a Coroner of Schenectady County for several terms. On May 10, 1908, he married Sarah Jane Atkinson. During the 1920s he built, and then ran, the Totem Post Camp Ground in Ballston Spa, New York, where he also went to live.

Baxter was a member of the New York State Senate from 1931 until his death in 1934, sitting in the 154th, 155th, 156th and 157th New York State Legislatures; and was Chairman of the Committee on Revision from 1931 to 1932.

He died on August 30, 1934, at his home in Ballston Spa, New York, of a heart attack; and was buried at the Parkview Cemetery in Schenectady.

== Sources ==
New York State Senate
Preceded by Thomas C. Brown	New York State Senate; 32nd District; 1931–1934	Succeeded by Edwin E. Miller
