= Association of Headteachers and Deputes in Scotland =

- Formation: 1975; 51 years ago
- Location: United Kingdom
- Members: ▲2,797 (2025)
- General Secretary: Greg Dempster
- Website: adhs.org.uk

The Association of Headteachers and Deputes in Scotland (AHDS) is a trade union which represents head teachers, depute head teachers and principal teachers from nursery, primary and ASN schools in Scotland. As of 2019 it has over 2,100 members.

== History ==
It was established in 1975. In 2008 it opened membership to primary principal teachers.

AHDS has no political affiliation and is not a member of the Scottish Trades Union Congress.
