= Peter Baxter =

Peter Baxter may refer to:

- Peter Baxter (radio producer) (born 1947), British radio producer and cricket commentator
- Peter Baxter (filmmaker), British-born filmmaker
- Peter Baxter (footballer) (born 1961), Australian rules footballer
- Pete Baxter (Neighbours), fictional character on the Australian soap opera Neighbours
- Peter Baxter, fictional character on British police serial, The Bill
