= Evan Buchanan Baxter =

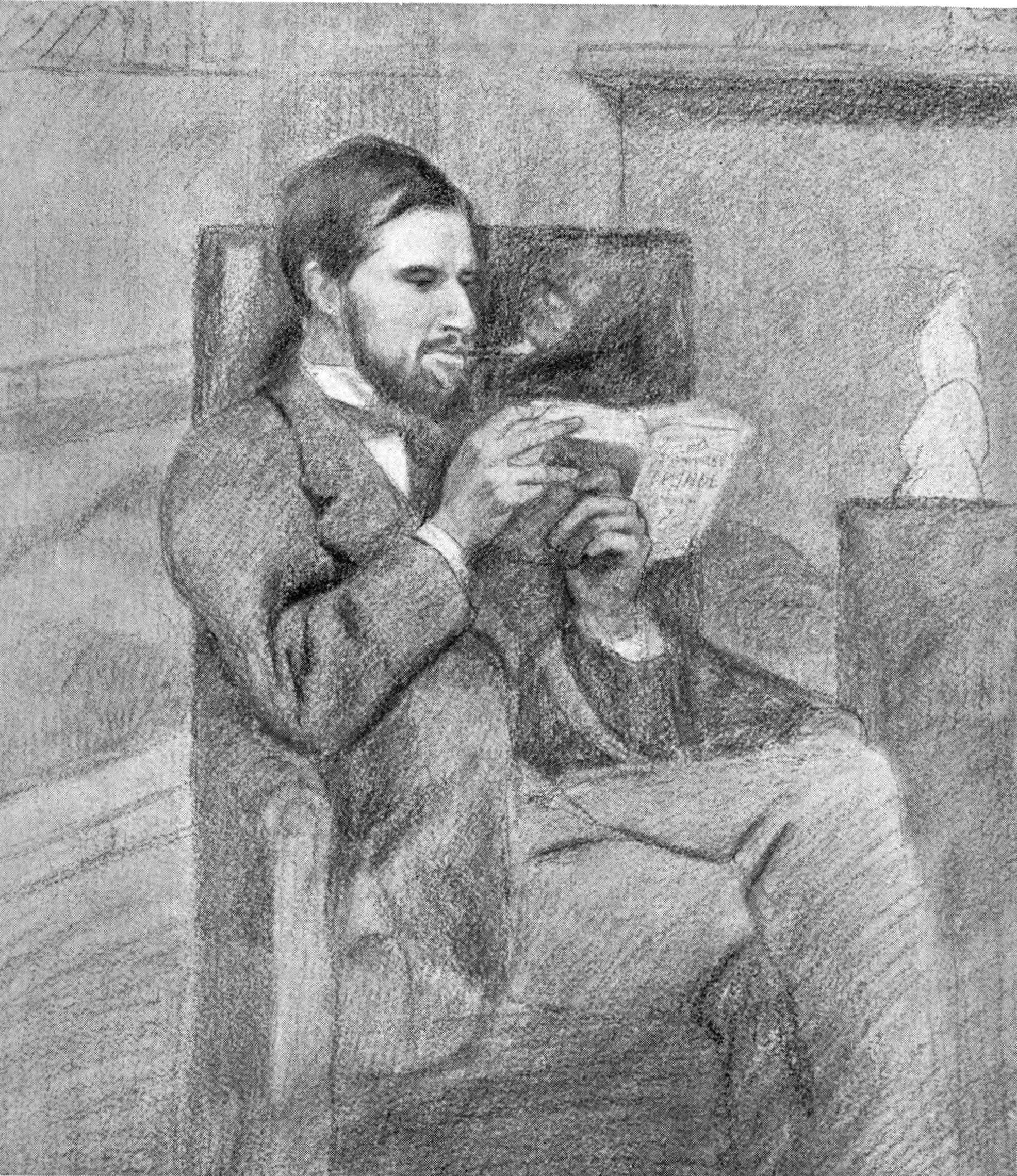
A crayon sketch by John Trivett Nettleship

Evan Buchanan Baxter, M.D., (1844–14 January 1885) was a Russian-born Scottish physician, who lived and worked for most of his life in London.

== Early life ==
Baxter was born in 1844 at St. Petersburg, where his father, James Baxter, had resided for some years as a high official in the education department of the Russian government service. His father also directed the English school at St. Petersburg during his residence there, and in this institution Evan began his education. Soon afterwards, on being appointed government inspector of schools in the province of Podolsk, Russian Poland, his father took up his residence at Kaminetz, where Evan was brought up and educated till the age of sixteen under the care of his parent and an old French tutor. In 1861 he came to England and entered the general literature and science department of King's College London. The next year he obtained an open scholarship in classics at Lincoln College, Oxford, and stayed there for three terms. His university career, however, was interrupted by the illness and death of his father. He returned to Russia to nurse and attend him.

== Career ==
On coming back he resolved not to return to Oxford. He had become a positivist. "The only profession," he said, "which attracted me was that of medicine, holding out, as it did, an opportunity for the study of physical science and a hope of comparative intellectual freedom." In October 1864 he entered the medical department of King's College, and obtained the first Warneford scholarship on his entrance. In 1865 he was elected a junior scholar, and in the same year he carried off the Dasent prize with an essay on "The Minor Poems of Milton". In 1868 he was appointed assistant house-physician to King's College Hospital, in 1868–9 he filled the office of house-physician, and in 1869 he gained the first Warneford prize. In 1870 and 1871 he became Sambrooke medical registrar to King's College Hospital.

It was at this time that he began to be appreciated not only as a man of the first intellectual calibre, but also as a great teacher and an extraordinary careful clinical observer. In 1865 he matriculated in honours at the university of London, and in 1869 graduated M.B., and M.D. in 1870, with high honours. In 1871 he was appointed medical tutor at King's College, and he held this post until 1874, when he was chosen as the successor to Professor Garrod in the chair of materia medica and therapeutics, and as an assistant physician to King's College Hospital; and these offices he held till a month or two before his death. In 1872 he became a member of the Royal College of Physicians, and in 1877 he was elected a fellow. Subsequently, he was appointed an examiner in materia medica and therapeutics, and he also filled for five years the corresponding office in the university of London. He supported medical education for women, and when a medical school for women was started at the Royal Free Hospital, he resigned his position at the Evelina Hospital for a teaching position there. In 1881 he was appointed physician to the Royal Free Hospital.

He died at his residence, Weymouth Street, Portland Place, London, on 14 January 1885.

== Works ==
Baxter translated Rindfleisch's Pathological Histology for the New Sydenham Society; prepared the fourth edition of Garrod's Essentials of Materia Medica; and made some valuable experiments on "The Action of the Chinchona Alkaloids and their Congeners on Bacteria and Colourless Blood Corpuscles" described in the Practitioner (1873). He also drew up an able "Report on the Experimental Study of certain Disinfectants" printed in the Privy Council Reports (1875); and contributed a remarkable article to the British and Foreign Medico-Chirurgical Review in 1877 on the vaso-motor nervous system. His minor writings include a series of physiological notes which he contributed to the Academy for many years.
