= Aquatic Conservation: Marine and Freshwater Ecosystems =

- Discipline: Aquatic science
- Language: English
- Edited by: Heidi Burdett

Publication details
- History: 1991-present
- Publisher: Wiley-Blackwell (United Kingdom)
- Frequency: Bimonthly
- Impact factor: 2.935 (2018)

Standard abbreviations
- ISO 4: Aquat. Conserv.: Mar. Freshw. Ecosyst.
- NLM: Aquat Conserv

Indexing
- CODEN: AQCOEY
- ISSN: 1052-7613 (print); 1099-0755 (web)
- LCCN: 2001212356
- OCLC no.: 43973189

Links
- Journal homepage; Online access; Online archive

Aquatic Conservation: Marine and Freshwater Ecosystems is a bimonthly peer-reviewed scientific journal published by Wiley-Blackwell. The journal is dedicated to publishing original papers that relate specifically to freshwater, brackish or marine habitats and encouraging work that spans these ecosystems. According to the Journal Citation Reports, the journal has a 2014 impact factor of 2.136.
