= Billy 'Silver Dollar' Baxter =

American film producer

- Born: William Baxter; February 8, 1926; Manhattan, New York
- Died: January 20, 2012 (aged 85); New York
- Occupations: Film producer, distributor, public relations
- Years active: 1961–2011

Billy Baxter (February 8, 1926 – January 20, 2012) was born and lived in the West side of Manhattan. He was an American film producer who began his career in the early 1960s. He enlisted in the Navy on his 17th birthday and served aboard the battleship USS New Jersey in the South Pacific during World War II.

== Career ==
At the 1978 Cannes Film Festival, Baxter met producer Richard P. Rubenstein while playing blackjack. Rubinstein said he'd love to double down but was short on francs and couldn't make the bet. "Let me see your cards," Baxter said, and then put up the cash. After payback, the producer asked Baxter if he and Herbert might want to invest in his production of George A. Romero's Dawn of the Dead. Steinmann-Baxter beat the odds and cashed checks for years.

Rubinstein and Romero's Dawn of the Dead is one of the highest-grossing independent movies of all time.

Baxter came out of semi-retirement to serve as an executive producer for the independent film Love Stalker, which was planned to be taken to the Cannes Film Market for 2011.
