= Ken Baxter =

Ken Baxter may refer to:

- Ken Baxter (footballer) (1917–1959), Australian rules footballer
- Ken Baxter (businessman) (born 1949), American real estate investor
- Ken Baxter (rugby league) (1927–1987), English rugby league player
- Ken Baxter (trade unionist) (1893–1975), New Zealand printer and trade unionist
