= George Baxter (cricketer) =

English cricketer

George Baxter (c. 1792–fl. 1830) was an English cricketer who was associated with Surrey and made his debut in 1830. He was born at Hascombe in Surrey in 1792.

== Bibliography ==
- Haygarth, Arthur (1997) [1862]. Scores & Biographies, Volume 2 (1827–1840). Kennington: Frederick Lillywhite. ISBN 978-19-00592-23-9.
