= James Baxter =

James, Jim, or Jimmy Baxter may refer to:

== Arts and entertainment ==
- James K. Baxter (1926–1972), New Zealand poet
- Jimmy Baxter, fictional character in 1937 film Amateur Crook
- James Baxter (animator) (born 1967), British animator
  - He voiced in "James Baxter the Horse" of Adventure Time
- James Baxter (actor) (born 1990), British actor
- Jimmy Baxter, fictional character in 2020s television series Your Honor

== Law and politics ==
- James Phinney Baxter (1831–1921), American politician and historian; mayor of Portland, Maine
- James Clement Baxter (1857–1928), English politician and football club chairman
- James H. Baxter Jr. (1924–2018), American farmer and politician from Delaware

== Sports ==
- James Baxter (sportsman) (1870–1940), English rugby union internationalist and Olympic silver medalist
- Jim Baxter (Australian footballer) (1887–1952), Australian rules footballer
- James Baxter (American football) (1892–1961), American football player and coach
- James Baxter (footballer, born 1904) (1904–?), Scottish footballer for Leicester City, Reading, Torquay United and Boston United
- Jimmy Baxter (footballer, born 1925) (1925–1994), Scottish footballer for Dunfermline Athletic, Barnsley, Preston North End and Morecambe
- Jim Baxter (1939–2001), Scottish international footballer for Rangers, Sunderland, and Nottingham Forest
- Jimmy Baxter (basketball) (born 1980), American-Jordanian basketball player
- James Baxter (sailor) (fl. 2000s–2010s), New Zealand world champion sailor

== Others ==
- James M. Baxter (1845–1909), African-American school principal in Newark, New Jersey
- James Reid Baxter (1865–1908), New Zealand murderer
- James Phinney Baxter III (1893–1975), American historian

== Other uses ==
- James Baxter House, Amberley Village, Ohio, registered historic building

== See also ==
- J. B. Long (James Baxter Long, 1903–1975), American businessman working mainly in the music industry
