= Richard Baxter (disambiguation) =

Richard Baxter (1615–1691) was an English Puritan church leader, poet, hymn-writer, theologian, and controversialist.

Richard Baxter may also refer to:

- Richard Baxter (actor) (c. 1593–c. 1667), English actor
- Richard Baxter (rugby union) (born 1978), English rugby union player
- Richard Xavier Baxter (1821–1904), Roman Catholic priest and Jesuit
- Richard Reeve Baxter (1921–1980), American jurist

== See also ==
- Baxter (disambiguation)
