= Darren Baxter =

Darren Baxter may refer to:

- Darren Baxter (Australian footballer) (born 1965)
- Darren Baxter (English footballer) (born 1981)
