= John Baxter (cricketer) =

English cricketer, born 1800

John Baxter (c. 1800–?) was an English cricketer who was associated with Surrey and made his debut in 1830. He was born at Hascombe in Surrey in 1800.

== Bibliography ==
- Haygarth, Arthur (1996) [1862]. Scores & Biographies, Volume 1 (1744–1826). Kennington: Frederick Lillywhite. ISBN 978-19-00592-23-9.
- Haygarth, Arthur (1997) [1862]. Scores & Biographies, Volume 2 (1827–1840). Kennington: Frederick Lillywhite. ISBN 978-19-00592-23-9.
