= Robert Dudley Baxter =

British economist

Robert Dudley Baxter (3 February 1827, Doncaster – 1875, Frognal) was an English economist and statistician.

== Life ==
Robert Dudley Baxter was educated privately and at Trinity College, Cambridge University. He studied law and entered his father's firm of Baxter & Co., solicitors, with which he was connected until his death. Though studiously attentive to business, he was enabled, as a member of the Statistical and other learned societies, to accomplish much useful economic work.

== Works ==
His principal economic writings were:

- The Budget and the Income Tax, 1860
- Railway Extension and its Results, 1866
- The Panic of 1866; With its Lessons on the Currency Act, 1866
- The National Income, 1868
- The Taxation of the United Kingdom, 1869
- National Debts of the World, 1871
- Local Government and Taxation, 1874

His purely political writings included:

- The Volunteer Movement, 1860
- The Redistribution of Seats and the Counties, 1866
- History of English Parties and Conservatism, 1870
- The Political Progress of the Working Classes, 1871
