= Amy Lynn Baxter =

American model & actress (born 1967)

- Born: September 6, 1967 (age 58); Plymouth, Massachusetts, United States
- Other name: Amy Lynn
- Occupations: Actress; Model
- Style: B-movies; Pornography
- Partner(s): Ed Begley, Jr. (1991); John Scialpi (1992–

Amy Lynn Baxter (born September 6, 1967), known professionally as Amy Lynn, is an American actress, model, and exotic dancer. Her career catapulted in the 1990s after multiple appearances with Howard Stern. She was Penthouse magazine's Pet of the Month for June 1990 and appeared on Geraldo, The Montel Williams Show, and the Maury Povich Show. She appeared in many B-movies and soft core pornography films.

== Early life and education ==
Amy Lynn Baxter was born in Plymouth, Massachusetts. Baxter "couldn't wait to get out" of Plymouth as a teenager. Her school report cards described her as "outrageous" in her behavior and that she needed to "settle down." When she was seventeen, she won a bikini contest in Florida. That year, she moved to Hollywood and lived with Max Baer, Jr., who introduced Baxter to James Woods, whom she would date for a few months.

== Career and life ==
Feminists ask some of the craziest questions. They say 'Men are taking your power away when you do this. You become nothing when you do this.' Well, first of all, nobody's making me do this. I'm doing this by choice. I make a lot of money.

— Amy Lynn Baxter, The Vindicator, 1994

In 1988, Baxter's father paid for her to have breast augmentation surgery to enlarge her breasts, while Baxter worked as an exotic dancer. In a 1992 interview with the Philadelphia Daily News, Baxter said she had paid off the surgery dancing.

Baxter appeared as Pet of the Month in Penthouse in June 1990. Soon thereafter, she was on the Howard Stern Show, covering herself in baby oil during her appearance. She soon appeared on The Howard Stern Show radio program, invoking the same baby oil schtick. She modeled, with Stern, for the cover of his autobiography Private Parts. However, the photo was never used as the cover.

In May 1991, Baxter got engaged to Ed Begley, Jr., who left Annette Bening to date Baxter. By 1992, Baxter was in a relationship with John Scialpi, who owned New York City's Goldfingers strip club. The couple lived on Long Island. She had a baby with Scialpi, and within 2 1/2 months she was back to exotic dancing. As of 1994, Baxter was 26-years-old and her income averaged $250,000. She worked six days a week, making appearances at strip clubs across the US eight weeks out of the year. Her mother travelled with her, helping to care for Baxter's baby and selling merchandise. Part of Baxter's headline show was her baby oil set from The Howard Stern Show.

Baxter appeared in Playboy as part of their Women in Radio pictorial in 1995 for her work on Stern's radio show. That same year, she made promotional appearances for Penthouse, promoting their new cologne, and Famous Rotisserie & Grill in New York.

In 1996, Baxter co-starred as a news reporter, alongside Debbie Rochon, in Broadcast Bombshells. The film is considered one of her best adult films. Baxter auditioned for Robert De Niro for the role as Sheila in the 1999 film Analyze This. The interview involved Baxter reading a sex scene with De Niro. Ultimately, Donna-Marie Recco was given the role.

=== Views on the adult entertainment industry ===
In a 1992 interview, Baxter shared that being a self-described egomaniac gives her the confidence to be an exotic dancer, saying "I love the attention...It's such a great feeling. [The audience] say, 'Wow, look at her,' even before you take your clothes off."
