= Stephen Baxter =

Stephen Baxter may refer to:

- Stephen Baxter (author) (born 1957), English science fiction author
- Stephen Baxter (footballer) (born 1965), Northern Irish football manager and ex-player
- Stephen B. Baxter (1929–2020), American historian
- Stephen Baxter (historian) (1969–2026), historian of Anglo-Saxon and Norman England
- Steven Baxter, a character in the British drama The Second Coming
- Steve Baxter (entrepreneur) (born 1971), Australian investor and entrepreneur
- Steve Baxter (musician) (1952–2020), American songwriter and guitarist
