= Baxter Atkinson =

American union leader

Baxter M. Atkinson is a retired American union leader and schoolteacher.

Atkinson grew up in North Carolina, then became a teacher of reading and mathematics in Hartford, Connecticut. He served as a vice-principal, then as principal of Mark Twain Elementary School. He joined the American Federation of School Administrators, rising to become president of the Hartford Principals' and Supervisors' Association, and treasurer of the Connecticut Federation of School Administrators.

In 2003, Atkinson was elected as president of the union. He stated that his priorities would include campaigning for reform of the No Child Left Behind Act, and encouraging networking and professional development among members. While in office, he created a local for school principals in Puerto Rico, and used union resources to support members in New Orleans affected by Hurricane Katrina. From 2004, he also served as a vice-president of the AFL-CIO. He stood down as leader of the union in 2006, and from the AFL-CIO in 2008.

Trade union offices
Preceded by Joe L. Greene	President of the American Federation of School Administrators; 2003–2006	Succeeded by Jill Levy
