= Frank William Baxter =

Frank William Baxter VC
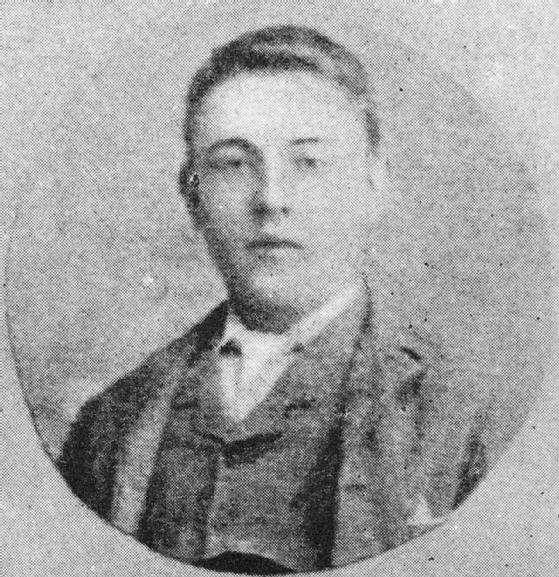
- Born: 29 December 1869; Woolwich, London, England
- Died: 22 April 1896 (aged 26); Umguza, Mashonaland, Rhodesia
- Burial place: Bulawayo Town Cemetery, Bulawayo, Zimbabwe
- Military career
- Allegiance: Rhodesia
- Branch: Bulawayo Field Force
- Rank: Trooper
- Unit: Grey's Scouts
- Conflicts: Matabeleland Rebellion
- Awards: Victoria Cross

Frank William Baxter VC (29 December 1869 – 22 April 1896) was a Rhodesian recipient of the Victoria Cross, the highest and most prestigious award for gallantry in the face of the enemy that can be awarded to British and Commonwealth forces.

== Details ==
Born on 29 December 1869 in Woolwich, London, Baxter was 26 years old, and a trooper in the Bulawayo Field Force during the Matabeleland Rebellion, when, on 22 April 1896 (Matabeleland Rebellion), near Umguza, Mashonaland, Rhodesia (now Zimbabwe), Baxter gave up his horse to a wounded comrade who was lagging behind, with an enemy force in hot pursuit. Baxter then tried to escape on foot, hanging on to the stirrup of another mounted scout of the Bulawayo Field Force, until he was hit in the side by enemy fire. He let go of the stirrup and died moments later.

Baxter is buried at Bulawayo Town Cemetery, Bulawayo, Zimbabwe.

== The Medal ==
Baxter's medal is on display in the Lord Ashcroft VC collection in the Imperial War Museum in London.
