= Mary Ann Baxter =

Scottish philanthropist (1801-1884)

Mary Ann Baxter (1801 – 19 December 1884) was a philanthropist in the Scottish city of Dundee.

== Family ==
Mary Ann Baxter was the daughter of William Baxter, founder of the Baxter Brothers And Co. Ltd. textile business.

She outlived all of her siblings, her brothers Edward (general merchant), Sir David Baxter, 1st Baronet, John, and William (who worked in their father's textile business), and her sister Eleanor.

== Notable achievements ==
Mary Ann Baxter was the co-founder of University College, Dundee, the forerunner of the University of Dundee and also, with her brother, Sir David Baxter (1793-1872) of the Technical Institute of Dundee which opened in 1888 and led to the founding of Duncan of Jordanstone College of Art and Design. The Deed of endowment and trust in the University archives, signed in 1881 when Mary Ann Baxter would have been 80 years old, lists the donation of £120,000 for the creation of an institution of higher education in Dundee from Miss Mary Ann Baxter of Balgavies assisted by her relative, Dr John Boyd Baxter, Esq., LL.D., an alumnus of St Andrews and Procurator Fiscal of Forfarshire who contributed nearly £20,000. The deed stated that the college should promote "the education of persons of both sexes and the study of Science, Literature and the Fine Arts". Mary Ann Baxter's insistence on the education of women meant that the college's alumni include the social reformer Mary Lily Walker and Scotland's first female professor, Margaret Fairlie. As a philanthropist, together with her sister Eleanor and her brother Sir David, Mary Ann Baxter also founded Baxter Park, buying 37 acres of fields in 1861 and commissioning designer Sir Joseph Paxton to design a park "with the view of affording to the working population the means of relaxation and enjoyment after their hard labour and honest industry".

== Recognition ==
A blue plaque marking her place in the Dundee Women's Trail is sited on Perth Road.
