= William Charles Baxter =

William Charles Baxter (c. 1859 – 6 September 1936) was a carnival rides operator who ran a celebrated merry-go-round at St Kilda, Victoria, Australia. He has also been credited as the first to screen a moving picture film in Australia, and was the first to screen a film of the Melbourne Cup on the evening of the event. He was closely associated with his cousin, Frederick William Baxter (25 January 1858 – 27 May 1937) who later operated a merry-go-round in Glenelg, South Australia.

== History ==
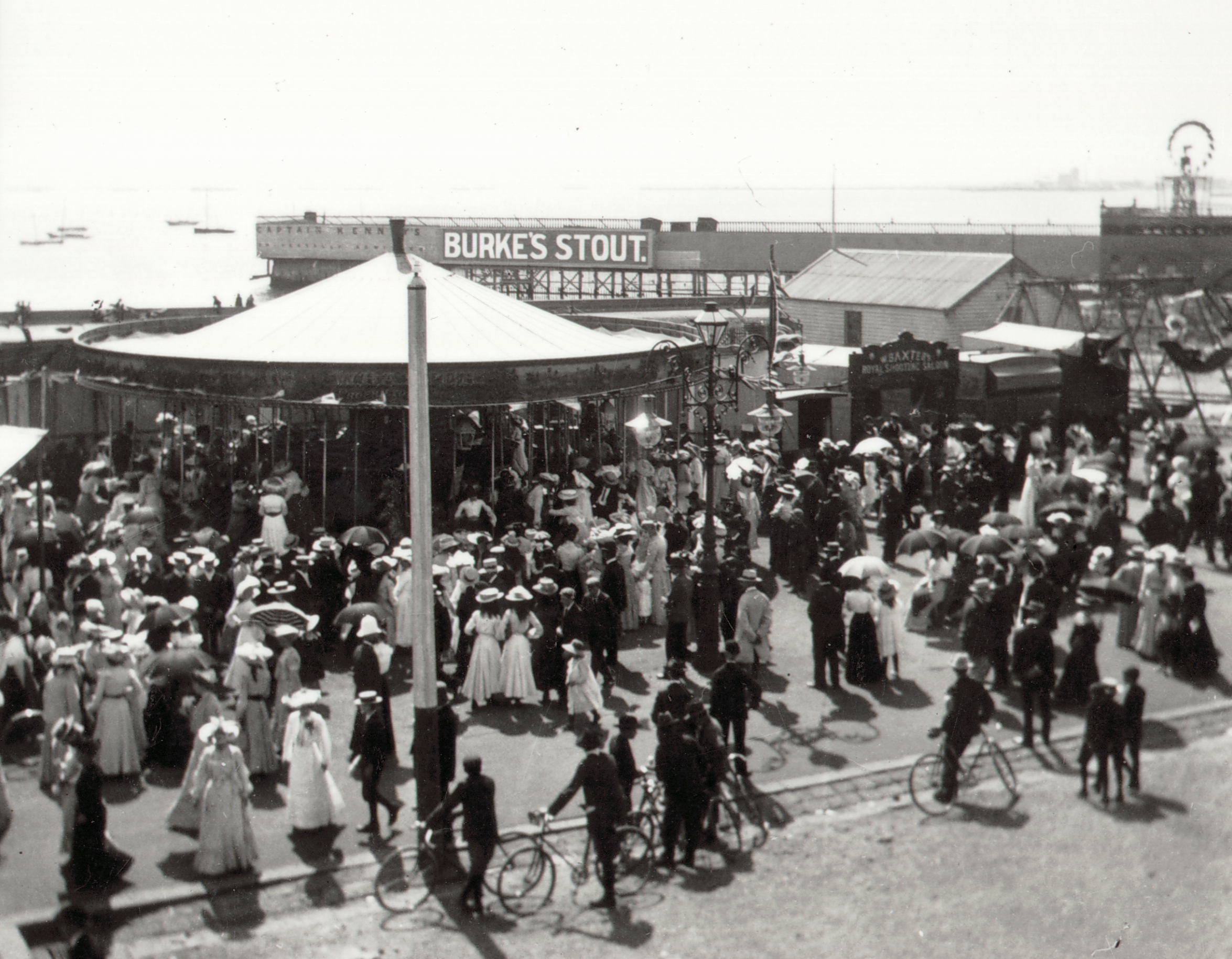
Baxter's merry-go-round at St Kilda c. 1900

Baxter arrived in Melbourne in 1879–80 or 1881 with the first "steam roundabout" to be imported into Australia, advertised as "Seal and Baxter's Steam Circus". (Note: Nothing has yet been found about C. F. Seal (c. 1826 – 6 March 1911).) It was a showy affair, with painted ponies and carriages which were driven around a circular arrangement of mirrors by a horizontal steam engine, which also pumped a steam organ "playing 18 tunes". They toured Victoria, South Australia, and New South Wales with their swing and roundabout, and were pioneers of the amusement business at St Kilda.

Baxter and Seal dissolved their partnership in Adelaide in 1885, their roundabout, steam engines and swing-boats were put up for auction and Baxter became sole operator. During his career as a sideshow operator he imported many roundabouts from Britain and America, and had several boat swings manufactured to his own design. Repainting of these novelties was undertaken in his own workshop, the more artistic work being undertaken by H. Bush, and maintenance of the organs by Feiss Brothers of 238 Chapel Street, Prahran.

In 1896 he imported R. W. Paul's newly invented "cinematographe" projector to Victoria, and in October of that year screened some films as part of a programme of entertainment at Rickards' Melbourne Opera House in Bourke Street. He has been credited as the first to screen a moving picture film in Australia, however on 22 August 1896 stage magician Carl Hertz demonstrated his cinematographe in Melbourne as part of his show at Rickards' Opera House.

He has been credited with, in 1897, importing Australia's first X-ray apparatus and the first Edison phonograph. This was only a year after Australia's top physicists first replicated Röntgen's discovery

Professors Bragg in Adelaide, Lyle in Melbourne, and Threlfall in Sydney had in 1896 replicated Röntgen's work and proved its application to surgery. using locally fabricated copies of the Crookes tube as developed by Roentgen. In Adelaide Samuel Barbour, of Faulding Ltd, was taking x-ray "skiagraphic" (Greek: σκιά "shadow") photographs in late 1896 as a medical profession.

and had at least one example for sale to "showmen and others". A year later he showed a programme of magic lantern slides made by x-rays to members of his Loyal Canterbury Lodge in 1898, but no mention whether these were locally produced or supplied by such as the London Stereoscopic Company.

Perhaps his greatest coup was showing films of the 1897 Caulfield Cup and Melbourne Cup at the Melbourne Opera House on the evenings of the race. The events had been captured on film and developed the same day by photographer Robert William Harvie (died 5 October 1922) and inventor Ernest J. Thwaites (c. 1873 – 12 July 1933).

He retired from showground business c. 1915, and his last "merry-go-round" was sold to his cousin Frederick in Glenelg. He died at his home in Simmons Street, South Yarra, aged 77 years, and his remains buried at Brighton General Cemetery.

=== Family ===
Baxter married Harriet Tebay (1855 – 28 July 1935) Their children included:

- William Donne Baxter (1879–1966) married Ella Florence Collier on 19 April 1905, divorced 1914. Did not attend father's funeral.
- Frank Baxter (1881–1956) maybe of 35 Davis Avenue, South Yarra
- George Tebay/William? Baxter (1882–1956)
- Elizabeth Ann "Bessie" Baxter (1884–) married Johansen.
- Louise/Louisa Mary Baxter (1885–1978) married Claude Oswald Paris (8 March 1886 in Dunedin, NZ – 1953) on 20 February 1911
- Percy Hopetoun Baxter (1890–1967) married Millie Peacock on 5 May 1926
- (David) John "Jack" Baxter (c. April 1895 – 1981? 10 December 1964?) enlisted August 1914 wounded in France

They had a home 47 Pine Street, South Yarra, later 53 Simmons Street, South Yarra

== Frederick William Baxter ==
Frederick William Baxter (25 January 1858 – 27 May 1937) was born in Greenwich, England, son of a steamer captain who operated between the Thames and France (other sources have him a tugboat owner). He was educated at Harmer House School, corner of The Grove and Saddington Street, Gravesend, Kent, and was employed on the sailing ship Elizabeth Nicholson (perhaps a sister ship to Cutty Sark) until 1875, when he left the sea for life in Victoria, Australia. He found work with the Cross family, who had a farm in the Heywood district near Portland then, with his brother Frank (born c. 1856), drove cattle in Queensland before joining his showman cousin W. C. Baxter in partnership in St Kilda, Victoria. In 1885 he brought one of his cousin's roundabouts to Glenelg, South Australia, from where he returned briefly to England, in order to imported the latest in steam roundabouts, one of the first to feature galloping horses, and did not return to South Australia until 1889. He must have brought his roundabout to the Port Adelaide Regatta in 1891, as the ride introduced by a competitor the following year sparked unfavourable comparison ". . . a very poor substitute for Baxter's merry-go-round of last year, which was driven (including the organ) by steam-power".

He was associated with his cousin in importing one of Robert Paul's "Theatrograph" projectors, which they set up in the Melbourne Opera House in October 1896. Harry Rickards subsequently purchased the projector, and Baxter imported a later model, which arrived with a set of films in time for Christmas.

He was in country South Australia in 1904, touring Moonta, Kadina, and no doubt other centres with his "Riding Gallery" (merry-go-round). Tours of Victoria in 1916 included Colac. It may have been in 1905 that he first set up in Colley Reserve, Glenelg the steam roundabout called "W. Baxter's Royal British Riding Gallery of Galloping Horses", which had recently been redecorated by painter R. March.

Both men were fined, separately, in 1916 for running unregistered and unlicensed merry-go-rounds; Frederick in St Kilda and William at South St Kilda. St Kilda remained a profitable venue however. He ran amusements at St Kilda for 22 years, then when competition made this venue unprofitable, took a six-year lease on a site in Glenelg. While other fairground operators moved to electric motor drive for their roundabouts, Baxter retained the steam engine for its "unending interest for the boys". At some stage he purchased a home on Brighton Road, Glenelg. He occupied a site at Colley Reserve, Glenelg, for much of the early 20th-century, though being required to apply for extensions to the lease at intervals dictated by the council

Fred died in 1937 and his son his son Arthur, who had been working for his father as the roundabout's engineer, took over its operation. Every horse had the name of a popular Australian racehorse on its nameplate, and each year the ride was dismantled and reassembled at the Royal Adelaide Show. Much attention was given to keeping it working smoothly and its appearance bright and polished; it was still a great seaside attraction in 1950, and for the Baxters a very profitable business.

=== Family ===
Baxter married Emily Louisa [Leaman ?] (1870 – 22 May 1926) She died in Glenelg but funeral held in Brighton, Victoria.

- (Louise) Alice Baxter married Louis Herbert Le Rossignol on 22 July 1916, his second wife. Lived Leslie Street, Richmond, Victoria.
- Dorrie Baxter of Glenelg. It is likely she was an accomplished pianist.
- Victor E. Baxter (1899–1969) twin son married Beryl. He was a successful tenor, of Victoria. His singing career was booming in the late 1920s and early 1930s, then nothing further save one appearance in 1946.
- .Ernest Baxter (1899– ) twin son, lived in Ouyen, Victoria, married Doris Ivy Sulman on 7 May 1935, lived Hopetoun, Victoria
- Arthur Verdon Baxter (died 1971) married Irene Henderson Goldner of Glenelg on 25 February 1948. He worked for his father as engineer of the roundabout and on his death inherited the business.

While in Victoria (eg 1916) they had a home "Greenhithe" in Bismarck Street (from January 1917 at Baxter's instigation, Thames Street) Heidelberg In South Australia their home was "Greenhithe", 33 Brighton Road, Glenelg, (adjacent the automatic telephone exchange) to 1927 when he advertised leaving for Victoria., however he either returned a few years later or never left.
