= Thomas Baxter =

Thomas or Tom Baxter may refer to:

- Thomas Baxter (mathematician) (fl. 1732–1740), British mathematician and schoolmaster
- Tom Baxter (born 1973), English singer
- Tom Baxter (Australian footballer) (1884–1959), Australian footballer
- Tom Baxter (footballer, born 1893) (1893–?), English footballer who played for Chelsea and Gillingham
- Tom Baxter (footballer, born 1903) (1903–1987), English footballer who played for Wolverhampton Wanderers and Port Vale
- Thomas Baxter (painter) (1782–1821), English painter
- Tommy Baxter (c. 1930–2014), New Zealand rugby league player
- Thomas Baxter (rugby union) (1935–2019), Australian rugby union player and engineer
