= Sir David Baxter, 1st Baronet =

- portrait by John Watson Gordon
- Born: 15 February 1793; Dundee
- Died: 13 October 1872; Cupar
- Occupation: Businessperson
- Spouse: Elizabeth Montgomerie
- Father: William Baxter
- Relatives: Mary Ann Baxter, Edward Baxter

Sir David Baxter, 1st Baronet (1793–1872), was a linen manufacturer in Dundee, Scotland, and a baronet. He also performed a considerable amount of philanthropic work, benefiting his home city of Dundee and more widely Scottish education.

== Early life ==
Baxter was the second son of William Baxter, of Balgavies, Angus, and was born in Dundee on 15 February 1793. He was educated at the Dundee Academy.

== Business career ==
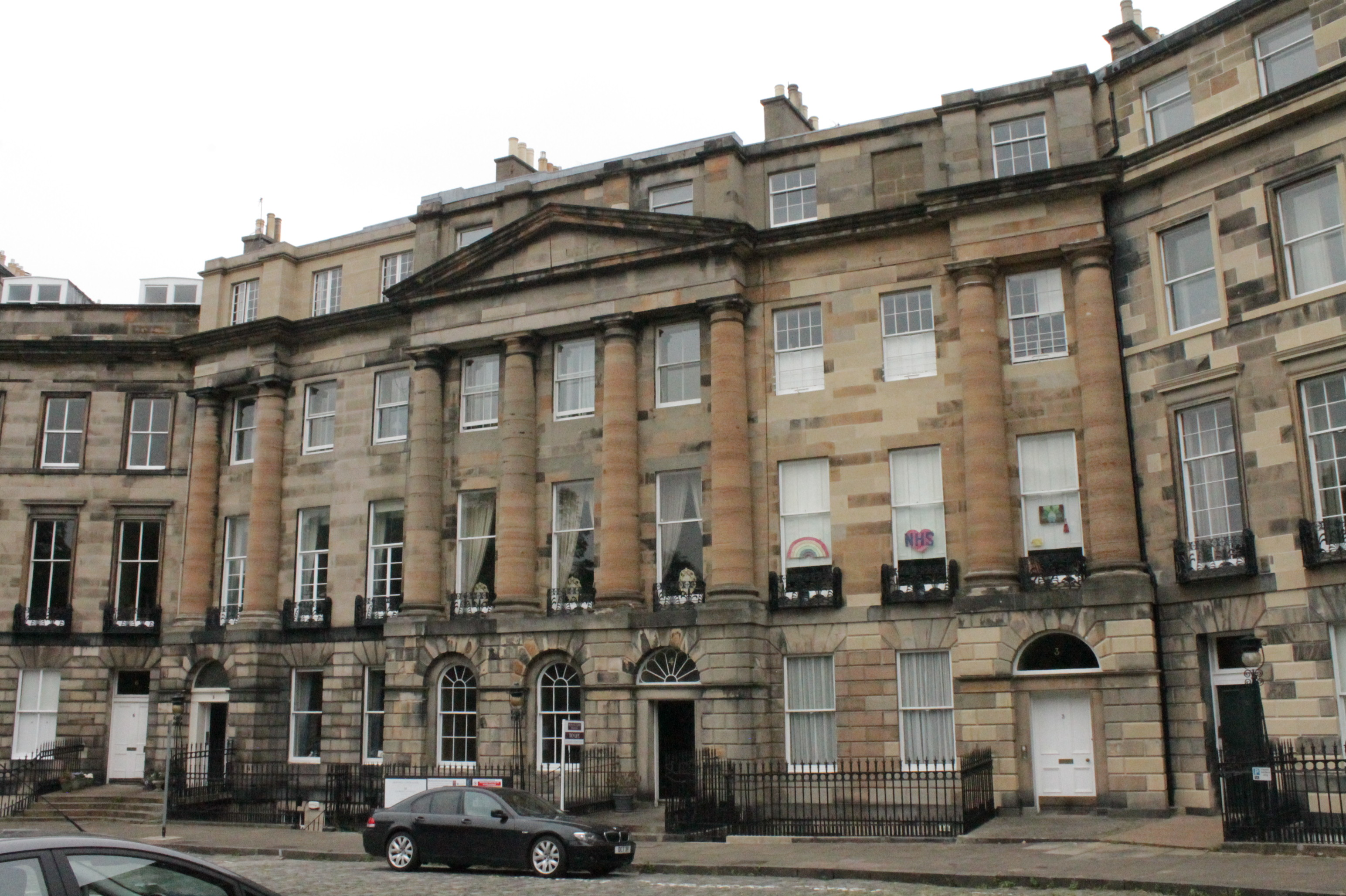
3,4,5 Moray Place

While still a young man, he became manager of the Dundee Sugar Refining Company. The concern was never prosperous, and notwithstanding his prudent and energetic management it collapsed in 1826.

Thereupon he became partner in the linen manufacturing firm of Baxter brothers, which included his father William and his two younger brothers. William had begun business with a mill in Glamis and in 1822 had started business in Dundee with his eldest son Edward, who left the company in 1825 to commence the business of a general merchant. From the time that David Baxter joined the firm he was practically its head, and on the death of his two brothers and his father within a few years afterwards he and the former manager of the works Peter Carmichael remained the sole partners. They were later joined by William Ogilvie Dalgleish, who was married to David Baxter's niece.

In 1828 an attempt had been made by him to introduce power-loom weaving, but after a short trial it was abandoned until 1836, when its revival was followed by widespread success. Through the mechanical skill of his partner Peter Carmichael in perfecting the machinery, and the business capacity and tact of David Baxter, the firm speedily became one of the largest manufacturing houses in the world; and to its success may be in a large degree ascribed the position which Dundee attained as the chief seat of the linen manufacture in Britain in the nineteenth century.

Sir David Baxter was also a partner in Turnbull & Co, later Boase & Co, which operated a bleachfield at Claverhouse, and was later fully taken over by Baxter Brothers.

== Public affairs and philanthropy ==
Although much immersed in the cares of business, Baxter took an active, if not very prominent, share in public affairs. In 1825 he was chosen a police commissioner, and in 1828 a guild councillor and member of the harbour board. A liberal in politics, he took a lively interest in parliamentary elections, both in Dundee and in the county of Fife, where in 1856 he purchased the estate of Kilmaron.

His enlightened regard for the welfare of his native town was, however, manifested chiefly in noble and generous benefactions which have given his name one of the highest places of honour in its annals. The most notable of these was perhaps his presentation, along with his sisters, of thirty-seven acres of land to Dundee as a pleasure garden and recreation ground, which, under the name of the Baxter Park, was opened by Earl Russell in September 1863. A £20,000 bequest on his death in 1872 led to the foundation of a mechanics' institute in 1888. Known then as the Dundee Technical Institute, it was the fore-runner of Abertay University.

The foundation of the Albert Institute of Literature, Science, and Art (now the McManus Galleries) was due also chiefly to his liberality and that of his relatives; and in connection with Dundee Royal Infirmary he erected a convalescent home at Broughty Ferry at a cost of £30,000.

More important than his benefactions to Dundee were his gifts in behalf of higher education in Scotland. Besides building and endowing at Cupar, Fife a seminary for the education of young ladies, he established several important foundations in the University of Edinburgh, including scholarships in mathematics, philosophy, physical science, and natural science, each of the annual value of £60; and a chair of engineering, with an endowment of £5,000, which was supplemented by an annual parliamentary vote of £200.

On 24 January 1863 he was created a baronet 'of Kilmaron in the County of Fife'.

Soon thereafter he acquired 5 Moray Place, a huge Georgian townhouse on the Moray Estate in western Edinburgh.

== Death and legacies ==
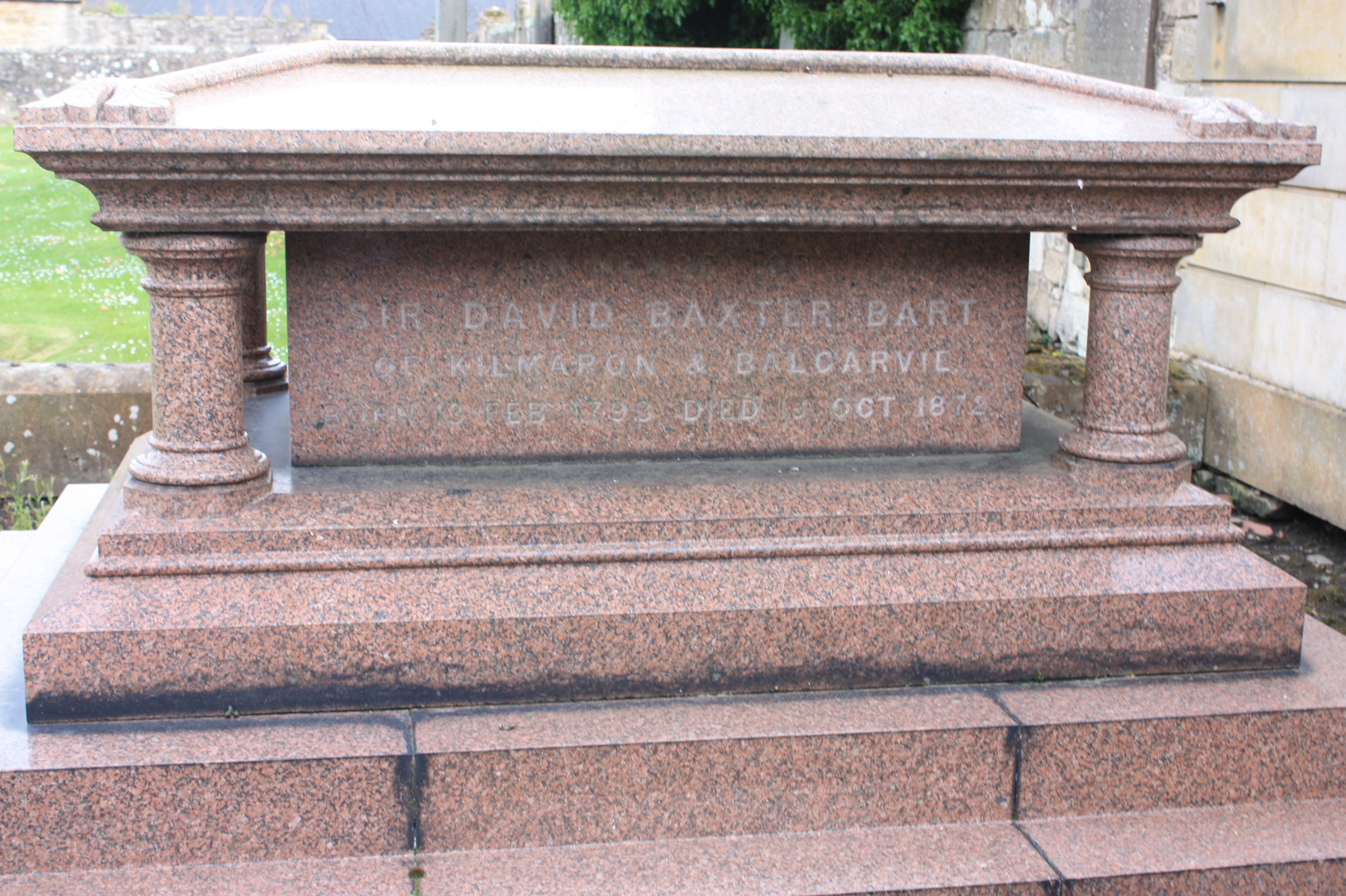
The grave of Sir David Baxter, Cupar in Fife

He died 13 October 1872. Of Baxter's heritable and personal property, valued at £1,200,000, one half was divided among near relatives, and the other among distant relations and public institutions, the largest legacies being £50,000 to the Free Church of Scotland, £40,000 to the University of Edinburgh, and £20,000 towards the foundation of a mechanics' institute in Dundee, later Abertay University.

Before his last illness Baxter's attention was occupied with a scheme for linking Dundee with the neighbouring University of St Andrews, and although he did not survive to carry out his plans, his relatives helped found University College, Dundee. Towards the purchase of buildings and general equipment of this college one of his sisters Mary Ann Baxter who died unmarried on 19 December 1884, contributed £150,000.

== Family ==
In 1833 Baxter married to Elizabeth (1801–1882), daughter of R. Montgomerie, of Barrahill, Ayrshire. She survived him, and they had no children. She was buried with him in the old churchyard in the centre of Cupar in Fife, just west of the church.

Baronetage of the United Kingdom
New creation	Baronet (of Kilmaron); 1863–1872	Extinct
