= David S. Baxter =

Scottish LDS Church leader (1955–2025)

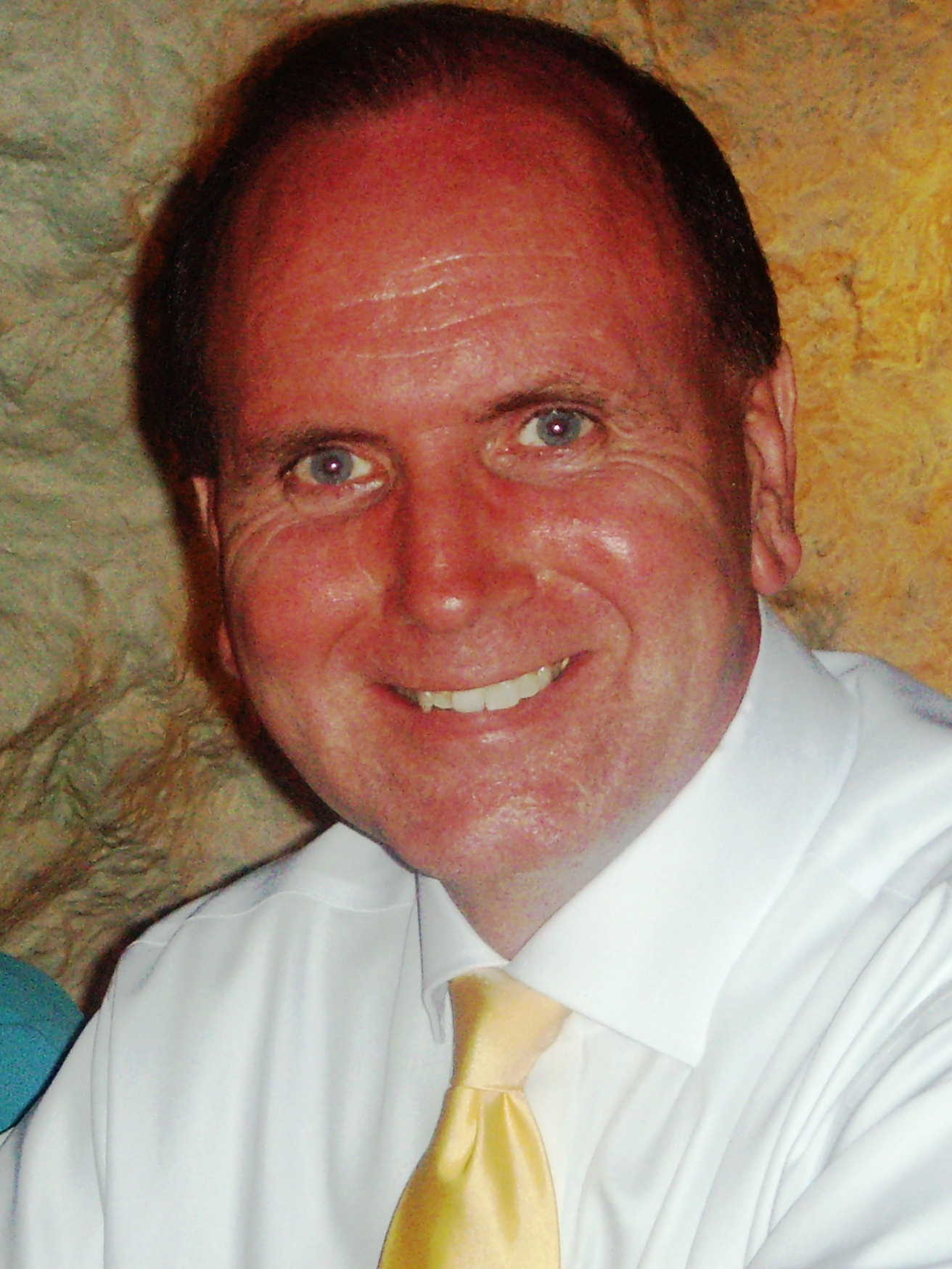
- Baxter in 2008

First Quorum of the Seventy
- 1 April 2006 – 1 August 2025
- Called by: Gordon B. Hinckley

Personal details
- Born: David Steward Baxter; 7 February 1955; Stirling, Scotland
- Died: 9 September 2025 (aged 70); Devizes, Wiltshire, England
- Spouse(s): Dianne Lewars (m. 1979; died 2022)
- Children: 4

David Steward Baxter (7 February 1955 – 9 September 2025) was a Scottish general authority of the Church of Jesus Christ of Latter-day Saints (LDS Church) from 2006 until his death. A native of Scotland, and a resident of England at the time of his call, he was the third general authority who was native to the United Kingdom and also living there at the time of his call.

== Early life and career ==
Baxter's parents divorced when he was five years old and his mother remarried twice in his childhood. During his youth, Baxter was taken from his home by the state on more than one occasion. Baxter joined the LDS Church, along with his mother and siblings, when he was 12 and shortly after this the family moved to Surrey. This is where Baxter first met his future wife, Dianne Lewars. They were in the same LDS Church ward and were two of only five Latter-day Saints at their school. Baxter then attended the University of Wales where he graduated with a BSc in economics.

After graduating, Baxter served a mission for the church in the Scotland Edinburgh Mission, starting in 1976. For 10 months of his mission, he was the branch president in Lerwick in the Shetland Islands.

Baxter served for a time as a senior director at British Telecom. He also served as the UK Government's Director for International Trade & Investment for Greater London and as a member of the Board of Capacity Builders, a UK Home Office Agency. He previously served as chairman of the Board of Business Link for London (small business advice service), and as a member of the Board of London First, on the CBI London Council, and as Deputy Chairman of the East Anglian Ambulance NHS Trust.

== LDS Church service ==
Baxter was called as a bishop at age 25. He later served as a counselor in a stake presidency, as president of the Ipswich England Stake, and as a counselor in the presidency of the England London Mission. From 2002 to 2006 he was an area seventy, which included serving as a counselor in the presidency of the church's Europe West Area from 2004 to 2006. After his call as general authority, Baxter served as a counselor in the church's New Zealand/Pacific Islands Area and then as president of the Pacific Area, each based in Auckland, New Zealand. In 2012, he addressed the church's general conference and focused on single parents, "Please never feel that you are in some kind of second-tier, subcategory of church membership, somehow less entitled to the Lord's blessings than others. In the kingdom of God, there are no second-class citizens.".

In 2009, Baxter was diagnosed with brain cancer after suffering a seizure while touring a mission in Australia. He underwent brain surgery and radiation therapy for the treatment of this illness. As a result, he was released from the area presidency, returned to Salt Lake for medical treatment, and was placed on medical leave from his assignments. Following some treatment and recovery, he resumed service at church headquarters, but was later again placed on medical leave. As of 1 August 2025, he was released from active service and designated as an emeritus general authority.

== Personal life and death ==
After returning from his mission, Baxter and his wife were married and they were the parents of four children. Dianne died on 25 March 2022, at the age of 66.

Baxter died in Devizes, Wiltshire on 9 September 2025, at the age of 70.

== Bibliography ==
- A Perfect Brightness of Hope by David S. Baxter (Deseret Book, 30 April 2012, ISBN 978-1609070120)
- Peace, be Still by David S. Baxter (Cedar Fort, 8 October 2013, ISBN 978-1462113408)
- What Good Men Do by David S. Baxter (Cedar Fort, 14 October 2014, ISBN 978-1462114894)
