= Baxter baronets =

Extinct baronetcy in the Baronetage of the United Kingdom

There have been two Baronetcies created for persons with the surname Baxter, both in the Baronetage of the United Kingdom. Both creations are extinct.

The Baxter Baronetcy, of Kilmaron in the County of Fife, was created in the Baronetage of the United Kingdom on 24 January 1863 for the Scottish textiles manufacturer and benefactor David Baxter. The title became extinct on his death in 1872.

Escutcheon of the Baxter baronets of Kilmaron,

The Baxter Baronetcy, of Invereighty in the County of Forfar, was created in the Baronetage of the United Kingdom on 21 June 1918 for the Scottish manufacturer and politician Sir George Baxter, for "public and local services". He had previously stood unsuccessfully as a parliamentary candidate for Montrose in 1895 and Dundee in 1910. Baxter was the younger son of William Edward Baxter and had been knighted in 1904. The title became extinct on his death in 1926.

== Baxter baronets, of Kilmaron (1863) ==
- Sir David Baxter, 1st Baronet (1793–1872)

== Baxter baronets, of Invereighty (1918) ==
Escutcheon of the Baxter baronets of Kilmaron, and of Invereighty

- Sir George Washington Baxter, 1st Baronet (1853–1926)
