= Alcidion partitum =

Scientific classification
- Domain: Eukaryota
- Kingdom: Animalia
- Phylum: Arthropoda
- Class: Insecta
- Order: Coleoptera
- Suborder: Polyphaga
- Infraorder: Cucujiformia
- Family: Cerambycidae
- Genus: Alcidion
- Species: A. partitum

Binomial name
- Alcidion partitum (White, 1855)

Species of beetle

Alcidion partitum is a species of longhorn beetles of the subfamily Lamiinae. It was described by White in 1855, and is known from Brazil and French Guiana.
