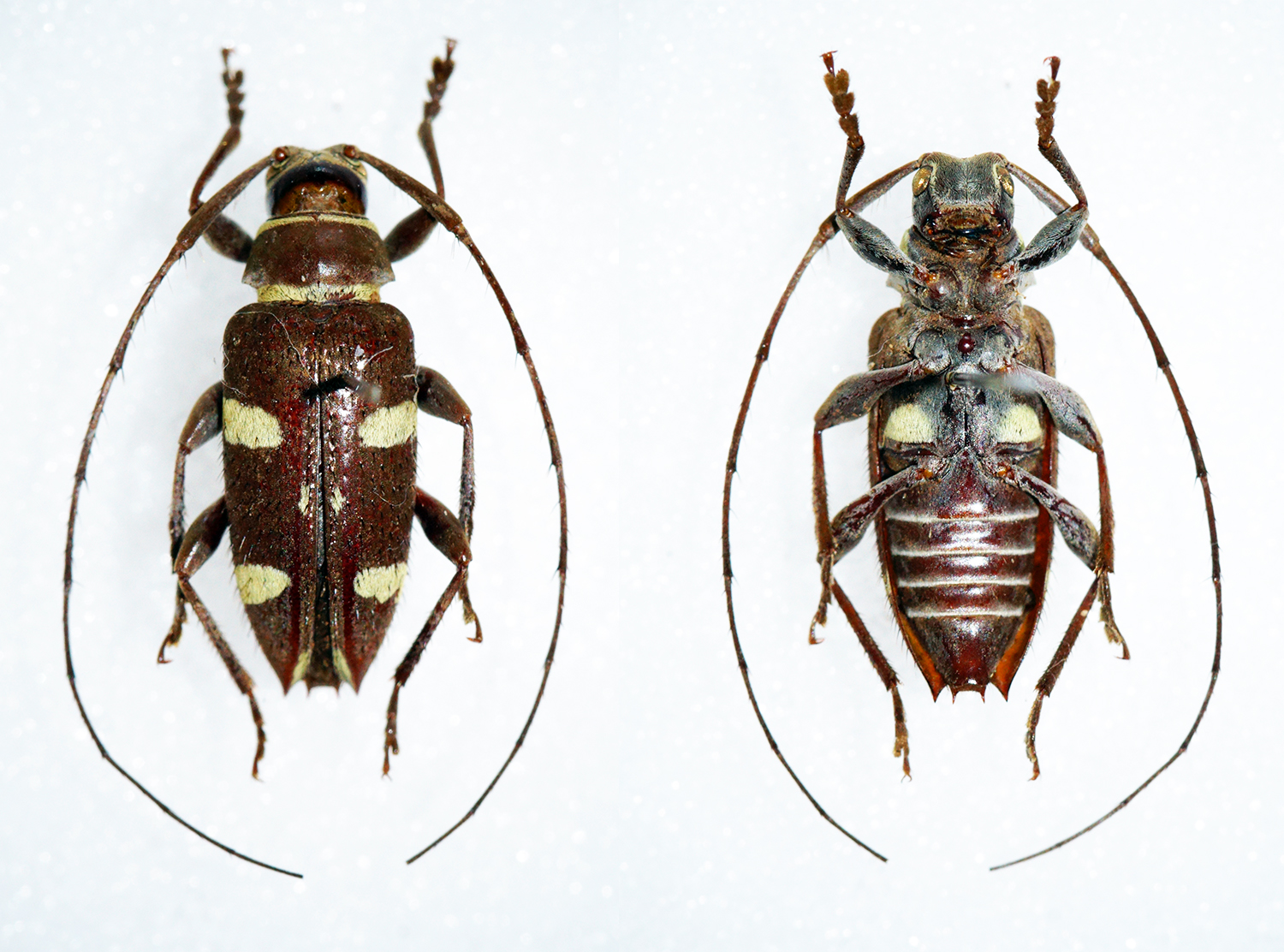

Scientific classification
- Kingdom: Animalia
- Phylum: Arthropoda
- Clade: Pancrustacea
- Class: Insecta
- Order: Coleoptera
- Suborder: Polyphaga
- Infraorder: Cucujiformia
- Family: Cerambycidae
- Genus: Alcidion
- Species: A. sulphurifer

Binomial name
- Alcidion sulphurifer (White, 1855)

= Alcidion sulphurifer =

Species of beetle

Alcidion sulphurifer is a species of longhorn beetles of the subfamily Lamiinae. It was described by White in 1855, and is known from Brazil, Peru, Ecuador, and Bolivia.
