= Alcidion ramulorum =

Scientific classification
- Domain: Eukaryota
- Kingdom: Animalia
- Phylum: Arthropoda
- Class: Insecta
- Order: Coleoptera
- Suborder: Polyphaga
- Infraorder: Cucujiformia
- Family: Cerambycidae
- Genus: Alcidion
- Species: A. ramulorum

Binomial name
- Alcidion ramulorum (Bates, 1864)

Species of beetle

Alcidion ramulorum is a species of longhorn beetles of the subfamily Lamiinae. It was described by Henry Walter Bates in 1864, and is known from Brazil.
