= Alcidion sannio =

Scientific classification
- Domain: Eukaryota
- Kingdom: Animalia
- Phylum: Arthropoda
- Class: Insecta
- Order: Coleoptera
- Suborder: Polyphaga
- Infraorder: Cucujiformia
- Family: Cerambycidae
- Genus: Alcidion
- Species: A. sannio

Binomial name
- Alcidion sannio Germar, 1824

Species of beetle

Alcidion sannio is a species of longhorn beetle of the subfamily Lamiinae. It was described by Ernst Friedrich Germar in 1824 and is known from Brazil.
