= Alcidion umbraticum =

Scientific classification
- Domain: Eukaryota
- Kingdom: Animalia
- Phylum: Arthropoda
- Class: Insecta
- Order: Coleoptera
- Suborder: Polyphaga
- Infraorder: Cucujiformia
- Family: Cerambycidae
- Genus: Alcidion
- Species: A. umbraticum

Binomial name
- Alcidion umbraticum (Jacquelin du Val in Sagra, 1857)

Species of beetle

Alcidion umbraticum is a species of longhorn beetles of the subfamily Lamiinae, and the only species in the genus Alcidion. It was described by Jacquelin du Val in 1857.
