= Alcidion humeralis =

Scientific classification
- Domain: Eukaryota
- Kingdom: Animalia
- Phylum: Arthropoda
- Class: Insecta
- Order: Coleoptera
- Suborder: Polyphaga
- Infraorder: Cucujiformia
- Family: Cerambycidae
- Genus: Alcidion
- Species: A. humeralis

Binomial name
- Alcidion humeralis (Perty, 1832)

Species of beetle

Alcidion humeralis is a species of longhorn beetles of the subfamily Lamiinae. It was described by Perty in 1832, and is found in Mexico, Panama, Samer, and Bolivia.
