= Alcidion aestimabilis =

Scientific classification
- Kingdom: Animalia
- Phylum: Arthropoda
- Class: Insecta
- Order: Coleoptera
- Suborder: Polyphaga
- Infraorder: Cucujiformia
- Family: Cerambycidae
- Genus: Alcidion
- Species: A. aestimabilis

Binomial name
- Alcidion aestimabilis (Melzer, 1934)

Species of beetle

Alcidion aestimabilis is a species of longhorn beetles of the subfamily Lamiinae. It was described by Melzer in 1934, and is known from Brazil.
