= Alcidion inornatum =

Scientific classification
- Domain: Eukaryota
- Kingdom: Animalia
- Phylum: Arthropoda
- Class: Insecta
- Order: Coleoptera
- Suborder: Polyphaga
- Infraorder: Cucujiformia
- Family: Cerambycidae
- Genus: Alcidion
- Species: A. inornatum

Binomial name
- Alcidion inornatum Monne & Monne, 2007

Species of beetle

Alcidion inornatum is a species of longhorn beetles of the subfamily Lamiinae. It was described by Monne and Monne in 2007, and is known from Colombia.
