= Alcidion unicolor =

Scientific classification
- Domain: Eukaryota
- Kingdom: Animalia
- Phylum: Arthropoda
- Class: Insecta
- Order: Coleoptera
- Suborder: Polyphaga
- Infraorder: Cucujiformia
- Family: Cerambycidae
- Genus: Alcidion
- Species: A. unicolor

Binomial name
- Alcidion unicolor (Fisher, 1932)

Species of beetle

Alcidion unicolor is a species of longhorn beetles of the subfamily Lamiinae. It was described by Fisher in 1932, and is known from Haiti.
