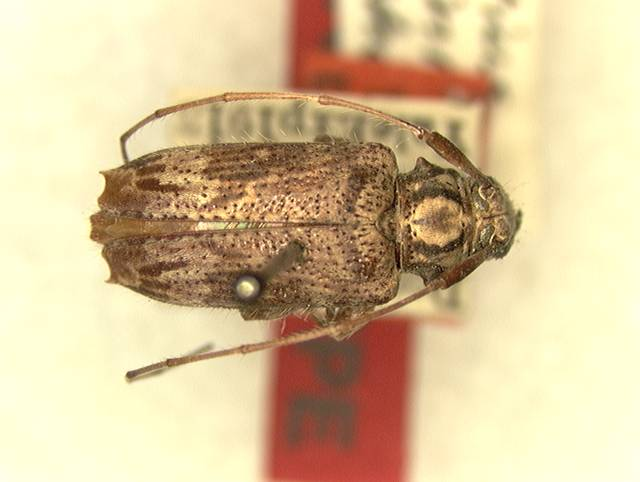

Scientific classification
- Domain: Eukaryota
- Kingdom: Animalia
- Phylum: Arthropoda
- Class: Insecta
- Order: Coleoptera
- Suborder: Polyphaga
- Infraorder: Cucujiformia
- Family: Cerambycidae
- Genus: Alcidion
- Species: A. dominicum

Binomial name
- Alcidion dominicum (Fisher, 1926)

= Alcidion dominicum =

Species of beetle

Alcidion dominicum is a species of longhorn beetles of the subfamily Lamiinae. It was described by Fisher in 1926, and is the holotype is from Dominica (see GBIF link below). A similar species occurs in the Dominican Republic and the species is therefore often wrongly cited to occur in the Dominican Republic too.
