= Alcidion quadriguttatum =

Scientific classification
- Domain: Eukaryota
- Kingdom: Animalia
- Phylum: Arthropoda
- Class: Insecta
- Order: Coleoptera
- Suborder: Polyphaga
- Infraorder: Cucujiformia
- Family: Cerambycidae
- Genus: Alcidion
- Species: A. quadriguttatum

Binomial name
- Alcidion quadriguttatum (Aurivillius, 1920)

Species of beetle

Alcidion quadriguttatum is a species of longhorn beetles of the subfamily Lamiinae. It was described by Per Olof Christopher Aurivillius in 1920 and is known from Brazil.
