= Alcidion alienum =

Scientific classification
- Kingdom: Animalia
- Phylum: Arthropoda
- Class: Insecta
- Order: Coleoptera
- Suborder: Polyphaga
- Infraorder: Cucujiformia
- Family: Cerambycidae
- Genus: Alcidion
- Species: A. alienum

Binomial name
- Alcidion alienum (Melzer, 1932)

Species of beetle

Alcidion alienum is a species of longhorn beetles of the subfamily Lamiinae. It was described by Melzer in 1932, and was discovered in Brazil.
