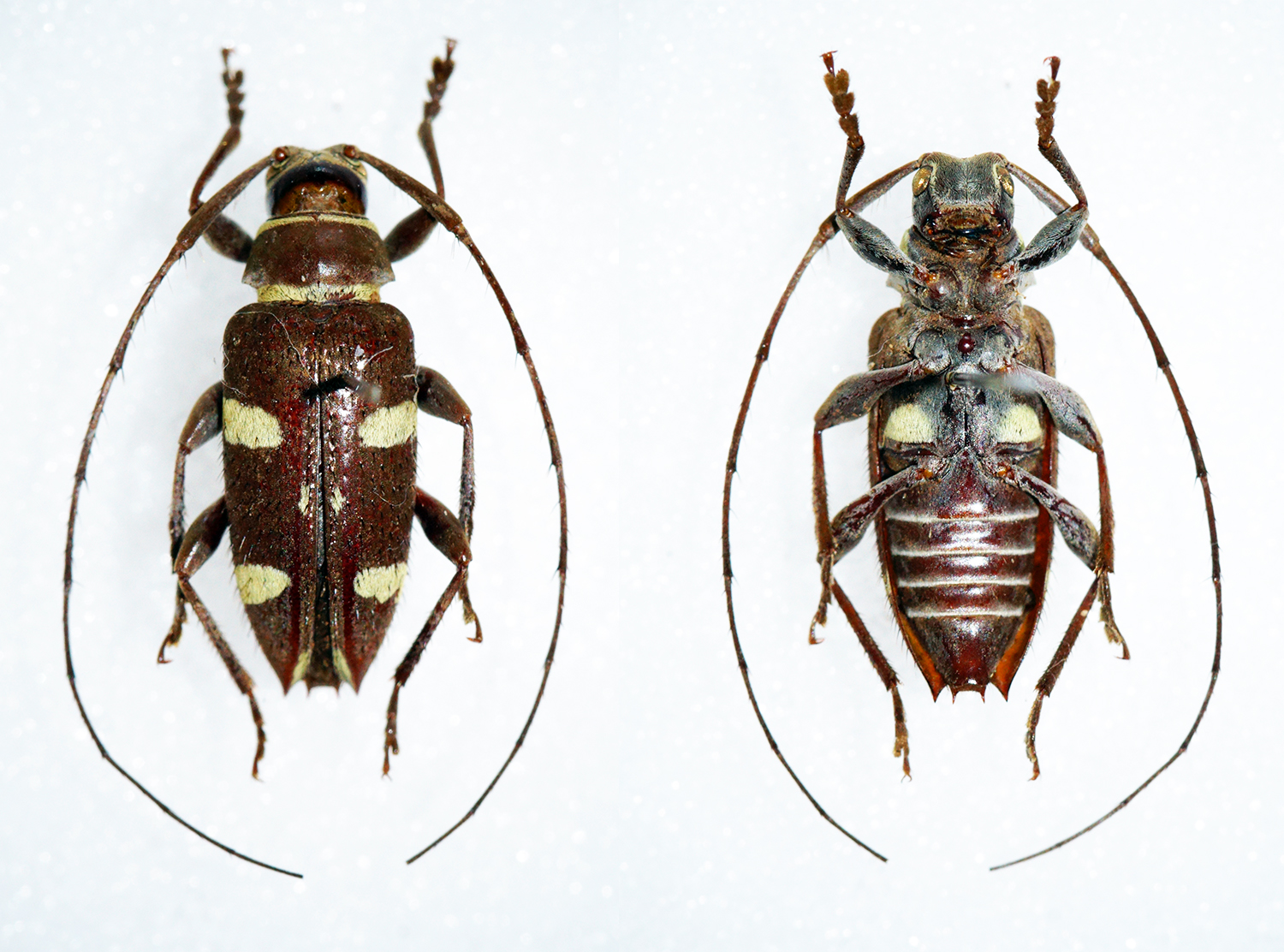
- Alcidion sulphurifer

Scientific classification
- Domain: Eukaryota
- Kingdom: Animalia
- Phylum: Arthropoda
- Class: Insecta
- Order: Coleoptera
- Suborder: Polyphaga
- Infraorder: Cucujiformia
- Family: Cerambycidae
- Tribe: Acanthocinini
- Genus: Alcidion

= Alcidion =

Genus of beetles

Alcidion is a genus of beetles in the family Cerambycidae, containing the following species:

- Alcidion aestimabilis (Melzer, 1934)
- Alcidion albosparsus (Melzer, 1934)
- Alcidion alienum (Melzer, 1932)
- Alcidion apicalis (Bates, 1864)
- Alcidion chryseis (Bates, 1864)
- Alcidion dominicum (Fisher, 1926)
- Alcidion humeralis (Perty, 1832)
- Alcidion inornatum Monne & Monne, 2007
- Alcidion ludicrum (Germar, 1824)
- Alcidion partitum (White, 1855)
- Alcidion quadriguttatum (Aurivillius, 1920)
- Alcidion ramulorum (Bates, 1864)
- Alcidion sannio (Germar, 1824)
- Alcidion sulphurifer (White, 1855)
- Alcidion umbraticum (Jacquelin du Val in Sagra, 1857)
- Alcidion unicolor (Fisher, 1932)
