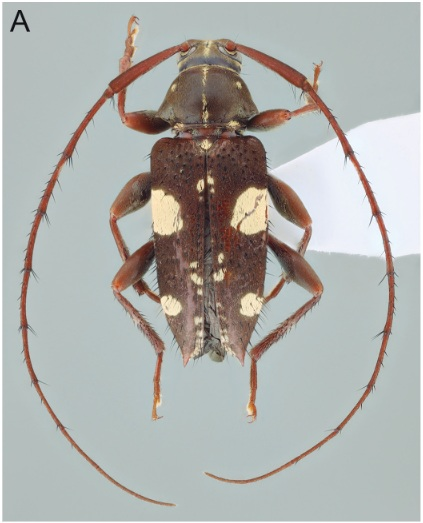

Scientific classification
- Kingdom: Animalia
- Phylum: Arthropoda
- Clade: Pancrustacea
- Class: Insecta
- Order: Coleoptera
- Suborder: Polyphaga
- Infraorder: Cucujiformia
- Family: Cerambycidae
- Genus: Alcidion
- Species: A. ludicrum

Binomial name
- Alcidion ludicrum (Germar, 1823)

Synonyms
- Lamia ludicra Germar, 1823

= Alcidion ludicrum =

Species of beetle

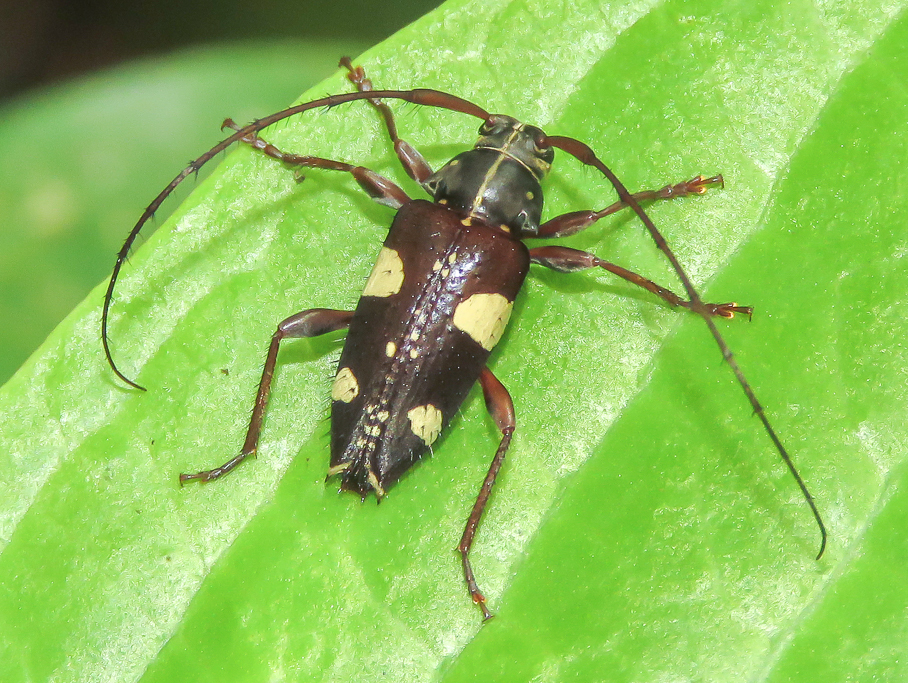
Alcidion ludicrum, Brazil

Alcidion ludicrum is a species of longhorn beetle of the subfamily Lamiinae. It was described by Ernst Friedrich Germar in 1824 and is known from Brazil, Paraguay, and Argentina.
