= George Smith =

George Smith may refer to:

== People ==
=== Business ===
- George Smith (architect) (1782–1869), southeast London architect
- George Girdler Smith (1795–1878), engraver in Boston, Massachusetts
- George Smith (publisher, born 1789) (1789–1846), Scottish-born publisher
- George Smith (financier) (1808–1899), Chicago financier
- George Samuel Fereday Smith (1812–1891), English industrialist
- George Smith (publisher, born 1824) (1824–1901), British publisher
- George Sutherland Smith (1830–1903), steamer captain and winemaker in Australia
- George Smith (philanthropist) (1831–1895), manager of the Whitwick Colliery Company Tileries, campaigner against industrial child labour
- George Alvin Smith (1844–1908), American businessman
- George Murray Smith the Younger (1859–1919), chairman of the Midland Railway, son of the publisher George Smith
- George Washington Smith (architect) (1876–1930), American architect
- George Albert Smith Jr. (1905–1969), professor at Harvard Business School
- George Bracewell Smith (1912–1976), London businessman and hotel owner

=== Entertainment and the arts ===
- George Smith (English artist) (1713/14–1776), English landscape painter and poet
- George Washington Smith (dancer) (c. 1820–1899), American ballet dancer
- George Barnett Smith (1841–1909), English journalist, biographer, poet
- George Albert Smith (filmmaker) (1864–1959), English filmmaker
- George Smith (Scottish artist) (1870–1934), painter of landscapes and horses
- George Gregory Smith (1865–1932), Scottish literary critic
- George O. Smith (1911–1981), science fiction author
- George H. Smith (fiction author) (1922–1996), science fiction author
- George "Harmonica" Smith (1924–1983), blues harmonica musician
- G. E. Smith (born 1952, George Edward Smith), American guitarist
- George Smith (singer), member of the British music band New Hope Club
- George Smith (Cumberland artist) (fl. 1860s), known as the Skiddaw Hermit

=== Law ===
- George Smith (executioner) (1805–1874), English executioner also known as Throttler Smith
- George W. Smith (judge) (1820s–1873), justice of the Supreme Court of Texas
- George Hugh Smith (1827–1901), Confederate Civil War veteran, Los Angeles lawyer and judge
- George Rose Smith (1911–1992), justice of the Arkansas Supreme Court
- George Curtis Smith (1935–2020), US federal judge
- George Bundy Smith (1937–2017), New York State Supreme Court justice
- George P. Smith II (born 1939), professor of law

=== Military ===
- George Smith (Royal Navy officer) (1797?–1850), British navy captain
- George Hugh Smith (1827–1901), Confederate Civil War veteran, Los Angeles lawyer and judge
- George Fairlamb Smith (1840–1877), American Union War Union Army colonel, politician and lawyer
- George R. Smith (Paymaster-General) (1850–1928), U.S. Army general
- George W. Smith (USMC) (1925–2014), major general in the U.S. Marine Corps
- George Edward Smith (born 1938), POW in Vietnam for two years, released in 1965
- George W. Smith Jr. (fl. 1985–2023), lieutenant general in the U.S. Marine Corps

=== Politics and civil service ===
==== United States ====
- George Smith (Missouri politician) (1809–1881), lieutenant governor of Missouri
- George Smith (Pennsylvania politician) (fl. 1809–1812), U.S. representative from Pennsylvania
- George F. Smith (fl. 1836–1838), early Wisconsin Territory legislator
- George Baldwin Smith (1823–1879), attorney general of Wisconsin, assemblyman, mayor of Madison
- George A. Smith (Michigan politician) (1825–1893)
- George C. Smith (Wisconsin politician) (fl. 1850s), Wisconsin farmer and legislator
- George C. Smith (Mississippi politician) (fl. 1870s
- George Fairlamb Smith (1840–1877), American Union War Union Army colonel, politician and lawyer from Pennsylvania
- George A. Smith (California politician) (1844–1916), member of the Los Angeles City Council
- George Edwin Smith (1849–1919), U.S. representative and senator of Massachusetts
- George J. Smith (1859–1913), US representative from New York
- George L. Smith (Georgia politician) (1912–1973), American politician in the state of Georgia
- George Luke Smith (1837–1884), US representative from Louisiana
- George M. Smith (1912–1962), lieutenant governor of Wisconsin
- George Ross Smith (1864–1952), U.S. representative from Minnesota, 1913–1917
- George Otis Smith (1871–1944), director of US Geological Survey, chairman of Federal Power Commission
- George S. Smith (1907–1986), mayor of Easton, Pennsylvania, 1960–1968
- George T. Smith (1916–2010), American Democratic Party politician and jurist from the state of Georgia
- George Washington Smith (congressman) (1846–1907), U.S. Representative from Illinois
- George Weissinger Smith (1864–1931), mayor of Louisville, Kentucky, 1917–1921
- George William Smith (politician) (1762–1811), governor of Virginia
- George Murrell Smith Jr. (born 1968), American Republican Party politician from South Carolina

==== United Kingdom ====
- George Smith (MP for Exeter) (died 1619), English MP for Exeter, 1604
- George Smith (died 1658) (1600s–1658), English lawyer and politician
- George Smith (1765–1836), British MP representing Midhurst
- George Robert Smith (MP) (1793–1869), English MP for Midhurst 1831–2 and Wycombe 1838–41
- George Smith (civil servant) (1858–1938), British civil servant and governor of Nyasaland

==== Australia ====
- George Paton Smith (1829–1877), Australian politician and attorney-general of Victoria
- George Ivan Smith (1915–1995), Australian U.N. representative to the Republic of Congo
- George Warwick Smith (1916–1999), Australian public servant

==== Canada ====
- George Smith (Nova Scotia politician) (died 1850), Nova Scotian representative
- George Byron Smith (1839–1917), Ontario representative and businessman
- George Smith (Ontario politician) (1852–1930), Scottish-born Ontario representative
- George Wilbert Smith (1855–1931), Alberta member of the Legislative Assembly
- George Robert Smith (Canadian politician) (1860–1922), Canadian politician
- George Joseph Smith (Canadian politician) (fl. 1926–1934), Ontario representative
- George P. Smith (politician) (1873–1942), politician and minister of the Crown from Alberta
- George Isaac Smith (1909–1982), premier of Nova Scotia

==== New Zealand ====
- George John Smith (1862–1946), Member of Parliament
- Harold Smith (New Zealand politician) (1866–1936), George Harold Smith

=== Religion ===
- George Smith (Scottish clergyman) (1748–1843), minister in Galston, East Ayrshire
- George Smith (historian) (1800–1868), British rail businessman, minister, religious historian
- George Smith (bishop of Victoria) (1815–1871), second principal of St. Paul's College, Hong Kong, 1849–1864
- George A. Smith (1817–1875), member of the Quorum of the Twelve Apostles
- George Smith (bishop of Argyll and the Isles) (1840–1918), Scottish Roman Catholic clergyman
- George Smith (chaplain) (1845–1918), missionary, army chaplain in South Africa, and defender of Rorke's Drift
- George Adam Smith (1856–1942), Scottish divine, author of reference work on geography of the Holy Land
- George Albert Smith (1870–1951), eighth president of The Church of Jesus Christ of Latter-day Saints
- George Smith (priest) (1877–1964), Archdeacon of Madras
- G. Carlos Smith (1910–1987), youth and missionary leader in The Church of Jesus Christ of Latter-day Saints
- Wayne Smith (bishop) (George Wayne Smith, born 1955), bishop of the Episcopal Diocese of Missouri

=== Science ===
- George Smith (mycologist) (1895–1967), British mycologist
- George E. Smith (1930–2025), co-inventor of the charge-coupled device, received Nobel Prize in Physics
- George D. W. Smith (born 1943), materials scientist, co-invented the atom probe tomograph
- George Davey Smith (born 1959), British epidemiologist
- George Smith (chemist) (born 1941), American biochemist, received Nobel Prize in Chemistry
- George Smith (surgeon) (1919–1994), Scots-born surgeon working in American universities

=== Sports ===
==== American football ====
- George Smith (center) (1914–1986), center in the NFL
- George Smith (American football coach) (born 1948), coach

==== Association football ====
- George Smith (footballer, born 1868) (1868–?), for Small Heath
- George Smith (footballer, born 1879) (1879–1908), for Preston North End, Aston Villa and Blackburn Rovers
- George Smith (footballer, born 1886) (1886–1978), for Southampton
- George Smith (footballer, born 1890) (1890–?), for Ilford, Genoa, and Alessandria
- George E. Smith (footballer) (fl. 1919–1921), English football outside forward for Brentford
- George W. Smith (footballer) (1898–1987), Scottish-born footballer for Chelsea
- George Smith (footballer, born May 1901) (1901–?), Scottish-born footballer for Notts County in the 1920s
- George Smith (footballer, born June 1901) (1901–?), fullback for Walsall and Torquay United in the 1920s
- George Smith (footballer, born 1902) (1902–?), player with Gillingham, Tranmere Rovers and Coventry City
- George Smith (footballer, born 1908) (1908–1986), halfback for Watford, Clapton Orient and Darlington in the 1930s
- George Smith (footballer, born 1910) (1910–?), Welsh footballer
- George Smith (soccer) (fl. c. 1930s), Australian footballer for Australia, St. George, Granville and Metters
- George Smith (footballer, born 1915) (1915–1983), for Brentford and Queens Park Rangers, manager of Portsmouth
- George Smith (footballer, died 1915) (?–1915), English footballer
- George Smith (footballer, born 1919) (1919–2001), fullback for Southampton, 1938 to 1949
- George Smith (footballer, born 1921) (1921–2013), forward for Manchester City and Chesterfield in 1940s and '50s
- George Smith (Scottish footballer) (born 1935), forward with Partick Thistle
- George Smith (footballer, born 1936), goalkeeper for Notts County and Hartlepool in 1950s and '60s
- George Smith (footballer, born 1945), for Barrow, Middlesbrough, and Swansea City
- George Smith (footballer, born 1996), English footballer
- George Smith (referee) (1943–2019), Scottish football referee

==== Baseball ====
- Germany Smith (George Smith, 1863–1927), shortstop
- Heinie Smith (1871–1939), second baseman and manager
- George Smith (National League pitcher) (1892–1965), pitcher
- George Smith (American League pitcher) (1901–1981), pitcher
- George Smith (sportsman) (1927–2011), also played basketball for the Harlem Globetrotters
- George Smith (second baseman) (1937–1987), second baseman

==== Cricket ====
- George Smith (groundskeeper) (died 1761), London Cricket Club, "keeper" of the Artillery Ground
- George Smith (cricketer, born 1785) (1785–1838), English cricketer
- George Smith (cricketer, born 1799) (1799–1839), English cricketer
- George Smith (cricketer, born 1844) (1844–1876), English cricketer
- George Smith (Australian cricketer) (1855–1897), Australian cricketer
- George Smith (cricketer, born 1876) (1876–1929), first class cricketer for Yorkshire CCC
- George Smith (cricketer, born 1906) (1906–1989), English cricketer
- George Smith (Jamaican cricketer) (born 1934), Jamaican cricketer

==== Other sports ====
- George William Smith (sportsman) (1874–1954), New Zealand track athlete, and rugby union and rugby league footballer
- George Smith (rugby league, born 1930) (1930–2014), Australian rugby league player
- George Smith (rugby union) (born 1980), Australian Wallabies flanker
- George Smith (athlete) (1876–1915), British tug of war competitor in the 1908 Summer Olympics
- George Smith (ice hockey) (1895–1949)
- George Smith (basketball) (died 1996), American college basketball coach
- George Smith (swimmer) (born 1949), Canadian swimmer

=== Other fields ===
- Sir George Smith, 1st Baronet (1787–1860), high sheriff of Nottingham
- Joe Coe (died 1891), also known as George Smith, African-American laborer who was lynched in 1891
- George H. Smith (died 1896), English immigrant and alleged murderer; see killing of George Smith
- George Smith (1833–1919), Scottish historian and geographer
- George Williamson Smith (1836–?), president of Trinity College, Hartford, Connecticut
- George Smith (Assyriologist) (1840–1876), English translator of the Epic of Gilgamesh
- G. C. Moore Smith (George Charles Moore Smith, 1858–1940), English literary scholar
- George E. Smith (gambler) (1862–1905), American gambler and thoroughbred owner
- George Wishart Smith (1868–before 1960), railway executive in Western Australia and Tasmania
- George Joseph Smith (1872–1915), British "Brides in the Bath" murderer
- George McCall Smith (1882–1958), Scottish doctor, medical superintendent and community leader in New Zealand
- George Toogood Smith (1903–1955), uncle of John Lennon and husband of Mimi Smith
- George Smith (trade unionist) (1914–1978), general secretary of UCATT
- George H. Smith (1949–2022), American libertarian and atheist author
- George Allen Smith (1979–2005), passenger missing from the cruise ship MS Brilliance of the Seas

== Others ==
- George Smith (Hollyoaks), a character on British soap opera Hollyoaks
- George Smith (horse) (1913–?), American thoroughbred racehorse, 1916 Kentucky Derby winner

== See also ==
- George Delacourt-Smith, Baron Delacourt-Smith (1917–1972), British politician
- George Logie-Smith (1914–2007), Australian orchestra and choral conductor
- George Albert Smith (disambiguation)
- George E. Smith (disambiguation)
- George Smyth (disambiguation)
- George Smythe (disambiguation)
- Smith (surname), originating in England
- George P. Smith (disambiguation)
- George W. Smith (disambiguation)
- George Smith v. William Turner, an 1849, U.S. Supreme Court case
- List of people with surname Smith
