= Gregory Smith =

Gregory or Greg Smith may refer to:

== Sportspeople ==
=== Baseball ===
- Greg Smith (infielder) (born 1967), former infielder with the Chicago Cubs and Los Angeles Dodgers
- Greg Smith (pitcher) (born 1983), pitcher for the Philadelphia Phillies

=== Basketball ===
- Greg Smith (basketball, born 1947), former NBA player
- Greg Smith (basketball, born 1991), American professional basketball player

=== Cricket ===
- Greg Smith (cricketer, born 1971), Nottinghamshire cricketer
- Greg Smith (cricketer, born 1983), Essex cricketer
- Greg Smith (cricketer, born 1988), Nottinghamshire cricketer
- Gregory Smith (cricketer) (born 1986), Caymanian cricketer

=== Rugby ===
- Greg Smith (rugby union coach) (c. 1949–2002), Australian national rugby coach
- Greg Smith (rugby league) (born 1973), Newcastle Knights rugby league player
- Greg Smith (rugby union, born 1968), Fijian former rugby union player
- Greg Smith (rugby union, born 1974), Fijian rugby union footballer

=== Other sports ===
- Gregory Smith (canoeist) (born 1956), former Canadian sprint canoer
- Greg Smith (ice hockey) (born 1955), former National Hockey League player, with the Washington Capitals
- Greg Smith (American football, born 1959), former National Football League defensive lineman (1984)
- Greg Smith (American football, born 1970), walk-on to the Ohio State football team in 1988
- Greg Smith (Australian footballer) (born 1957), VFL and SANFL player
- Gregory Smith (wrestler) (born 1986), American professional wrestler
- Greg Smith (Paralympian) (born 1967), Australian Paralympian athlete and wheelchair rugby player
- Greg Smith (curler) (born 1996), Canadian curler

== Entertainers ==
- Gregory Smith (actor) (born 1983), American-Canadian actor
- Greg Smith (American musician) (born 1963), bassist and vocalist
- Greg Smith (Canadian musician), Canadian musician

== Politicians ==
=== Australia ===
- Greg Smith (New South Wales politician) (born 1947), Australian Liberal politician; Attorney-General of New South Wales
- Greg Smith (Western Australian politician) (born 1960), former Australian Liberal politician

=== United Kingdom ===
- Greg Smith (British politician) (born 1979), former deputy leader of Hammersmith & Fulham Council and Conservative MP for Buckingham constituency

=== United States ===
- Greg Smith (Kansas politician) (born 1959), Republican member of the Kansas Senate
- Greg Smith (Nevada politician) (born 1955), Democrat member of the Nevada Assembly
- Gregory Smith (New Hampshire politician), Republican member of the New Hampshire State House
- Greg Smith (Oregon politician) (born 1968), American politician in the U.S. state of Oregon
- J. Gregory Smith (1818–1891), railroad tycoon, politician, war-time governor of Vermont

== Other people ==
- Greg Smith, CFO of The Boeing Company
- Greg Smith (artist) (born 1976), American artist
- Greg Smith (British Army officer) (born 1956), British businessman and Territorial Army officer
- Greg Smith (film producer) (1939–2009), British film producer of the 'Confessions' series
- Greg Parma Smith (born 1983), New York-based painter
- Greg "Tarzan" Smith, a contestant on Survivor: One World
- Gregory Blake Smith (born 1951), American novelist and short story writer
- Gregory White Smith (1951–2014), American biographer

== See also ==
- Greg Smyth (1966–2018), Canadian ice hockey player
