= George W. Smith =

George W. Smith may refer to:

- George W. Smith (judge) (1820s–1873), justice of the Supreme Court of Texas
- George W. Smith (USMC) (1925–2014), major general in the U.S. Marine Corps
- George W. Smith Jr., lieutenant general in the U.S. Marine Corps
- George W. Smith (footballer), Scottish-born footballer for Chelsea in the 1920s and 1930s
- George Warwick Smith (1916–1999), Australian public servant
- George Washington Smith (architect) (1876–1930), American architect
- George Washington Smith (congressman) (1846–1907), U.S. representative from Illinois
- George Washington Smith (dancer), American ballet dancer.
- George Wayne Smith (born 1955), bishop of the Episcopal Diocese of Missouri
- George Weissinger Smith (1864–1931), mayor of Louisville, Kentucky, 1917–1921
- George Wilbert Smith (1855–1931), Alberta member of the Legislative Assembly
- George William Smith (politician) (1762–1811), governor of Virginia
- George William Smith (sportsman) (1874–1954), New Zealand track athlete, and rugby union and rugby league footballer

== See also ==
- George Smith (disambiguation)
