= George E. Smith (disambiguation) =

George E. Smith (1930–2025) was an American scientist, applied physicist and Nobel Prize winner.

George E. Smith may also refer to:

- George E. Smith (footballer), English footballer
- George E. Smith (gambler), American gambler and horse racing enthusiast
- George Edwin Smith (1849–1919), Massachusetts lawyer, legal writer, and politician
- George E. Smith (philosopher) (1938–2024), American philosopher of science and turbomachinery engineer
- George Edward Smith (born 1940), POW in Vietnam for two years, released in 1965
- George Smith (sportsman), baseball and basketball player
- G. E. Smith (George Edward Smith), American guitarist

== See also ==
- George Smith (disambiguation)
