= Change of venue =

Move of a trial to a new location

A change of venue is the legal term for moving a trial to a new location. In high-profile matters, a change of venue may occur to move a jury trial away from a location where a fair and impartial jury may not be possible due to widespread publicity about a crime and its defendants to another community in order to obtain jurors who can be more objective in their duties. This change may be to different towns, and across the other sides of states or, in some extremely high-profile federal cases, to other states.

In law, the word venue designates the location where a trial will be held. It derives from the Latin word for "a place where people gather."

Notwithstanding its use in high-profile cases, a change of venue is more typically sought when a defendant believes that the plaintiff's selected venue is either improper or less appropriate than another venue. A change of venue request because venue is improper means that the removing defendant believes that the case may not be in that venue because it is improper under procedural rules. A change of venue request can also be made if the defendant believes there is a more appropriate venue – called forum non conveniens – even if the current venue is proper under the procedural rules. In these cases, the trial judge is given great deference in most jurisdictions by appellate courts in making the decision as to whether there is a more appropriate venue.

A change of venue may be reflected in the formal language used in a trial. For example, in California, when a bailiff or marshal calls the court to order part of the cry will take the form "in and for the County of San Francisco"; when there is a change of venue the cry will be, "in the County of Alameda for the County of San Francisco."

In England and Wales, the Central Criminal Court Act 1856 permitted the venue for some high-profile cases to be changed to the Old Bailey in London. The Act was passed during the case of William Palmer and was based concerns that he would not be able get a fair trial in his native Staffordshire. They would make it easy for him to repeal the case by local publicity surrounding the case.

== Notable examples of changes of venue ==
- The sensational 1844 trial of Polly Bodine, who was accused of murdering her husband's sister and niece and setting fire to their house, a case commented on by Edgar Allan Poe and P. T. Barnum, among others, was held on Staten Island in New York. The packed trial resulted in a hung jury and then an early case of change of venue, the retrial moved first to Manhattan, which resulted in a conviction, later overturned, and then to Newburgh, New York, where Bodine was acquitted.
- The 1930s trial of the three Plaid Cymru defendants charged with arson of an RAF bombing school in Penyberth was controversially moved to the Old Bailey as the local population in Penyberth were highly sympathetic towards the defendants.
- The 1992 state level trial of the four Los Angeles police officers (LAPD) in the Rodney King incident; this trial was moved outside Los Angeles County to Simi Valley in neighboring Ventura County.
- The 1995 double murder criminal trial of O.J. Simpson for the 1994 murders of Nicole Brown Simpson and Ronald Goldman, in which the court granted a change of venue, and ordered the case to be moved from Santa Monica to downtown Los Angeles.
- The trial of 1995 Oklahoma City bomber Timothy McVeigh, in which the court granted a change of venue, and ordered the case transferred from Oklahoma to the U.S. District Court in Denver, Colorado presided over by U.S. District Judge Richard Matsch.
- In 1996, the murder trial for Bernie Tiede had its venue changed from Carthage, Texas on the concern that the defendant was so popular in that community that a jury there would be unavoidably and unfairly biased in his favor.
- The Amadou Diallo murder case in 1999, in which the NYPD defendants' trial was moved to Albany.
- The 2002 cases of Beltway snipers Lee Boyd Malvo and John Allen Muhammad, whose publicized crimes in northern Virginia caused their trials to be moved over 100 miles away to the southeastern Virginia cities of Chesapeake and Virginia Beach.
- The 2004 trial of Scott Peterson was moved from Stanislaus County to San Mateo County amid concerns that Peterson would not be able to receive a fair trial due to the heavy amount of publicity the trial had generated.
- While the 2006 trial of Perry March in the murder of his wife ten years earlier was held in Nashville, where the crime had occurred, the defense won a motion to have the jury selected from the pool in Chattanooga. The jurors were bused to Nashville and housed in a hotel for the duration of the trial, like the 1980 busing of jurors in John Wayne Gacy's murder trial in Illinois where its jurors were bused from Rockford to Cook County.
- The trial of Christian Bahena Rivera (the murder suspect of Mollie Tibbetts) was moved from Poweshiek County to Woodbury County in 2019 due to the latter having a greater amount of Spanish-speaking jurors.
