= George C. Smith =

George C. Smith may refer to:

- George Curtis Smith (1935-2020), Ohio federal judge
- George C. Smith (Mississippi politician), fl. 1870s
- George C. Smith (Wisconsin politician), fl. 1850s

== See also ==
- George Smith (disambiguation)
