= George Albert Smith (disambiguation) =

George Albert Smith (1870–1951) was the eighth president of The Church of Jesus Christ of Latter-day Saints (LDS Church).

George Albert Smith may also refer to:

- George A. Smith (1817–1875), American leader in the Latter Day Saint movement and the LDS Church
- George Albert Smith (filmmaker) (1864–1959), English hypnotist, astronomer and cinema technology pioneer
- George Albert Smith Jr. (1905–1969), American professor at Harvard Business School

== See also ==
- Albert Smith (disambiguation)
- George Albert (disambiguation)
- George Smith (disambiguation)
