= Castration of Popish Ecclesiastics =

Anti-Catholic pamphlet (1700)

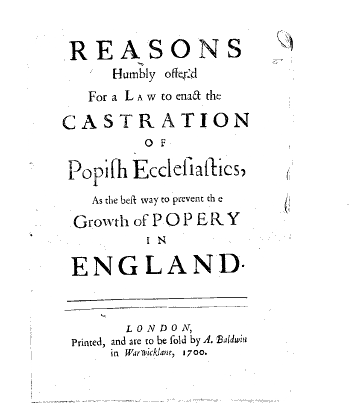
Title page of the first printing (London: A. Baldwin, 1700)

Reasons humbly offer'd for a Law to enact the Castration of Popish Ecclesiastic[k]s is an anonymous anti-Catholic quarto pamphlet published in London in 1700. The work has been disputedly attributed to Daniel Defoe.

The book accuses the Roman Catholic priests of practicing infanticide and sexual immorality. Concluding that the priests are more lecherous than ordinary men, the author suggests their punishment by enforced castration. Besides its anti-clericalism, the book also advocates for an alliance of the European Protestants against the Catholic France of Louis XIV.

== Context ==
The work is ostensibly very offensive in tone, but G. C. Moore Smith thinks it might be an ironic satire in the manner of Defoe's The Shortest Way with the Dissenters, which promoted increased hostility towards another religious minority in England. The author's broader purpose in this pamphlet was to advocate for a Protestant alliance in Europe against Louis XIV's France.

== Summary ==
As evidence of the wickedness of the Roman Catholic priests the author cites the authority of Foxe's Acts and Monuments for accusations of infanticide and sexual immorality. He holds that the celibacy of the priests was ordained by the "Romish Church" in order that they might have a firmer hold upon the women, and he adduces five main arguments in support of his assertion. He argues that enforced chastity has made the priests more lecherous than ordinary men, and that enforced castration may be the only cure to their immense sexual appetite. To the crimes with which the priests are charged is added, in conclusion, the following accusation:

They not only corrupt the Morals of People themselves by such Practices and Principles as above mention'd, but bring over and encourage others to do it; particularly those Italians, &c. who sell and print Aretin's Postures; and in order to debauch the Minds of Women, and to make them guilty of unnatural Crims [sic] invent and sell 'em such things as Modesty forbids to name.

== Editions ==
The work was reprinted in Dublin as Reasons humbly offer'd to both houses of parliament, for a new Law to enact the castration or gelding of popish ecclesiastics, in this kingdom ... As the best way to prevent the growth of popery (Dublin, 1710; price 3d; 4to. 16 pp.)

In the 19th century this pamphlet was reprinted by the Protestant Evangelical Mission and Electoral Union in a tract of 32 pages, to which was added an Appendix containing the three following pieces:

1. An account, extracted from The Times of 16 May 1860, of the trial, at Turin, in that year, of the Carmelite priest, Gurlino, who was condemned to seven years solitary confinement for having had sexual relations with a number of virgins. 33 girls gave evidence against him. The relations of a young girl found in her possession an obscene print, and insisted on her telling them from whom she had procured it. The girl refused for some time, but eventually named her confessor. She added that several of her friends had also received from Don Gurlino immoral books and prints and had been seduced by him.
2. A Pastoral Address by the Bishop of London. Published A.D. 1751.
3. Facts connected with the Arrest of William Murphy at Bolton, Lancashire, July 14, 1868.

== Sources ==
- Fenning, Hugh (1998). "Dublin Imprints of Catholic Interest: 1701–1739". Collectanea Hibernica (39/40): 117. JSTOR 30004667.
- Moore Smith, George Charles (1929). "An Unrecognized Work of Defoe's?". The Review of English Studies. 5 (17): 64–6. JSTOR 508868.
- Peakman, Julie (2003). "Anti-Catholic Erotica". Mighty Lewd Books. London: Palgrave Macmillan. pp. 22, 134–5. doi:10.1057/9780230512573_7. ISBN 9781349512041.
- "Reasons humbly offer'd for a law to enact the castration of popish ecclesiastics, as the best way to prevent the growth of popery in England [microform]". National Library of Australia.
- Reasons humbly offer'd for a law to enact the castration, or gelding, of Popish ecclesiastics. printed, and are to be sold by A. Baldwin. 1700 – via National Library of Ireland.
