= Georg Albrecht =

Georg or George Albrecht may refer to:

- Georg Albrecht (mayor) (1603–1666), German politician, mayor of Rothenburg ob der Tauber
- George Alexander Albrecht (businessman) (1834–1898), German cotton merchant and philanthropist
- George Alexander Albrecht (1935–2021), German conductor and composer, great-grandson of the above

== See also ==
- George Albert (disambiguation)
