= A. C. Smith =

A. C. Smith may refer to:

- Albert C. Smith (disambiguation), several individuals:
  - Albert C. Smith (United States Army officer) (1894–1974), officer in the US Army
  - Albert Charles Smith (1906–1999), American botanist
- Alan Smith (cricketer) (born 1936), English former Test cricketer
- A. C. Smith & Co. Gas Station, a historic gas station in Quincy, Massachusetts
- Sir Arthur Conan Doyle, who played football as a goalkeeper under the pseudonym 'A.C. Smith'

== See also ==
- C. A. Smith (born 1895), British politician
- A. C. H. Smith (born 1935 as A. C. Smith), British novelist and playwright
