= Albert C. Smith =

Albert C. Smith may refer to:

- Albert Charles Smith (1906–1999), American botanist
- Albert C. Smith (general) (1894–1974), officer in the United States Army

== See also ==
- Albert Smith (disambiguation)
- A. C. Smith (disambiguation)
