= Sonny Smith (disambiguation) =

Sonny Smith (born 1936) is an American college basketball coach.

Sonny Smith may refer to:

- George Smith (sportsman) (nicknamed "Sonny Smith"; 1927–2011), American baseball and basketball player
- Sonny Smith (musician) (born 1972), American musician and playwright
