= HM Prison Stafford =

Men's prison in Stafford, England

HMP Stafford
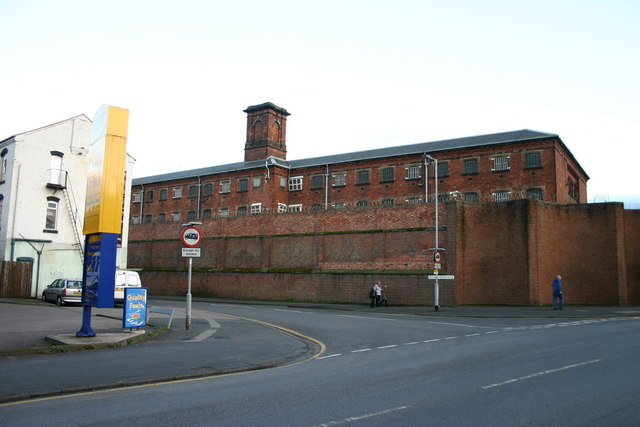
- Interactive map of HMP Stafford
- Location: Stafford, Staffordshire; 52°48′42″N 2°07′04″W
- Security class: Adult Male/Category C
- Population: 741 (May 2009)
- Opened: 1793
- Managed by: HM Prison Services
- Governor: Theresa Wright (Acting)
- Website: Stafford at justice.gov.uk

HM Prison Stafford is a Category C men's prison, in Stafford, Staffordshire, England. The prison is operated by His Majesty's Prison Service. In 2014 it became a sex offender-only jail.

== History ==
His Majesty's Prison at Stafford was originally constructed and opened as the Staffordshire County Gaol ("New Staffordshire Gaol") in 1793 having been constructed under the Stafford Gaol Act 1787 (27 Geo. 3. c. 60).

It was substantially enlarged by a building development programme of works in the 19th century. HMP Stafford became a sex offender-only prison in 2014.

== Early history ==
In 1812, forger William Booth was publicly executed outside the jail. A badly-tied rope allowed him to fall to the floor, unharmed. He was hanged a second time, fatally, later that day.

Among its early prisoners was George Smith, who served several sentences for theft in the facility and began his later work as a hangman while still a prisoner, assisting William Calcraft. He officiated at several executions in the prison later in his life, including that of the convicted poisoner William Palmer in 1866.

== Aftermath of the 1916 Easter Rising ==
HMP Stafford was used to incarcerate prisoners from the defeated Easter Rising in April 1916.

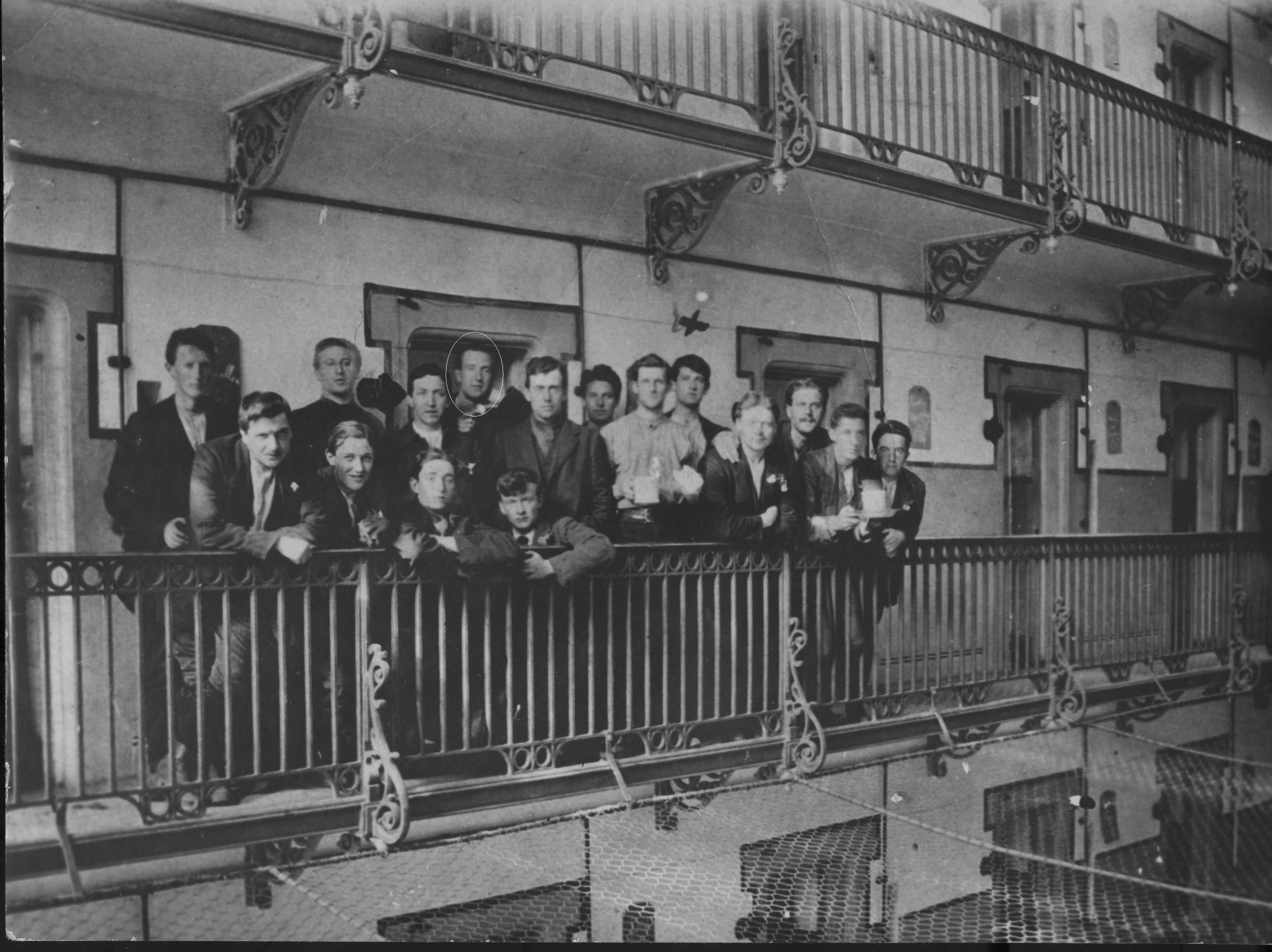
Captured Irish soldiers in Stafford Gaol after the failed Easter Rising. Michael Collins is fifth from the right with an 'x' over his head.

A number of the Republican prisoners later left accounts of their time in Stafford,

I forgot to mention that in Stafford prison, besides the two buildings I've mentioned there was another building, I forget its name, in which British conscientious objectors were placed. The term conscientious objector may not now be understood. It was applied to those who for religious or other reasons had an objection to fighting or the taking of human life. Compulsory military service or conscription had been introduced into Great Britain, and when these people were called up they refused to come. They were then arrested, charged and sentenced. They were subjected to all sorts of cruelties and indignities.

— James Kavanagh

== Closure ==
The facility was closed in late 1916 and mothballed for two decades, re-opening on the commencement of World War II in 1939.

== Security concerns in the 1990s ==
In November 1998, an inspection report from Her Majesty's Chief Inspector of Prisons heavily criticised security at HMP Stafford after it emerged that prisoners were smuggling in illegal drugs for consumption within the facility. Inmates were fashioning strips of paper into planes, then attaching lines to them and flying them over the 19-foot (5.8-metre) perimeter wall. The lines were then used to pull packages containing prohibited substances back over the wall. The facility was also criticised for being overcrowded, under-resourced, and failing to adequately prepare prisoners for release.

== 2003 reports ==
In March 2003, the Prison Reform Trust singled out Stafford Prison for concern over the high turnover rate in its governor's post. The trust noted that HMP Stafford had employed four different governors in only five years, and that such unstable leadership would not be tolerated in schools or hospitals. The trust also highlighted prison officers' absenteeism through sickness leave being an issue of concern.

In October 2003 a further report from the Chief Inspector praised improvements at Stafford Prison. HMP Stafford was labelled as becoming an effective training prison specialising in helping vulnerable prisoners and sex offenders. Considerable advance had also been made in reducing the supply of narcotics into the prison, and in addressing drug addiction treatment. However, the report also highlighted concerns over poor exercise facilities for prisoners, and whether foreign prisoners had enough access to specialised help.

== Security enhancement works ==
In October 2003 a new entrance gateway system came into operation at Stafford to upgrade the facility's security.

== The prison today ==
HM Prison Stafford is classed as a Category 'C' Prison facility for male adults. In April 2014 it became a sex-offenders-only prison. Accommodation at the prison consists mainly of double-occupancy cells, except in the G Wing which is used for single occupancy.

== Notable former inmates ==
- Ashley Blake (born 1969), television presenter
- William Booth (1776–1812), forger.
- Michael Collins (1890–1922), Irish revolutionary prisoner of war, held in the facility in 1916.
- Rolf Harris (1930–2023), artist and televisual entertainer
- William Palmer (1824–1856), physician and convicted murderer, executed and buried at HM Prison Stafford.
- George Smith (1805–1874), penal executioner, known as Throttler Smith

== See also ==
- Listed buildings in Stafford (Outer Area)
