= George Smythe =

George Smythe may refer to:

- George Smythe, 7th Viscount Strangford (1818–1857), British politician
- George Chichester Smythe (1843–1902), Irish Anglican priest
- George W. Smythe (1899–1969), American general in the Battle of Jackson Heights

== See also ==
- George Smyth (disambiguation)
