= William Murphy (activist) =

Irish anti-Catholic public lecturer

William Murphy (1 August 1834 – 12 March 1872) was an Irish Protestant lecturer and anti-Catholic demagogue. The "Murphy Riots" in Birmingham (1867) and Ashton-under-Lyne (1868) are associated with him.

Murphy was born at Castletown Conyers, Co. Limerick, eldest son of a Roman Catholic headmaster of the local national school. When he was a child his father converted to protestantism, and when this was revealed the family moved to Co. Mayo. Educated at a scripture college at Ballinasloe, Co. Galway, William became a reader for the evangelical Irish Society in 1852. Moving to Dublin in 1856, he worked for the Irish Church Missions.

In 1862 he emigrated to England, where he offered his services as an evangelist. Robert Steele, secretary of the small Protestant Electoral Union (later the Protestant Evangelical Mission and Electoral Union), launched him on his career as an anti-Catholic lecturer in the country. Murphy was involved in distributing "The Confessional Unmasked: shewing the depravity of the Romish priesthood, the iniquity of the Confessional, and the questions put to females in confession", a sensationalist pamphlet which included salacious details of Catholics' sexual practices. Violence accompanied his rallies: he caused a riot at Plymouth, and was arrested at Bath for obstructing a Catholic procession.

He first came to national prominence as ‘the lecturer against Romanism’ in Birmingham in June 1867. The mayor of the city prevented him from speaking in the town hall, but his supporters erected a platform and the meeting took place on 16 June. Irish labourers, furious at Murphy's provocative comments, stormed the area and there were riots in the city centre. The police had to clear Carrs Lane with cutlasses and Park Street was nearly demolished. The next day Murphy portrayed himself as the defender of free speech, and his behaviour posed a serious challenge to the liberal opinions of the time. That night his supporters marched through the Irish district of Birmingham, breaking into houses and damaging the Roman Catholic church. Now a notorious demagogue, he toured the country attacking the practice of confession, which he insisted was an excuse for priests to question women about their sexual habits.

In 1867, Murphy arrived in Stalybridge to speak. He stirred up Protestant communities against their Catholic neighbours - who were predominantly Irish - by suggesting that they were they were profiting in the economic recession caused by the Lancashire Cotton Famine by offering cheap labour and therefore taking local jobs. A Church of England rector from Dukinfield who attended his speech recorded that Murphy had called for the hanging of local priests. As a result, attendees left the meeting to riot and smash windows in the Irish quarter of the town - an action that required severe reaction from the local constabulary who brought out the cutlasses. The parish priest of St Peter's, the Rev. Joseph Daley, took to the roof of his church to defend it and in the commotion, Reuben Beeley was shot. The priest was acquitted.

A riot at Ashton-under-Lyne in May 1868, where a man, Darby Dempsey, was killed, two Catholic chapels attacked, and one hundred shops and houses ransacked, was blamed on Murphy although he was not present at the time; Murphy insisted the Fenians were culpable. Hugh Mason read the mob the riot act.

The questions of freedom of speech in general and Murphy in particular were debated in the House of Commons. In the 1868 election he threatened to stand as an independent candidate for Manchester, but eventually decided against.

Murphy decided on a series of lectures against catholicism at the Oddfellows Hall, Whitehaven, Cumberland, in April 1871. On 20 April a group of Irish miners stormed the lecture hall and beat him unconscious. His health never recovered from the assault and he died 12 March 1872 at his home at Providence Place, Birmingham. He is buried in Key Hill Cemetery.

== See also ==
- Anti-Catholicism in the United Kingdom
- Castration of Popish Ecclesiastics

== Sources ==
- Geoghegan, Patrick M. (2009). "Murphy, William". Dictionary of Irish Biography (online ed.). Cambridge University Press; Royal Irish Academy.
- Kidd, Alan (2008) [1993]. Manchester. Keele: Keele University Press. ISBN 978-1-85936-128-3.
- Nevell, Mike (1994). The People Who Made Tameside. Tameside Metropolitan Borough Council. ISBN 1-871324-12-2.
