= Gurlino (priest) =

Father Don Gurlino
- Religion: Roman Catholic

Don Gurlino was a 19th-century Carmelite priest, active in Turin, who was scandalously convicted in 1860 of having seduced and had sexual relations with a number of girls to whom he acted as confessor; he was sentenced to seven years solitary confinement.

== Case ==
In 1860, Gurlino was condemned by the Criminal Court of Turin to seven years solitary confinement for having had sexual relations with a number of virgins. 33 girls gave evidence against him. The relations of a young girl had found in her possession an obscene print, and insisted on her telling them from whom she had procured it. The girl refused for some time, but eventually named her confessor. She added that several of her friends had also received from Don Gurlino immoral books and prints and had been seduced by him.

== Legacy ==
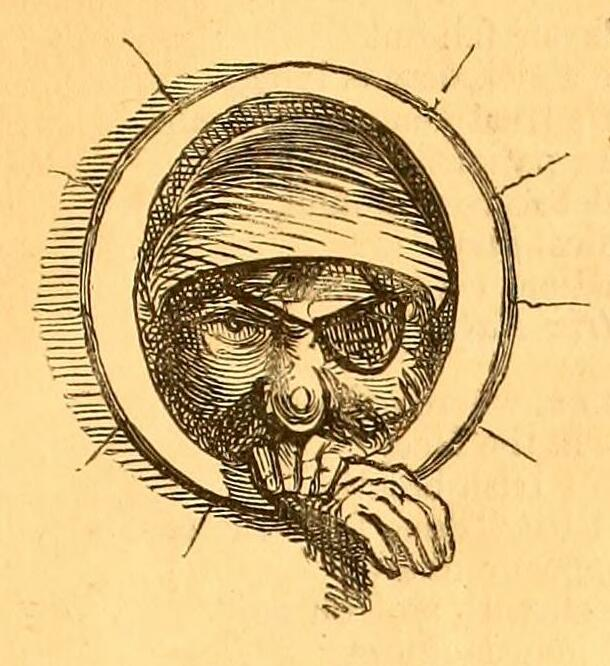
Caricature in Punch, 26 May 1860

The case was exploited by anti-Catholic elements of the British press and the lurid coverage was indicative of wider religious and sexual anxieties in Victorian Britain, especially concern for female virginity and distrust of the confessional.

== See also ==
- Castration of Popish Ecclesiastics
- Madonna del Carmine, Turin
- San Carlo Borromeo, Turin

== Sources ==
- Peschier, Diana (2009). "8. Religious Sexual Perversion in Nineteenth-Century Anti-Catholic Literature". In Peakman, Julie (ed.). Sexual Perversions, 1670–1890. London: Palgrave Macmillan. pp. 216–18. doi:10.1057/9780230244689_8. ISBN 978-1-349-36397-1.
- "The Confessional". The Times. 16 May 1860. p. 10.
