= George Smyth =

George Smyth may refer to:

- George W. Smyth (1803–1866), Texas politician
- George Smyth (lawyer) (1705–1772), Irish lawyer and politician
- George Smyth (Canadian politician) (1864–1938), Ontario farmer and political figure
- George Stracey Smyth (1767–1823), Canadian politician
- Sir George Smyth, 6th Baronet (1784–1852), British Member of Parliament for Colchester
- George Smyth (physician) (c. 1629–1702), Original Fellow of the Royal Society, on List of Fellows of the Royal Society elected in 1663
- George W. Smyth (Mississippi judge) (died 1832), a justice of the Supreme Court of Mississippi

== See also ==
- George Smith (disambiguation)
- George Smythe (disambiguation)
