= Albert Smith =

Albert Smith may refer to:

== Entertainment ==
- Albert Richard Smith (1816–1860), English author and entertainer
- Albert E. Smith (producer) (1875–1958), English stage magician, film director, and producer
- Albert J. Smith (actor) (1894–1939), American actor

== Politics ==
- Albert Smith (Maine politician) (1793–1867), member of U.S. House of Representatives from Maine
- Albert Smith (New York politician) (1805–1870), member of U.S. House of Representatives from New York
- Albert E. Smith (Wisconsin politician) (1839–?), Wisconsin state assemblyman
- Albert L. Smith Jr. (1931–1997), member of U.S. House of Representatives from Alabama
- Albert James Smith (1822–1883), premier of New Brunswick, Canada 1865–1866
- Albert Edward Smith (1871–1947), Canadian religious leader and politician
- Albert Smith (British politician) (1867–1942), British MP and trade unionist
- Albert Smith (South Australian politician) (1881–1965), member of the Australian House of Representatives
- Albert Smith (New South Wales politician) (1885–1975), member of the New South Wales Legislative Assembly

== Sports ==
- Albert Smith (cricketer) (1863–?), English cricketer
- Albert Smith (footballer, born 1869) (1869–1921), England international
- Albert Smith (footballer, born 1887) (1887–1929), English football winger
- Albert Smith (footballer, born 1898) (1898–?), English footballer
- Albert Smith (footballer, born 1905) (1905–?), Scottish footballer
- A. J. Smith (Albert J. Smith, 1949–2024), American football player, coach, scout, and executive

== Other ==
- Albert Charles Smith (1906–1999), American botanist
- Albert Daniel Smith (1887–1970), American pioneer aviator
- Albert Eugene Smith (1907–1973), American computing pioneer
- Albert Hugh Smith (1903–1967), English scholar of Old English and Scandinavian languages
- Albert Joseph Smith (1898–1973), U.S. Marine Corps Medal of Honor recipient
- Albert C. Smith (United States Army officer) (1894–1974), United States Army general
- Albert Alexander Smith (1896–1940), African-American artist
- Albert Smith, a fictional character from Power Rangers Dino Charge

== See also ==
- Albert Smith Medal
- Al Smith (disambiguation)
- George Albert Smith (disambiguation)
- List of people with surname Smith
- Smith (disambiguation)
- Albert E. S. Smythe (1861–1947), Irish-born Canadian journalist, poet, and leader in the theosophy movement
