= George Smith (footballer, born 1936) =

English footballer

Personal information
- Full name: George Henry Smith
- Date of birth: 13 April 1936
- Place of birth: Nottingham, England
- Position: Goalkeeper

Youth career
- Dale Rovers

Senior career*
| Years | Team | Apps | (Gls) |
| 1953–1967 | Notts County | 323 | (0) |
| 1967–1970 | Hartlepool | 112 | (0) |
- * Club domestic league appearances and goals

George Henry Smith (born 13 April 1936) is an English former professional football goalkeeper who made 435 appearances in the Football League.

Smith was born in Nottingham, and began his career with local minor side Dale Rovers before attracting the attentions of Football League club Notts County. He signed for the club in July 1953 but did not make his debut until the 1955-56 season, although before long he established himself as number one, a position he held for over a decade. He left the club in the 1967 close season to play three seasons as first choice at Hartlepool.
