= Gregory Blake Smith =

American novelist

Gregory Blake Smith (born 1951) is an American novelist and short story writer. His novel, The Divine Comedy of John Venner, was named a Notable Book of 1992 by The New York Times Book Review and his short story collection The Law of Miracles won the 2010 Juniper Prize for Fiction and the 2012 Minnesota Book Award.

Smith holds an undergraduate degree from Bowdoin College and an M.F.A. from the Iowa Writers' Workshop. He has been the George Bennett Fellow at Phillips Exeter Academy and a Wallace Stegner Fellow at Stanford University. He was the Lloyd P. Johnson Norwest Professor of English and the Liberal Arts at Carleton College until his retirement in 2024.

== Works ==
- The Devil in the Dooryard (novel), New York: William Morrow, 1986, and London: William Collins, 1987, ISBN 9780345347060
- The Divine Comedy of John Venner (novel), New York: Poseidon Press, 1992, ISBN 9780671788544
- The Madonna of Las Vegas (novel), New York: Three Rivers Press, 2005, ISBN 9781400081868
- The Law of Miracles (short stories), Amherst: University of Massachusetts Press, 2011, ISBN 9781558499003
- The Maze at Windermere (novel), Viking, January, 2018, ISBN 9780735221925

== Honors ==
- Transatlantic Award, Henfield Foundation, 1982
- George Bennett Fellow, Phillips Exeter Academy, 1983
- Stegner Fellow, Stanford University, 1984
- James A. Michener Award, Copernicus Society, 1985
- National Endowment for the Arts Literary Fellowship, 1988, 2009
- Pushcart Prize, 2006
- Juniper Prize for Fiction, 2010
- Lawrence Foundation Award, 2012
- Minnesota Book Award for Fiction, 2012
