= George Smith (surgeon) =

George Smith MBE FRSE FRCSE FACS (1919–1994) was a 20th-century Scottish surgeon who emigrated to the United States of America.

== Life ==
He was born on 4 June 1919 in Carnoustie the son of John Shand Smith and his wife Lilimina Myles Mathers. He was educated at the Grove Academy. He then studied medicine at St. Andrews University graduating MB ChB in 1942, and starting as an intern at Dundee Royal Infirmary.

In the Second World War he served as surgeon lieutenant with the Royal Navy. In 1945 he was created a Member of the Order of the British Empire (MBE).

In 1959 he became chairman of the St Andrews Medical School and in 1960 became professor of surgery at the University of Aberdeen. In 1967 he was elected a member of the Harveian Society of Edinburgh.< From 1974 to 1978 he also was director of the Institute of Environmental and Offshore Medicine (linked to the oil industry).

Glasgow University awarded him an honorary doctorate (DSc) in 1964. In 1980 he was elected a Fellow of the Royal Society of Edinburgh. His proposers were Alexander Macdonald, J. R. Anderson, William Weipers, Robert Campbell Garry, Martin Smellie, Stanley Alstead, A. W. Kay and J. Cook.

He emigrated to the United States in 1982. In 1983 he became chief of the Veterans Administration Hospital at Fayetteville, North Carolina. From 1985 he was additionally consultant surgeon to Duke University.

He died on 12 September 1994.

== Publications ==
- The Staphylococci

== Family ==
In August 1951 he married Vivienne Mary Tuck. they had three children: Peter John Shand Smith, Pamela Marie Smith and Robert Sidney Smith.
