= George Smith (footballer, born 1868) =

English footballer

Personal information
- Full name: George Smith
- Date of birth: 1868
- Place of birth: Birmingham, England
- Date of death: Unknown
- Position: Left half

Senior career*
Years	Team	Apps	(Gls)
1890–1891	Small Heath	1	(0)
- * Club domestic league appearances and goals

George Smith (1868 – after 1890) was an English professional footballer who played in the Football Alliance for Small Heath. Smith, who was born in Birmingham, played his only league game for the club on 31 March 1891 in a 4–0 defeat at Sunderland Albion; he only played because regular left half Ted Devey missed the train.
