= George Chichester Smythe =

Irish Anglican priest

George Chichester Smythe (1843–1902) was an Irish Anglican priest in the second half of the 19th century and the first decade of the 20th.

Smythe was born in County Antrim and educated at Trinity College, Dublin. Smythe began his ecclesiastical career with a curacythen Vicar of Carnmoney from 1853 to 1893; and Archdeacon of Connor from then until his death.
