= George Williamson Smith =

American priest and educator (1836–?)

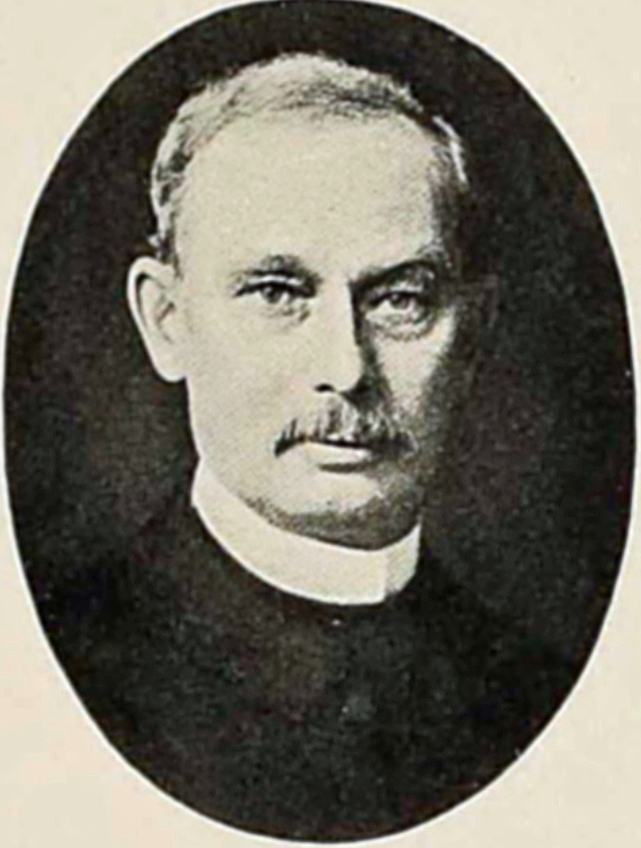

George Williamson Smith (November 21, 1836, in Catskill, New York – ?) was an American Episcopal priest, Navy chaplain and educator. He succeeded T. R. Pynchon as president of Trinity College in Hartford, Connecticut from 1883 until his resignation on June 30, 1904.
