= George Smith (footballer, born 1908) =

English footballer

Personal information
- Full name: George Smith
- Date of birth: 20 November 1908
- Place of birth: Sunderland England
- Date of death: 1986
- Height: 5 ft 11 in (1.80 m)
- Positions: Left half; centre half

Senior career*
Years	Team	Apps	(Gls)
19??–1930	Easington Colliery Welfare		
1930–1932	Watford	1	(0)
1932–1933	Clapton Orient	2	(0)
1933–1934	Darlington	13	(1)
1934–1936	Yeovil & Petters United		
1936–19??	Bath City		
- * Club domestic league appearances and goals

George Smith (20 November 1908 – 1986) was an English footballer who played as a left half or centre half in the Football League for Watford, Clapton Orient and Darlington. He also played non-league football for Easington Colliery Welfare, Yeovil & Petters United and Bath City.

== Football career ==
Smith was born in Sunderland, which was then in County Durham. He began his football career with the Easington school team, and had been playing football as a centre half for Easington Colliery Welfare for "two or three seasons" when he joined Third Division South club Clapton Orient on trial in December 1929. The trial came to nothing, but a year later – by which time he was reportedly "one of the best half-backs in the Wearside League" – he signed for Watford.

He made his Football League debut in the last match of the season, a 1–0 win at Norwich City in the Third Division South, which proved to be his only senior appearance for the club. In August 1932, he signed for Clapton Orient on a free transfer, but played only twice in the league, and in the summer of 1933 returned to the north-east of England to join Darlington. He appeared more frequently for Darlington, playing 13 times in the Third Division North and scoring once.

In June 1934, he joined Southern League club Yeovil & Petters United. He scored 11 goals over the season, helping the club win the Western Section of the Southern League and reach the third round proper of the 1934–35 FA Cup, in which they lost to First Division Liverpool. He played twice for Bath City in the 1936–37 season.
