= George Smith (Australian cricketer) =

Australian cricketer

Personal information
- Born: 22 July 1855; Emerald Hill, Australia
- Died: 7 April 1897 (aged 41); St Kilda, Victoria, Australia

Domestic team information
- Years: Team
- 1877-1885: Victoria
- Source: Cricinfo, 7 June 2015

George Smith (22 July 1855 – 7 April 1897) was an Australian cricketer. He played two first-class cricket matches for Victoria between 1877 and 1885.

== See also ==
- List of Victoria first-class cricketers
