= George Smith (footballer, born May 1901) =

Scottish footballer

Personal information
- Date of birth: 20 May 1901
- Place of birth: Glasgow, Scotland
- Position: Defender

Senior career*
Years	Team	Apps	(Gls)
- Strathclyde
1924?–1928?	Notts County	83	(0)
1928?–1929?	West Ham United	0	(0)
- * Club domestic league appearances and goals

George Smith (born 20 May 1901) was a Scottish-born footballer who played as a right back in the English Football League in the 1920s.

Born in Glasgow, he joined Notts County from Strathclyde FC, and made his first league appearance for them in 1924–25. Smith went on to play 83 league games for County, with his last coming in 1927–28.

Smith then moved on to West Ham United, but he did not play in a senior game for them.
