= George Smith (footballer, born 1902) =

English footballer

Personal information
- Date of birth: 1902
- Place of birth: Liverpool, England
- Height: 5 ft 7 1/2 in (1.71 m)
- Positions: Half-back; inside forward

Senior career*
Years	Team	Apps	(Gls)
- Runcorn
1922–1923	Liverpool	0	(0)
1923–1924	Gillingham	11	(1)
1924–1926	Tranmere Rovers	35	(0)
1926–19??	Coventry City	5	(0)
- Runcorn
- * Club domestic league appearances and goals

George Smith (1902 – after 1926) was an English professional footballer of the 1920s.

Born in Liverpool, he joined Liverpool in 1922 from Runcorn, but never started a match for the "Reds" in The Football League. In 1923 he joined Gillingham of the Football League Third Division South, where he spent one season. He then moved to Tranmere Rovers, where he made 35 Football League appearances. After a short spell with Coventry City, he returned to first club Runcorn.
