= George Smith (footballer, died 1915) =

English footballer

Personal information
- Full name: George Thomas Smith
- Place of birth: United Kingdom
- Date of death: 27 September 1915
- Place of death: Pas-de-Calais, France

Senior career*
Years	Team	Apps	(Gls)
1907–1908	Crystal Palace	11	(3)
1908–	King's Lynn		
- * Club domestic league appearances and goals

George Thomas Smith (died 27 September 1915) was an English footballer who played in the Southern Football League for Crystal Palace.

== Personal life ==
Smith served as a private in the Scots Guards during the First World War and was killed in action in France on 27 September 1915. He is commemorated on the Loos Memorial.

== Career statistics ==
Appearances and goals by club, season and competition
Club	Season	League			FA Cup		Total	
Club	Season	Division	Apps	Goals	Apps	Goals	Apps	Goals
Crystal Palace	1907–08	Southern League First Division	11	3	0	0	11	3
Career total			11	3	0	0	11	3
