= George Smith (Royal Navy officer) =

British Royal Navy captain

Captain George Smith
- Born: 1797?
- Died: 6 April 1850; Southampton
- Occupation: Royal Navy captain

George Smith (1797? – 6 April 1850) was a British Royal Navy captain.

== Biography ==
Smith was born about 1797. He entered the navy in September 1808 on board the Princess Caroline of 74 guns, and, remaining in her for upwards of four years, served in the North Sea, Baltic, and Channel. In February 1813 he was moved into the Undaunted with Captain Thomas Ussher, whom he accompanied to the Duncan of 74 guns in August 1814. On 20 September 1815 he was promoted to be lieutenant. He afterwards served in the Mediterranean and on the coast of South America till his promotion, on 8 September 1829, to the rank of commander. In 1830 he was appointed to superintend the instruction of officers and seamen in gunnery on board the Excellent at Portsmouth, and was advanced to post rank on 13 April 1832. His connection with the gunnery school at Portsmouth led him to invent a new method of sighting ships' guns, a lever target, and the paddle-box lifeboats, which were widely adopted upon paddle-wheel steamers. In June 1849 he was appointed superintendent of packets at Southampton, where he died, unmarried, on 6 April 1850. He was the author of ‘An Account of the Siege of Antwerp’ (1833) and some minor pamphlets on professional subjects.
