= George Smith (cricketer, born 1906) =

English cricketer

Personal information
- Full name: George William Oswald Smith
- Born: 7 March 1906; Halstead, Essex, England
- Died: 25 November 1989 (aged 83); Worthing, Sussex, England
- Batting: Right-handed
- Role: Occasional wicketkeeper

Domestic team information
- Years: Team
- 1929–1930: Essex

Career statistics
Competition	FC
Matches	10
Runs scored	206
Batting average	13.73
100s/50s	–/–
Top score	39*
Balls bowled	–
Wickets	–
Bowling average	–
5 wickets in innings	–
10 wickets in match	–
Best bowling	–
Catches/stumpings	2/–
- Source: Cricinfo, 27 December 2010

George William Oswald Smith (7 March 1906 – 25 November 1989) was an English cricketer. Smith was a right-handed batsman who occasionally played as a wicket-keeper. He was born at Halstead, Essex.

Smith made his first-class debut for Essex in the 1929 County Championship against Derbyshire. Smith played for Essex in the 1929 and 1930 seasons, playing a total of 10 first-class matches, the last of which came against Yorkshire. In his 10 first-class matches, he scored 206 runs at a batting average of 13.73, with a high score of 39*.

He died in Worthing, Sussex on 25 November 1989.
