= George Smith (executioner) =

English executioner (1805–1874)

George Smith (1805–1874), popularly known as Throttler Smith, was an English hangman from 1840 until 1872. He was born in Rowley Regis in the English West Midlands, where he performed the majority of his executions. Although from a good family he became involved with gangs and petty crime in his early life. He was himself arrested and was imprisoned in Stafford Gaol on several occasions for theft.

== Career as a hangman, 1840–1872 ==
Smith learned his trade as an assistant to William Calcraft. His first engagement as Calcraft's assistant was the public execution of James Owen and George Thomas outside Stafford Gaol. Smith was a prisoner at Stafford at the time of Owen and Thomas' execution, and Calcraft appointed Smith for the task because his regular assistant had turned up drunk. In addition, he assisted Calcraft at the first two private hangings in England, of Thomas Wells and Alexander Mackay in 1868. He later obtained the post of public executioner for Staffordshire although he continued to work with Calcraft around the country.

Smith's highest profile hanging was William Palmer, executed on 14 June 1856 after having been found guilty of poisoning John Parsons Cook, but widely believed to have murdered some 14 people including his mother-in-law to fund his gambling debts. Smith was paid £5 plus expenses to carry out the hanging. The notoriety of the case drew large crowds to Stafford for the execution. It was reported that Palmer's last words, spoken to the hangman on the scaffold, were "God bless you".

His final public execution took place in 1866, once again at Stafford Gaol. The victim was a man named William Collier, a poacher who had been found guilty of the murder of a local worthy. Unfortunately for Collier the rope slipped from the overhead beam of the gallows on Smith's first attempt and Collier fell through the trap to the ground with the halter still around his neck. There was a five-minute delay before a replacement could be rigged and Collier executed. A newspaper report referred to the event as a "shocking scene on the scaffold" and reported that the crowd cried "Shame!" and hooted when Collier made his second appearance on the scaffold.

Although Smith's final public execution was held in 1866, he carried on to perform more executions elsewhere. Smith was to hang 20 men and one woman, Sarah Westwood, at Stafford, plus a further three men at Chester, one woman at Kirkdale, two men at Shrewsbury, six men at Warwick and one man at Worcester. George Smith carried out 33 public hangings and just one private one, this held on 13 August 1872, when he hanged 34-year-old Christopher Edwards at Stafford for the murder of his wife.

Smith was renowned for the long white coat and top hat he wore at public hangings. Smith's son, also George, may have assisted at the three executions outside Stafford prison in 1866. Initially, it is said that Smith was hired by the undersheriff of Staffordshire to save the cost of bringing Calcraft up from London. George Incher took over the post of Staffordshire's hangman after Smith's death on 4 April.
