= Lynching of George Smith =

1896 killing of accused murderer in Ransomville, New York, U.S.

Killing of George Smith
- Location: Ransomville, New York, U.S.
- Date: January 10, 1896

The killing of George Smith took place on January 10, 1896, in the village of Ransomville, Niagara County, in the U.S. state of New York. Smith, a white English immigrant, had allegedly murdered his father-in-law, a farmer named Robert Clapsaddle. A posse or mob formed, trapped Smith in a house, and exchanged gunfire with him. Smith was shot and died later that day. Although the coroner claimed Smith committed suicide, sources have described Smith's death as a lynching, one of only a handful in New York state history.

== Background ==
George H. Smith was allegedly unpopular in Ransomville. The Buffalo Times labeled him "one of the roughest characters ever to infest this community." He was a 45-year-old white man and immigrant from England. He was habitually unemployed and often drunk on whiskey. He had married to Clapsaddle's eldest daughter and had a 12-year-old son with her, but she had divorced him and remarried to a local man, John DeClute. Prior to the events of January 10, Smith had been arrested three times, twice for assaulting his father-in-law, whom he blamed for "alienating his wife's affections." More recently, Smith had been convicted of perjury in an unrelated case and had been sentenced to Auburn Prison for five years, being released on November 1, 1895.

== Murder of Robert Clapsaddle ==
At 1 p.m. local time on Friday, January 10, Smith allegedly slinked into the house of Robert Clapsaddle, his 68-year-old father-in-law and a respected farmer who lived in what the papers called "moderate circumstances." Clapsaddle lived in a lonely cottage a mile south of the village of Ransomville with his wife, youngest daughter, and grandson (Smith's son). Smith fired his 38-caliber revolver, hitting Clapsaddle in the head, and fled. The farmer's youngest daughter witnessed the crime. The farmer died a half-hour after the shooting, just a few minutes after a physician arrived. Meanwhile, Smith walked cross-country in the direction of the DeClute house two miles away, prompting speculation that he intended to murder his ex-wife and her husband next.

== Killing of George Smith ==
News of the murder spread swiftly. A posse comprising 50 to 75 men formed under the direction of a police constable and three deputies. All carried rifles, shotguns, revolvers, or clubs. They pursued Smith and caught up with him at 4 o'clock in the afternoon about a quarter of a mile away from De Clute's house. Smith took refuge in a nearby farmer's house. Minutes later, he shot and wounded one of his pursuers, Elmer Clapsaddle, a distant relative of the murder victim, in the wrist. The posse called on Smith to come out and surrender, and when he did not respond, opened fire on the house. The posse kept up the fusillade for several minutes before bursting into the house, where they found Smith bleeding and senseless on the floor, riddled with twenty bullets or buckshot charges. The fatal wound was allegedly a bullet in his head. Despite receiving medical attention, Smith died at around midnight. The Buffalo News reported that he regained consciousness near the end and uttered the defiant last words: "You can't get me alive, damn you. I am nearly dead."

== Aftermath ==
Ransomville held an inquest into Smith's death on January 13. The coroner declared that Smith had committed suicide by shooting himself in the head with his own revolver, despite his many injuries caused by the posse's gunfire. This verdict was convenient for the community, whose members sought to avoid the risk of prosecution for the vigilante killing as well as the taint of "lynching" associated with their town. "Instead of going to the great lengths necessary to defend their unusual decision to lynch a white person," concluded one historian, "they chose to cover up his lynching and portray it as a suicide."
