= George Smith (footballer, born 1886) =

English footballer (1886–1978)

William George Smith
Personal information
- Full name: George Smith
- Date of birth: 28 July 1886
- Place of birth: Peartree Green, England
- Date of death: 1978 (aged 91–92)
- Place of death: Mona Vale, New South Wales
- Positions: Full-back; half-back

Youth career
- Peartree Green

Senior career*
Years	Team	Apps	(Gls)
1907–1912	Southampton	13	(0)
- * Club domestic league appearances and goals

William George Smith (28 July 1886 – 1978) was an English professional footballer who made 13 appearances for Southampton in the Southern League between 1908 and 1911. He was a versatile player who was used in various defensive and midfield positions. He later emigrated to Australia.

== Football career ==
Smith was born in the Peartree Green area of Southampton and played his youth football with his local team before signing for Southampton in the summer of 1907. During his five years with the "Saints", Smith was used mainly in the reserves with whom he won the Hampshire Senior Cup in 1908 and 1910, as well as winning the Hampshire League twice and the Southampton Senior Cup twice.

His first-team debut came on 21 March 1908 when he took the place of Horace Glover at left-back for the home Southern League match against Norwich City, which ended in a 3–0 defeat. Smith made two further appearances in April, at right-half and right-back. Smith was never given a long run of matches in the first-team and was used as cover for more established players. He made five appearances in 1908–09, followed by four in 1909–10 and his final appearance came in the last match of the 1910–11 season. Of his 13 appearances, all but three were as a full-back, although he was played at outside-right at Northampton Town on 29 January 1910.

== Later career ==
In the summer of 1912, Smith was rewarded for his loyalty with a benefit match against Woolston which raised £23 13s. 3d. In November of that year he emigrated to Australia.
