= Greg Smith (artist) =

American artist

- Born: 1970 (age 54–55); DeKalb, Illinois, U.S.
- Education: Amherst College, Harvard University, Hunter College
- Known for: Installation art, sculpture, and video

Greg Smith (born 1970) is an American interdisciplinary artist based in Brooklyn, New York whose practice consists of installation art, sculpture, and video.

== Early life and education ==
Smith was born in DeKalb, Illinois in 1970. He received a Bachelor of Arts from Amherst College in 1993, a Doctor of Philosophy in Physics from Harvard University in 2000, and a Master of Fine Arts from Hunter College in 2005.

== Career and work ==
Greg Smith stages exhibitions that often include a combination of installation art, sculpture, and video. John Yau, in an article for Hyperallergic, described Smith as “an absurdist inventor, a performer attracted to risk, a scientist (he did get a PhD in Physics from Harvard, by the way), an analytical storyteller who refuses to settle for easy parodies, and, perhaps most importantly, an artist who is too self-respectful to take shortcuts or feints.” Reviews of his work have also appeared in The New York Times, New York Magazine, Paper, The Brooklyn Rail, Hyperallergic, and Studio International.

Smith has exhibited widely with solo shows at the Museum of Fine Arts, St. Petersburg; the McNay Art Museum, San Antonio; Cress Gallery of Art at the University of Tennessee, Chattanooga; and the Faulconer Gallery at Grinnell College, Iowa. He has also participated in group exhibitions at national institutions such as the John Michael Kohler Arts Center, Sheboygan; Atlanta Contemporary Art Center; Weatherspoon Art Museum, Greensboro; and, the Hudson Valley Center for Contemporary Art in Peekskill, New York. Screenings of the artist's video works have been held at the Museum of Modern Art in New York City and Galapagos Art Space in Brooklyn, New York.

In 2022, his solo show Absent Word Double presented banners combining various media and words from the BiP39 word list. He linked digital assets to his artworks and viewers could claim the assets by grabbing the code phrase included in the artworks.

Greg Smith is represented by Susan Inglett Gallery, Chelsea, NYC.

== Solo exhibitions ==
2022 Absent Word Double - Susan Inglett Gallery

2019 GARAGE POLITBURO - Susan Inglett Gallery

2016 Zero Width Non-Joiner - Susan Inglett Gallery

2014 Breakdown Lane - Susan Inglett Gallery

2012 Ners Banners Banners Ban - Susan Inglett Gallery

2010 Bearded - Susan Inglett Gallery

2008 Asterisk - Susan Inglett Gallery

2007 Summer of Love - Susan Inglett Gallery

2006 Great Plains - Susan Inglett Gallery
