= George Smith (cricketer, born 1876) =

English cricketer

George Smith (13 January 1876 – 16 January 1929) was an English first-class cricketer, who played two games for Yorkshire County Cricket Club between 1901 and 1906.

Smith was born in Thorp Arch, Wetherby, Yorkshire, England, and made his first-class debut against Cambridge University in 1901, and reappeared in 1906 against Warwickshire. He batted just once in that time, scoring seven runs. Smith took 0 for 62 with the ball, but held three catches.

Smith died in January 1929, in Thorp Arch, Yorkshire.
