= George P. Smith =

George P. Smith may refer to:

- George P. Smith (chemist) (born 1941), American Nobel Prize laureate
- George P. Smith (politician) (1873–1942), Canadian politician and Minister of the Crown
- George P. Smith II (born 1939), American professor of law
- George Paton Smith (1829–1877), Australian politician and Attorney-General of Victoria
