= Central Criminal Court Act 1856 =

Act of the Parliament of the United Kingdom

Central Criminal Court Act 1856 (Note: The citation of this act by this short title was authorised by section 1 of, and the first schedule to, the Short Titles Act 1896. Due to the repeal of those provisions it is now authorised by section 19(2) of the Interpretation Act 1978.)
- Act of Parliament
- Parliament of the United Kingdom
- Long title: An Act to empower the Court of Queen's Bench to order certain Offenders to be tried at the Central Criminal Court.
- Citation: 19 & 20 Vict. c. 16
- Territorial extent: England and Wales (Note: Preamble.)

Dates
- Royal assent: 11 April 1856
- Commencement: 11 April 1856 (Note: The Acts of Parliament (Commencement) Act 1793.)
- Repealed: 1 January 1939
Other legislation
Repealed by	Administration of Justice (Miscellaneous Provisions) Act 1938

Status: Repealed

History of passage through Parliament

Text of statute as originally enacted

The Central Criminal Court Act 1856 (19 & 20 Vict. c. 16), originally known as the Trial of Offences Act 1856 and popularly known as Palmer's Act, was an act of the Parliament of the United Kingdom. The Act allowed a crime committed outside the City of London or the County of Middlesex to be tried at the Central Criminal Court in the Old Bailey, rather than in the county where the crime had allegedly been committed, if a judge of the Court of Queen's Bench decided that "it is expedient to the ends of justice".

The act was passed in direct and urgent response to anxieties that doctor and accused murderer William Palmer would not be able to have a fair trial at the assize court in his native Staffordshire because of public revulsion at the allegations. By conducting Palmer's trial at a neutral venue, there could be no appeal for a retrial on the basis that the court and jury had been prejudiced against the defendant.

However, an alternative hypothesis is that Palmer was a popular figure in Rugeley and would not have been found guilty by a Staffordshire jury: the implication being that the trial location was moved for political reasons so as to secure a guilty verdict. Lord Chief Justice Campbell—the senior judge at Palmer’s trial—suggested in his autobiography that, had Palmer been tried at Stafford Assizes, he would have been found not guilty.

== Subsequent developments ==
The whole act was repealed by section 20(3) of, and the fourth schedule to, the Administration of Justice (Miscellaneous Provisions) Act 1938 (1 & 2 Geo. 6. c. 63), which came into force on 1 January 1939.

== Bibliography ==
- Davenport-Hines, R. (2004) "Palmer, William [the Rugeley Poisoner] (1824–1856)", Oxford Dictionary of National Biography, Oxford University Press, accessed 20 July 2007 (subscription required)
