= George Alvin Smith =

Virginia businessman

George A. Smith
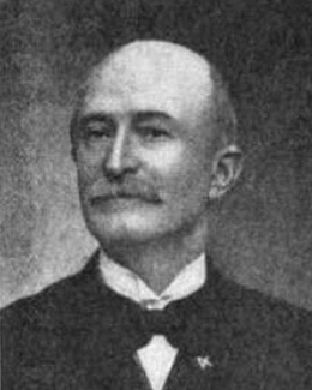
- Smith, c. 1900s
- Born: January 14, 1844; Richmond, Virginia, U.S.
- Died: February 11, 1908 (aged 64); Richmond, Virginia, U.S.
- Occupation: Merchant
- Title: President of the Smith–Courtney Company (1891–1908)
- Spouses: May Bell Morris (m. 1871; died 1883) Mary Edmonia Taylor (m. 1885)
- Children: 9

George Alvin Smith (January 14, 1844 – February 11, 1908) was an American merchant who served as the first president of the Smith–Courtney Company in Richmond, Virginia. He fought for the Confederacy in the American Civil War, losing his arm at the Battle of Fredericksburg. Shortly thereafter, he and Charles Rady partnered to sell railway equipment. Following Rady's retirement, Smith and T. L. Courtney expanded the business, producing wood and iron working supplies, engines, boilers, and more.

By the end of his life, Smith's company was the largest manufacturer and distributor of machinery in the Southern United States, and he was one of the most prominent members of Richmond society, a member of Confederate veterans organizations and the Episcopal Church. He was a founding member of the Southern Supply and Machinery Dealers' Association.

== Early life and family ==
=== Birth ===
Smith was born in Richmond, Virginia, on January 14, 1844, the fifth of six children. His father, businessman Benjamin Hodges Smith (1807–1881), was a Salem, Massachusetts, native who came to Virginia at an early age. His mother, the former Grace Fenton Brooke (1814–1893), was a niece of jurist Francis T. Brooke and descendant of the First Families of Virginia.

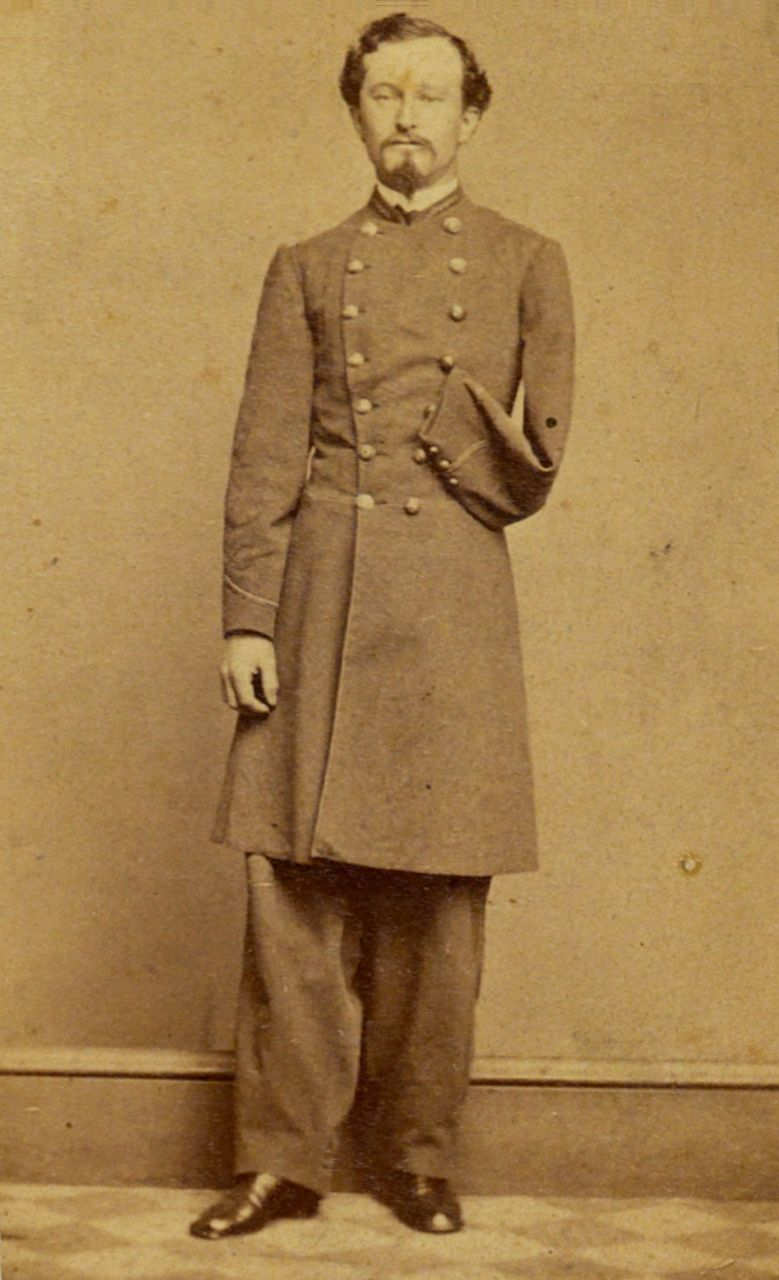
Smith in uniform after losing his arm at Fredericksburg

=== Military service ===
At the outbreak of the American Civil War, Smith's family sided with the Confederacy. He and three of his brothers enlisted in the third company of the Richmond Howitzers, while Benjamin received a commission as a quartermaster. Fighting with the Army of Northern Virginia, the company saw action during the Seven Days Battles, shortly after which, Smith's brother, Benjamin Jr., was named captain of the battery in August 1862.

That year, they went on to fight at the Second Battle of Bull Run, the Battle of Antietam, and the Battle of Fredericksburg, where Smith lost his left arm. Benjamin Jr. continued to command the unit at the Battle of Chancellorsville, the Battle of Gettysburg, and the Battle of Mine Run, even after having his foot amputated following an injury in October 1863. Smith's other brother, Edward, was killed at Battle of Spotsylvania Court House in May 1864.

After the loss of his arm, Smith was promoted to lieutenant and served with the President's Guard. He followed Jefferson Davis and his cabinet on their retreat from Richmond; into his later years, he treasured a personal letter from William Preston Johnston, commending him for his service.

=== Marriages and children ===
Smith married May Bell Morris, a daughter of the publisher Adolphus Morris, on September 20, 1871, in Richmond, in a ceremony officiated by Charles Minnigerode. They had six children: Edward Brooke (b. 1872), Alvin Morris (b. 1874), Carroll La Gree (b. 1876), who died in infancy, Malcolm Bell (b. 1878), Blanche Morris (b. 1880), and George Alvin Jr. (b. 1883). Months after the birth of their youngest child, May died of tuberculosis on December 1, 1883.

On November 18, 1885, in Orange County, Smith married Mary Edmonia Taylor, a daughter of Erasmus Taylor, who served on James Longstreet's staff. From this marriage were born another three children: Roberta Ashby (b. 1886), Benjamin Hodges (b. 1887), and Mary Eleanor (b. 1889), who died in infancy.

== Business career ==
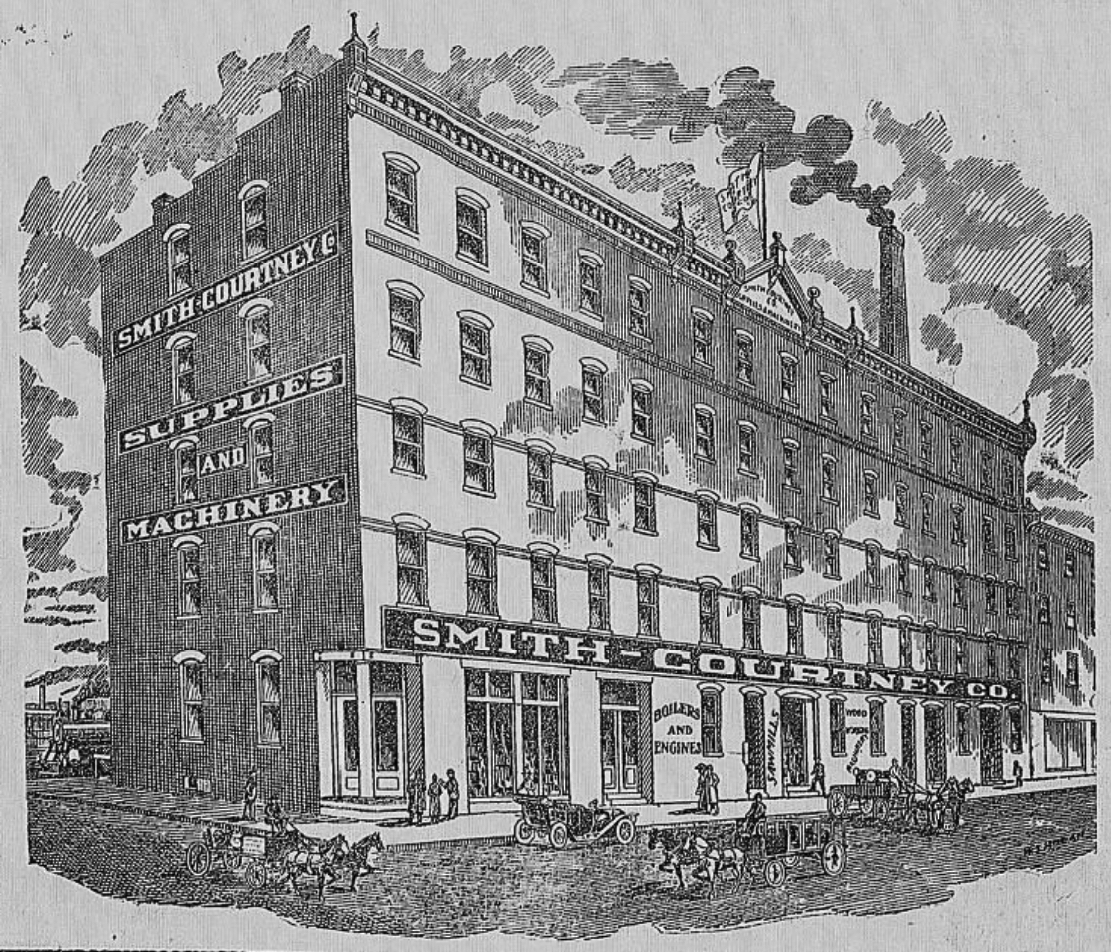
Headquarters of the Smith-Courtney Company

== Later life and death ==
Smith had been in a period of declining health for some time, though his condition was not critical. On February 9, 1908, while in Chase City to rest and recuperate, he suffered a stroke, from which he never recovered. He died at his home, 823 West Grace Street, at 8:30pm on February 11. He was buried in a family plot in Hollywood Cemetery alongside his sons, Edward and George Jr., and infant daughter, Mary, who all preceded him in death. Dignitaries at the funeral included Lieutenant Governor J. Taylor Ellyson and a delegation from Lee Camp, Confederate Veterans. He left his entire estate, valued at $68,855 (equivalent to $2,409,670 in 2024), to his widow.

His son, Alvin, who had been general sales manager of the company since 1902, was unanimously elected by the board to succeed him as president and served until his own death in 1952. His other son, Benjamin, then took over, serving until 1962, when he was elected chairman of the board.
