= George Smith (footballer, born 1890) =

English footballer (1890–?)

Personal information
- Full name: George Arthur Smith
- Date of birth: 15 February 1890
- Place of birth: London, England

Senior career*
Years	Team	Apps	(Gls)
- Ilford
1912–1913	Genoa		
1913–1915	Alessandria		

Managerial career
- 1913–1915: Alessandria
- * Club domestic league appearances and goals

George Arthur Smith (born 15 February 1890) was an English football player and manager.

== Career ==
Born in London, Smith played for Ilford, before moving to Italian side Genoa in 1912. He was player-manager of Alessandria between 1913 and 1915.
