= William Palmer (murderer) =

English murderer (1824–1856)

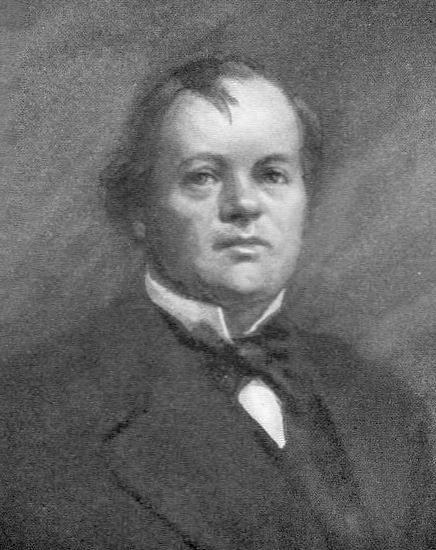
- William Palmer (drawing by Joseph Simpson, 1912)
- Born: 6 August 1824; Rugeley, Staffordshire, England
- Died: 14 June 1856 (aged 31); Stafford Prison, England
- Cause of death: Execution by hanging
- Occupation: Doctor
- Spouse: Ann Palmer (m.1847–d.1854)
- Children: 5 + numerous illegitimates
- Conviction: Murder
- Penalty: Death

William Palmer (6 August 1824 – 14 June 1856), also known as the Rugeley Poisoner or the Prince of Poisoners, was an English doctor and murderer. A court convicted him for the 1855 murder of his friend John Cook, whom he had poisoned with strychnine. He was also suspected of poisoning several other people including his brother and his mother-in-law, as well as four of his children. Palmer made large sums of money from the deaths of his wife and brother after collecting on life insurance, and by defrauding his wealthy mother.

Palmer was convicted and hanged in public in 1856. Charles Dickens called Palmer "the greatest villain that ever stood in the Old Bailey".

== Early life and suspected poisonings ==
William Palmer was born in Rugeley, Staffordshire, the sixth of eight children of Joseph and Sarah Palmer. His father worked as a sawyer and died when William was aged 12, leaving Sarah with a legacy of £70,000.

At age 17, Palmer worked as an apprentice at a Liverpool chemist, but was dismissed after three months following allegations of theft. He studied medicine in London and qualified as a physician in August 1846. After returning to Staffordshire later that year, Palmer met plumber and glazier George Abley at the Lamb and Flag public house in Little Haywood, and challenged him to a drinking contest. Abley accepted, and an hour later was carried home, where he died in bed later that evening; nothing was ever proved, but locals noted that Palmer had an interest in Abley's attractive wife.

Palmer returned to Rugeley to practise as a doctor and, in St. Nicholas Church, Abbots Bromley, married Ann Thornton (born 1827; also known as Brookes as her mother was the mistress of a Colonel Brookes) on 7 October 1847. His mother-in-law, also called Ann Thornton, had inherited a fortune of £8,000 after Colonel Brookes committed suicide in 1834. The elder Thornton died on 18 January 1849, two weeks after coming to stay with Palmer; she was known to have lent him money. An elderly Dr. Bamford recorded a verdict of apoplexy. Palmer was disappointed with the inheritance he and his wife gained from the death, having expected it to be much greater.

Palmer became interested in horse racing and borrowed money from Leonard Bladen, a man he met at the races. Bladen lent him £600, but died at Palmer's house on 10 May 1850. Palmer's wife was surprised to find that Bladen died with little money on him despite having recently won a large sum at the races; his betting books were also missing, so there was no evidence of his having lent Palmer any money. Bladen's death certificate listed Palmer as "present at the death" and stated the cause of death as "injury of the hip joint, 5 or 6 months; abscess in the pelvis".

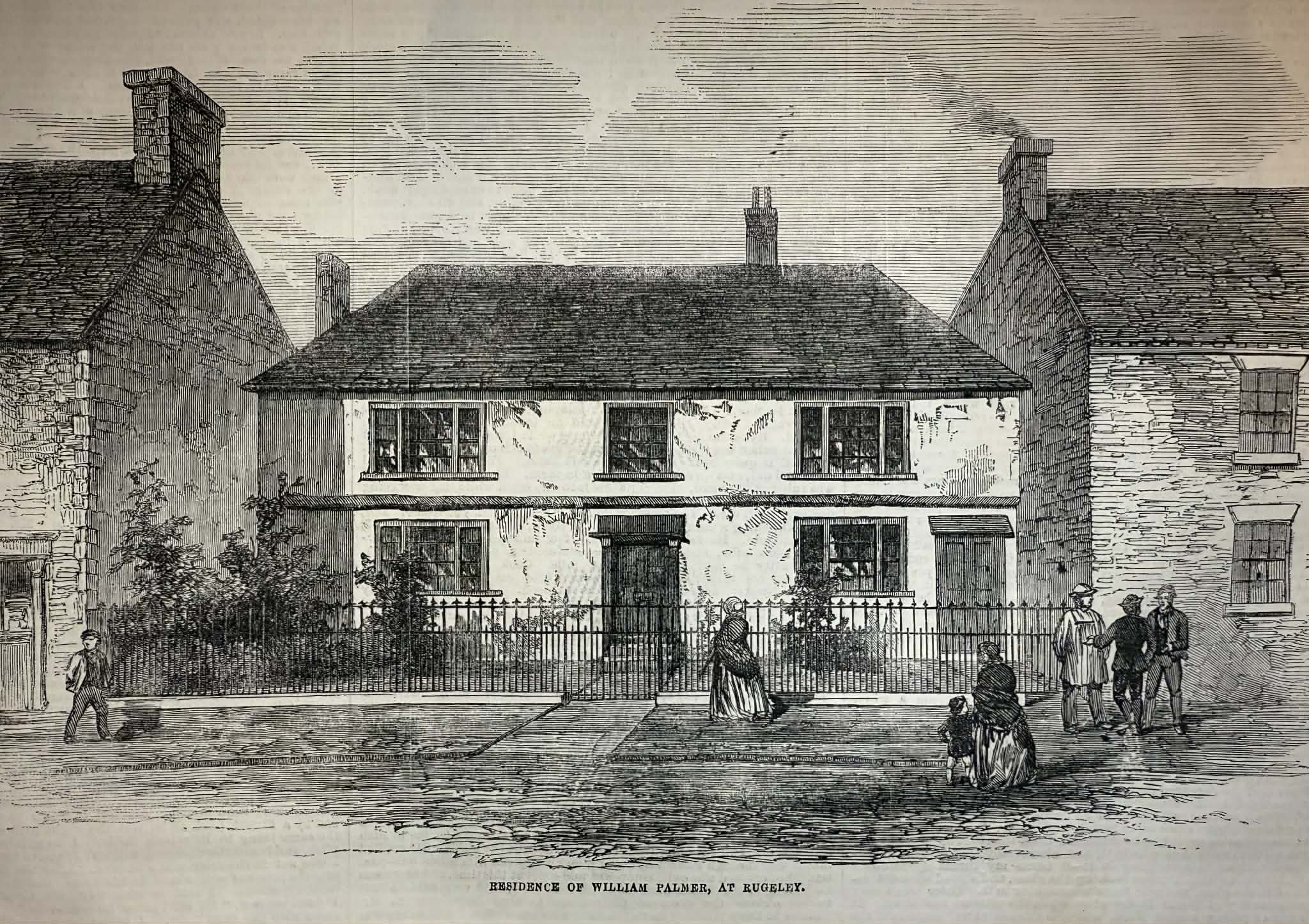
Residence of William Palmer, at Rugeley. Illustrated London News, 24 May 1856.

Palmer's first son, William Brookes Palmer, was born towards the end of 1848 and christened in January 1849. He outlived his father, dying on 29 April 1926. The Palmers had four more children, all of whom died in infancy. The cause of death for each child was listed as "convulsions":

- Elizabeth Palmer. Died on 6 January 1851. She was about two and a half months old at the time of death.
- Henry Palmer. Died on 6 January 1852. He was about a month old.
- Frank Palmer. Died on 19 December 1852, only seven hours following his birth.
- John Palmer. Died on 27 January 1854. He was three or four days old.

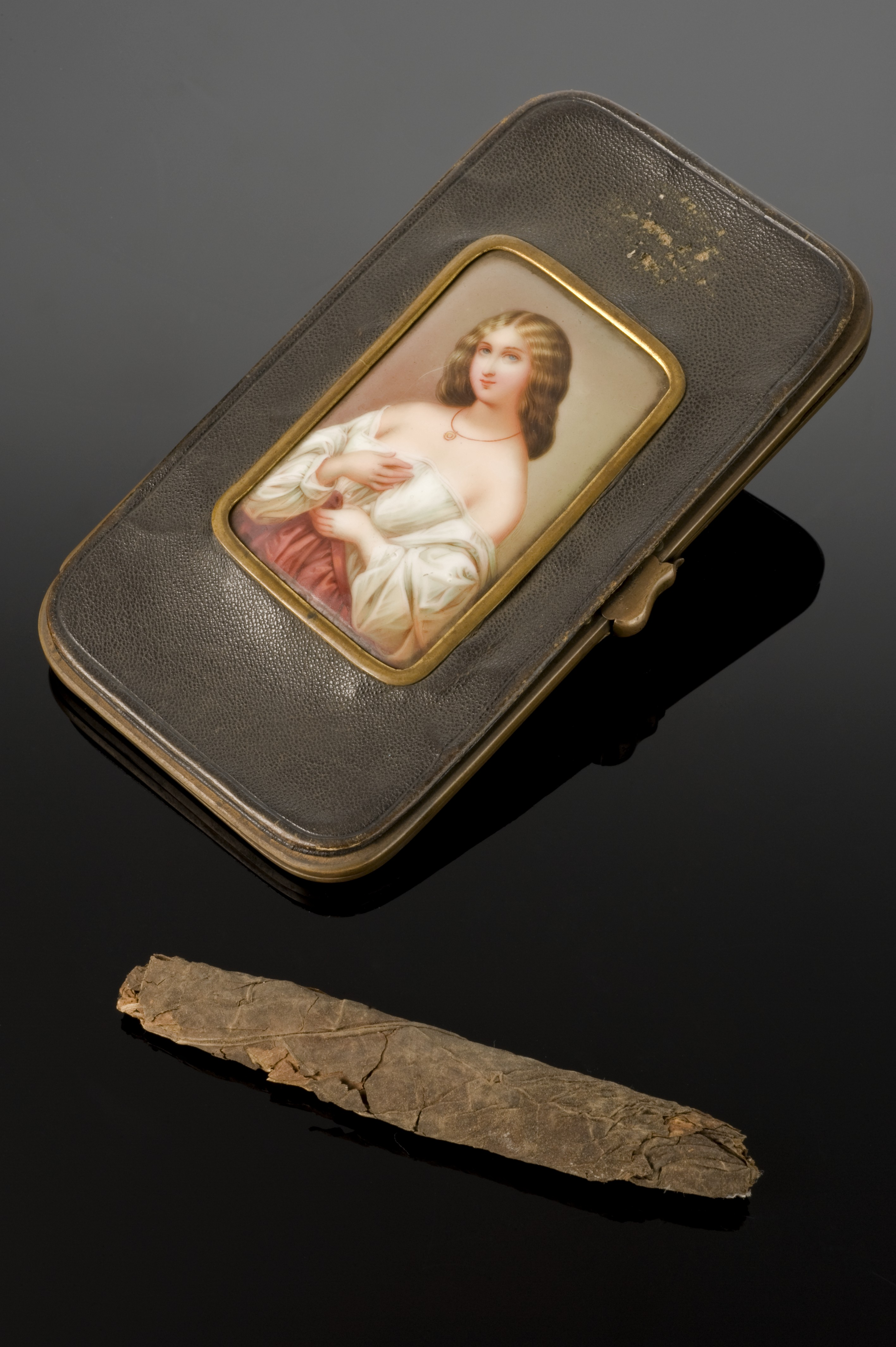
Dr. William Palmer's cigar case with cigar, made in France, 1840–1856

As infant mortality was not uncommon at the time, these deaths were not initially seen as suspicious, though after Palmer's conviction in 1856 there was speculation that he had administered poison to the children to avoid the expense of more mouths to feed. By 1854 he was heavily in debt and resorting to forging his mother's signature to pay off creditors. Palmer took out life insurance on his wife with the Prince of Wales Insurance Company, and paid out a premium of £750 for a policy of £13,000. Her death followed on 29 September 1854, at twenty-seven years old. She was believed to have died of cholera, as a cholera pandemic was affecting the United Kingdom (causing 23,000 deaths across the country) at the time.

Still heavily in debt, with two creditors (to whom he owed £12,500 and £10,400) threatening to speak to his mother and thereby expose his fraud, Palmer attempted to take out life insurance on his brother Walter for the sum of £84,000. Unable to find a company willing to insure him for such a sum, he instead returned to the Prince of Wales Insurance Company, paying out a premium of £780 for a policy of £14,000. Walter, an alcoholic, soon became reliant on his brother, who readily plied him with several bottles of gin and brandy a day; he died on 16 August 1855. However, the insurance company refused to pay out Walter's policy and instead dispatched inspectors Simpson and Field to investigate. The pair found that Palmer had also been attempting to take out £10,000 worth of insurance on the life of George Bate, a farmer who was briefly under his employment. They discovered that Bate was either misinformed or lying about the details of his insurance policy, and informed Palmer that the company would recommended a further inquiry into Walter's death.

At about this time, Palmer was involved in an affair with his housemaid, Eliza Tharme. On 26 or 27 June 1855, Tharme gave birth to Palmer's illegitimate son Alfred, thus increasing the doctor's financial burdens. With his life and debts spiralling out of control, Palmer planned the murder of his erstwhile friend John Cook.

== Murder of John Cook ==
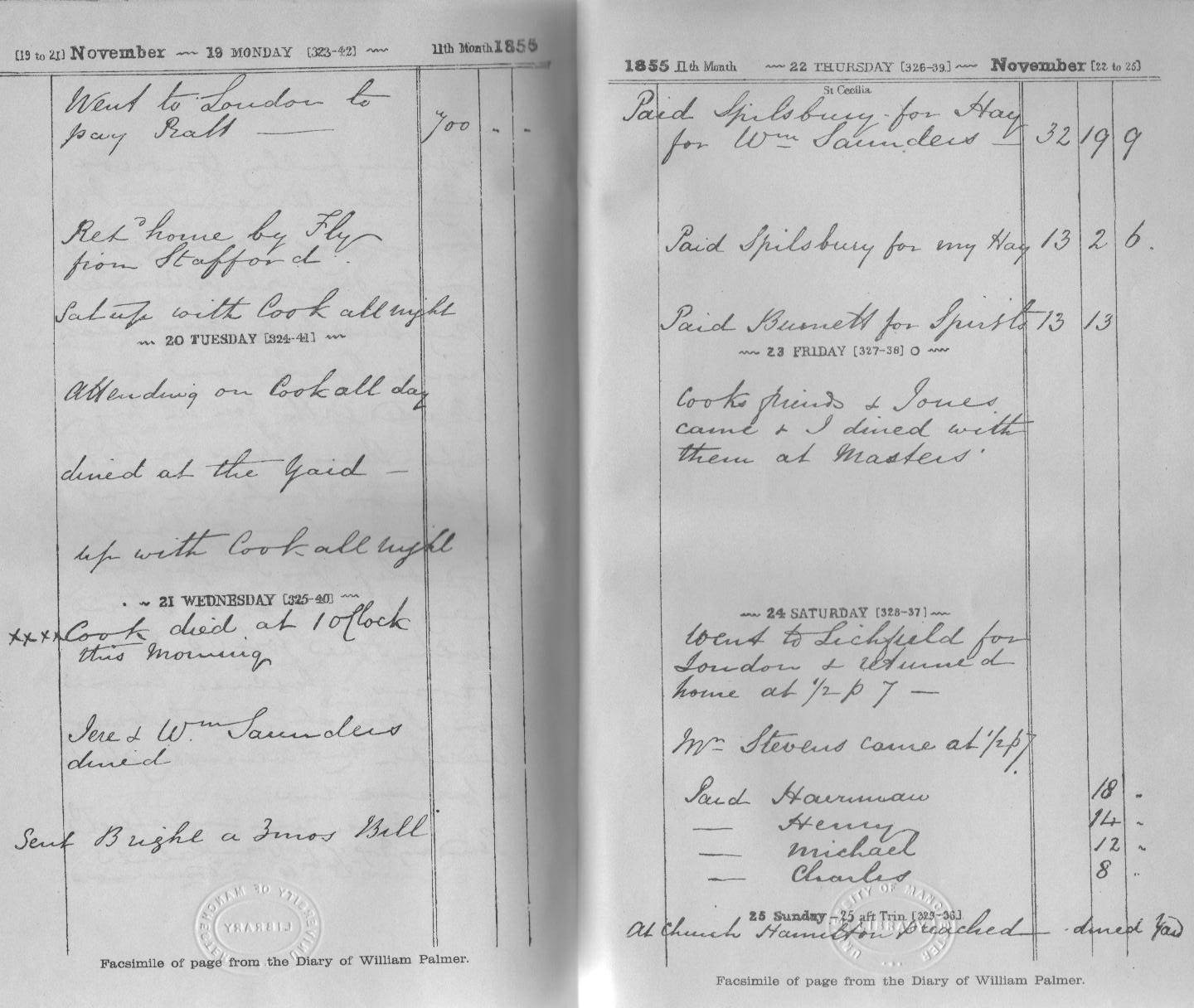
Palmer's diary recording the death of Cook

John Parsons Cook, a sickly young man with an inherited fortune of £12,000, was a friend of Palmer. In November 1855, the pair attended the Shrewsbury Handicap Stakes and bet on various horses between 13 and 15 November. Cook won £3,000 by betting on "Polestar"; Palmer lost heavily by betting instead on "the Chicken". Cook and Palmer had a celebration party at the Raven, a local drinking establishment. Already on 14 November, Cook was complaining that his gin had burnt his throat; Palmer responded by making a scene in which he attempted to convince bemused onlookers that there was nothing untoward in Cook's glass. Afterwards Cook fell violently ill and told two friends, George Herring and Ishmael Fisher, that, "I believe that damn Palmer has been dosing me." On 15 November, Palmer and Cook returned to Rugeley, at which point Cook booked a room at the Talbot Arms.

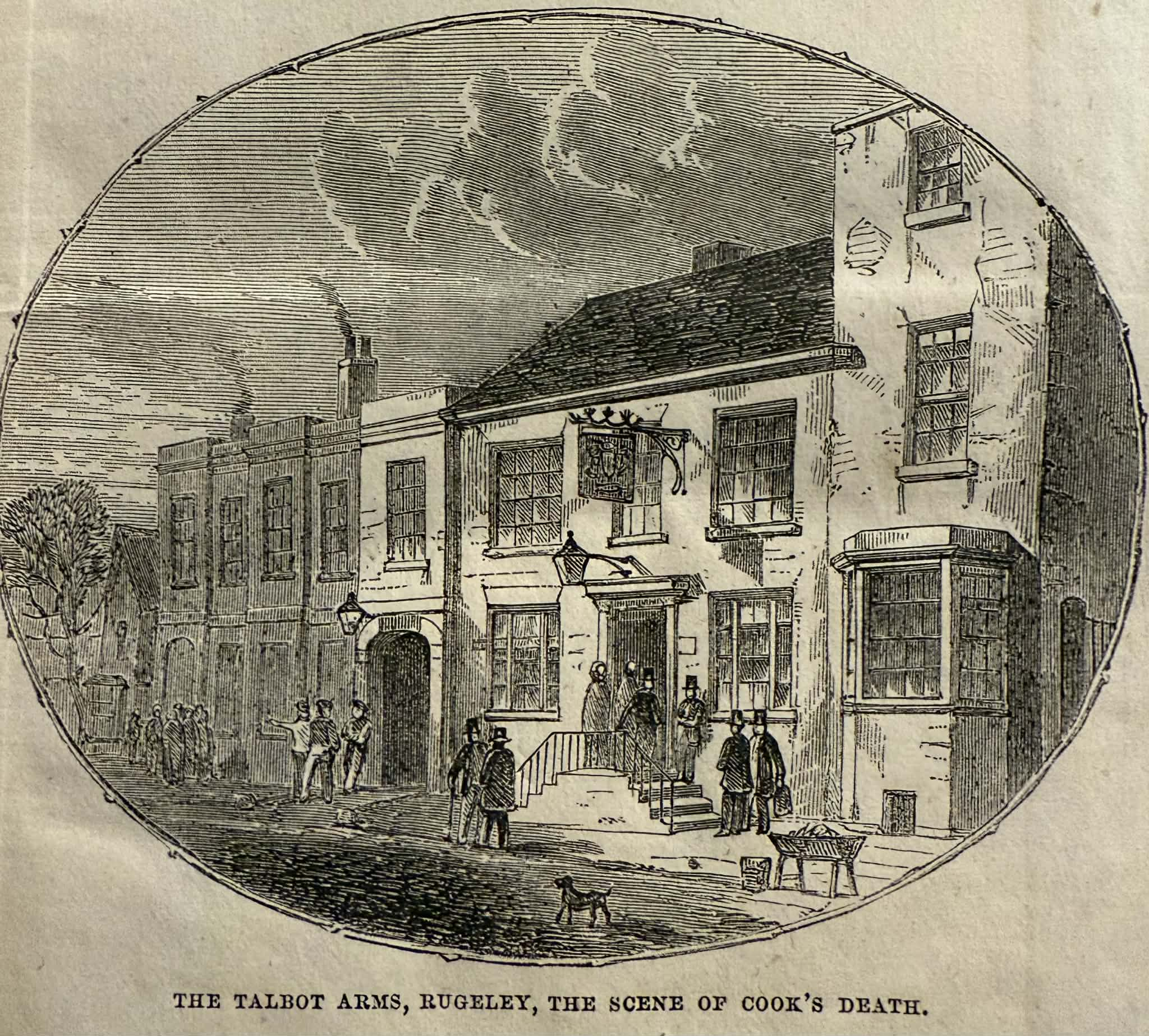
The Talbot Arms, where John Parsons Cook died on 21 November 1855.

Earlier on 14 November, Palmer had received a letter from a creditor named Pratt, who threatened to visit his mother and ask for his money if Palmer himself would not pay his debt soon. The following day he bet heavily on a horse and lost. Having seemingly recovered from his illness, Cook met with Palmer for a drink on 17 November and soon found himself sick once again. At this point Palmer assumed responsibility for Cook; Cook's solicitor, Jeremiah Smith, sent over a bottle of gin, which Palmer had in his possession before he sent it. Chambermaid Elizabeth Mills took a sip of the gin and subsequently fell ill; Cook was given the rest of the gin, and his vomiting became worse than ever. The next day, Palmer began collecting bets on behalf of Cook, bringing home £1,200. He then purchased three grains of strychnine from the surgery of Dr. Salt and put the grains into two pills, which he then administered to Cook. On 21 November, not long after Palmer administered two ammonia pills, Cook died in agony at about 1:00 am, screaming that he was suffocating.

On 23 November, William Stevens, Cook's stepfather, arrived to represent the family. Palmer informed him the deceased had lost his betting books, which he further claimed were of no use as all bets were cancelled once the gambler had died; he also told Stevens that Cook had £4,000 in outstanding bills. Stevens requested an inquest, which was granted. Meanwhile, Palmer obtained a death certificate from 80-year-old Dr. Bamford, which listed the cause of death as "apoplexy".

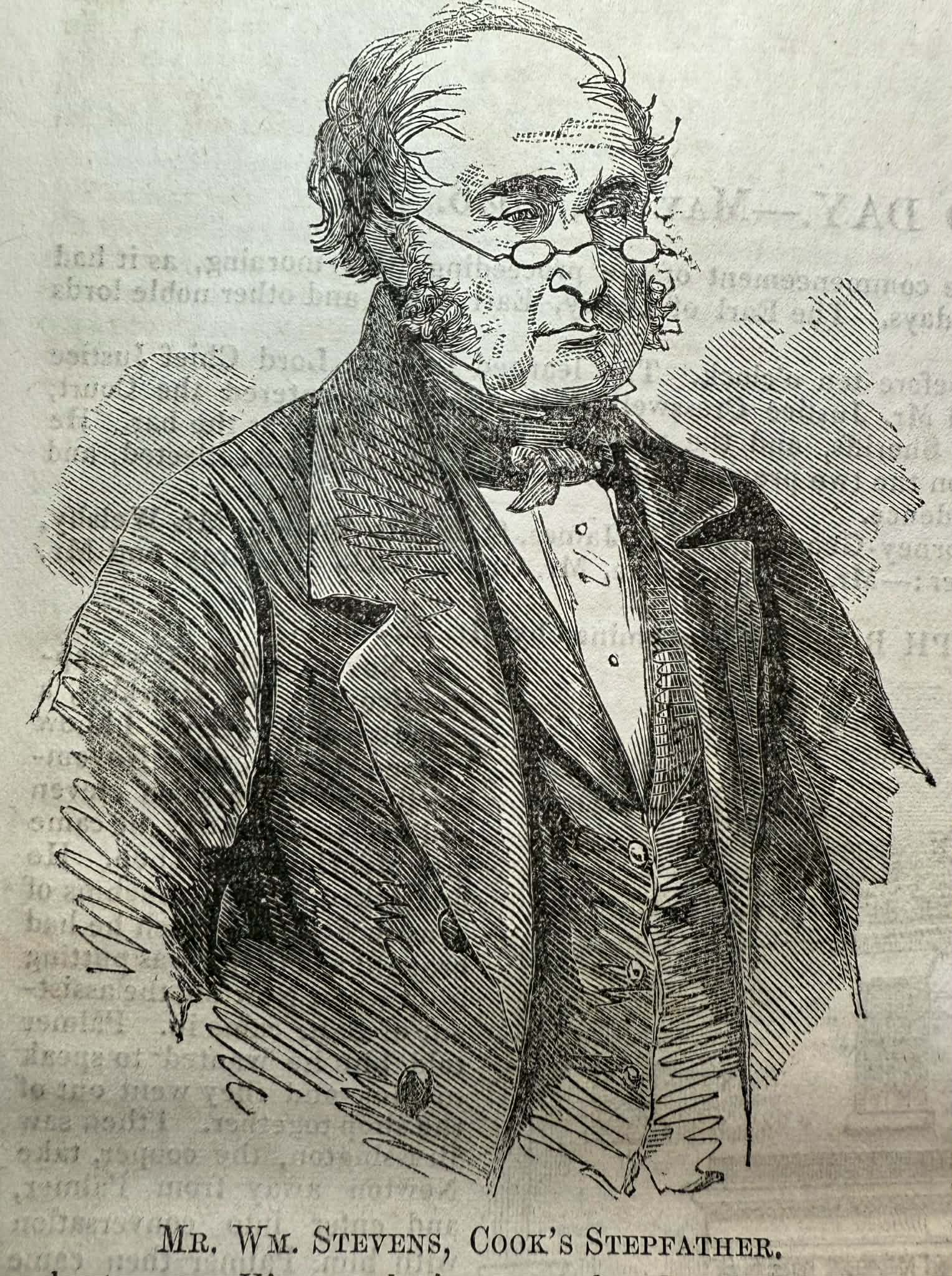
Mr. William Stevens, John Parsons Cook's stepfather

A post-mortem examination of Cook's body took place at the Talbot Arms on 26 November, carried out by medical student Charles Devonshire and assistant Charles Newton, and overseen by Dr. Harland and numerous other onlookers. Newton was drunk, and Palmer himself interfered with the examination, bumping into Newton and taking the stomach contents off in a jar for "safekeeping". The jars were sent off to Alfred Swaine Taylor, who complained that such poor quality samples were of no use to him, and a second post-mortem took place on 29 November. Postmaster Samuel Cheshire intercepted letters addressed to the coroner on behalf of Palmer; Cheshire was later prosecuted for interfering with the mail and imprisoned for two years. Palmer also wrote to the coroner himself, requesting that the verdict of death be given as natural causes, enclosing in his letter a £10 note.

Taylor found no evidence of poison, but still stated that it was his belief that Cook had been poisoned. The jury at the inquest delivered their verdict on 15 December, stating that the "Deceased died of poison wilfully administered to him by William Palmer"; at the time, this verdict could be legally handed down at an inquest.

== Arrest and trial ==
Judges
Lord Chief Justice John Campbell, 1st Baron Campbell
Mr Justice Cresswell
Mr Baron Alderson
Prosecution counsel
Attorney-General Alexander Cockburn
Edwin James QC
Mr Bodkin
Mr Welsby
John Walter Huddleston
Defence counsel
Mr Serjeant Shee
William Robert Grove QC
Mr Gray
Edward Kenealy

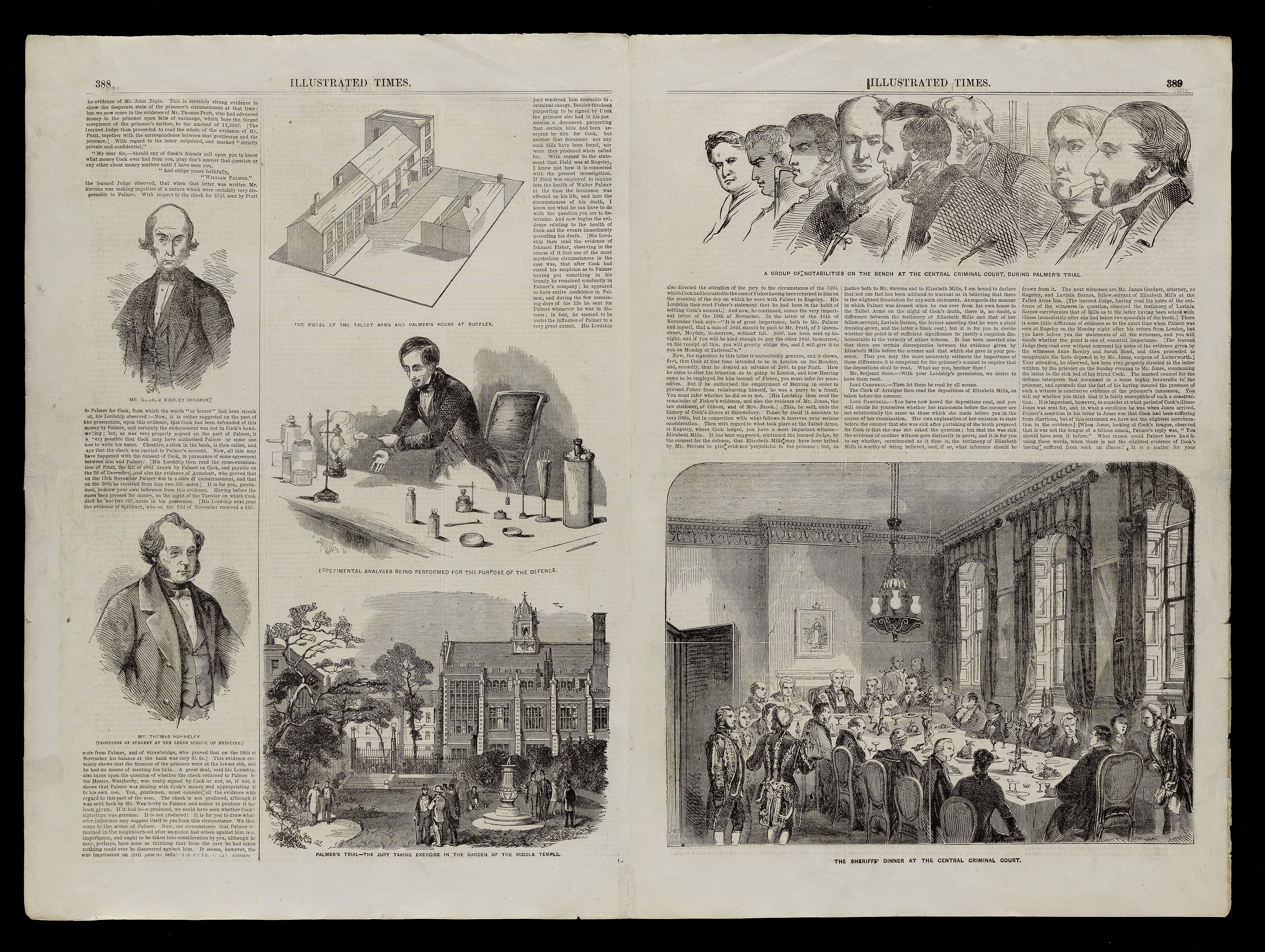
Double page feature on the trial of William Palmer in the Illustrated Times, 27 May 1856.

Palmer was arrested on the charge of murder and forgery, and was detained at Stafford Gaol; he threatened to go on hunger strike, but backed down when the governor informed him that this would lead to his being force fed.

An Act of Parliament (the Central Criminal Court Act 1856) was passed to allow Palmer's trial to be held at the Old Bailey in London, as it was felt that a fair jury could not be found in Staffordshire, where detailed accounts of the case had been printed by local newspapers. However, an alternative hypothesis is that Palmer was a popular figure in Rugeley and would not have been found guilty by a Staffordshire jury: the implication being that the trial location was moved for political reasons so as to secure a guilty verdict. Lord Chief Justice Campbell, the senior judge at Palmer's trial, suggested in his autobiography that, had Palmer been tried at Stafford Assizes, he would have been found not guilty. The Home Secretary also ordered that the bodies of Ann and Walter Palmer be exhumed and re-examined; Walter was too badly decomposed, though Dr. Taylor found antimony in all the organs in Ann's body.

Palmer's defence was led by Mr Serjeant William Shee. Their case suffered adverse comment from the judge because Shee had, against all rules and conventions of professional conduct, told the jury that he personally believed Palmer to be innocent. The prosecution team of Alexander Cockburn and John Walter Huddleston possessed fine forensic minds and proved forceful advocates, especially in demolishing the testimony of defence witness Jeremiah Smith, who had insisted that he had no knowledge of Palmer's taking out life insurance on his brother, despite Smith's signature being on the form. Palmer expressed his admiration for Cockburn's cross-examination after the verdict through the racing metaphor, "It was the riding that did it."

Circumstantial evidence came to light:

- Elizabeth Mills said that as Cook was dying, he accused Palmer of murder.
- Charles Newton told the jury that he had seen Palmer purchasing strychnine.
- Chemist Dr. Salt admitted selling Palmer strychnine in the belief that he was using it to poison a dog. He also admitted that he had failed to record the sale in his poisons book as required by law.
- Charles Roberts, another chemist, also admitted selling Palmer strychnine without noting the sale in his poisons book.

Palmer's financial situation was also explained, with Pratt telling the court he lent money to the accused at 60% interest, and bank manager Mr Stawbridge confirming that Palmer's bank balance had stood at £9 on 3 November 1855.

The cause of Cook's death was hotly disputed, with each side bringing out medical witnesses. Few witnesses actually had any experience in human cases of strychnine poisoning, and their testimony would have been considered weak by 21st-century standards.

- Dr. Bamford was ill, and his stated cause as congestion of the brain was dismissed by other witnesses; the prosecution told the jury that he had become mentally suspect in his old age.
- The prosecution witnesses, including Dr. Taylor, stated the cause of death as "tetanus due to strychnine".
- Shee summed up his case to the jury by stating that, if the prosecution were correct: "Never therefore, were circumstances more favourable for detection of the poison and yet none was found." He summoned fifteen medical witnesses who stated that the poison should have been found in the stomach (the contents of which had disappeared during the post-mortem).

The prosecution had the last word, and an image was painted of Palmer as a man desperately in need of money in order to avoid debtors' prison, who murdered his friend for his money and who had covered his tracks by sabotaging the post-mortem. The jury deliberated for just over an hour before returning a verdict of guilty. Lord Campbell sentenced Palmer to death, to no reaction from Palmer.

== Execution ==
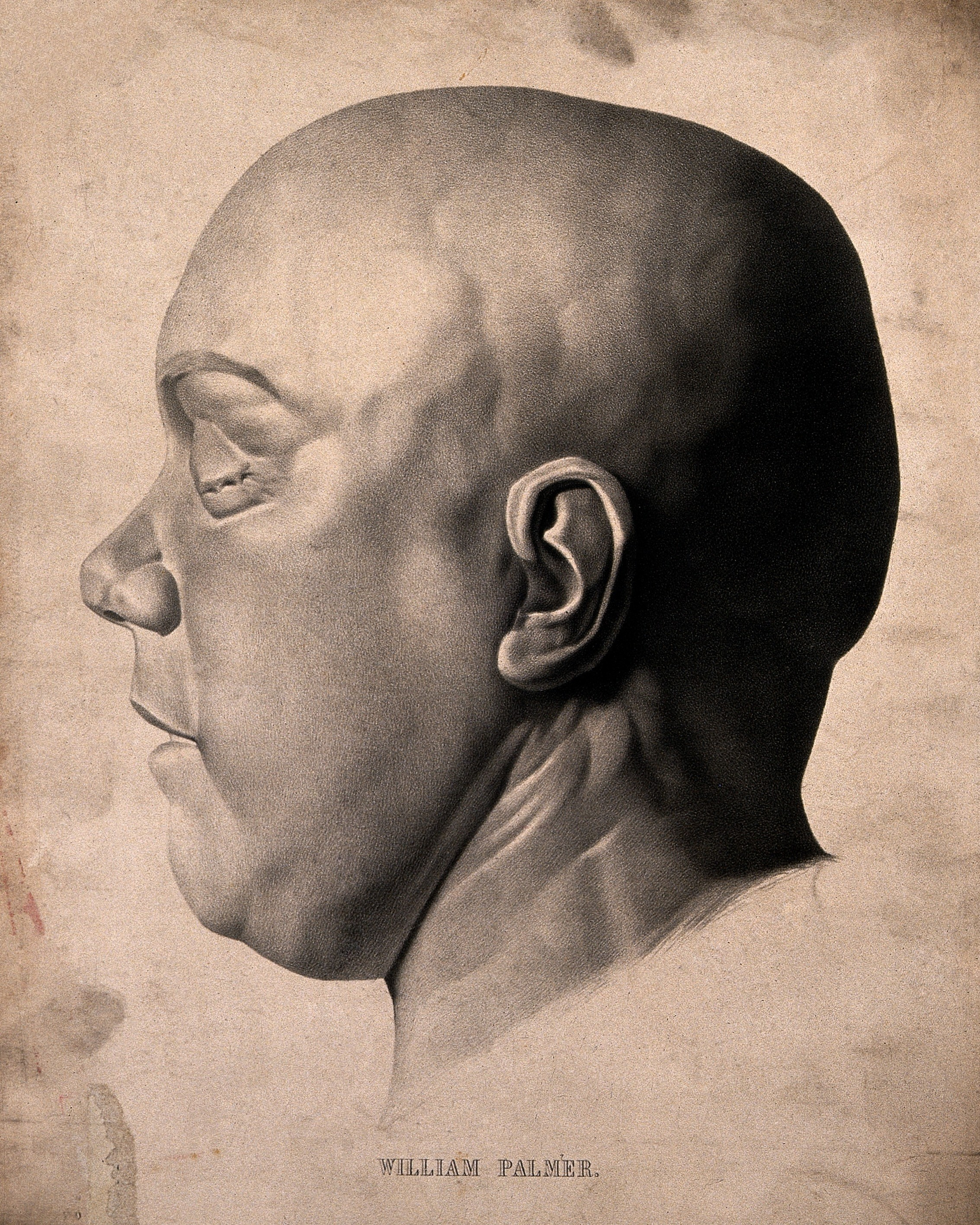
Lithograph of a death mask of William Palmer

Approximately 30,000 people were at Stafford Gaol on 14 June 1856 to see Palmer's public hanging by executioner George Smith. As he stepped onto the gallows, Palmer is said to have looked at the trapdoor and exclaimed, "Are you sure it's safe?"

The prison governor asked Palmer to confess his guilt before the end, which resulted in the following exchange of words:

"Cook did not die from strychnine."
"This is no time for quibbling – did you, or did you not, kill Cook?"
"The Lord Chief Justice summed up for poisoning by strychnine."

Palmer was buried beside the prison chapel in a grave filled with quicklime. After he was hanged his mother is said to have commented: "They have hanged my saintly Billy." Shortly after the execution, a newspaper reported:

It is stated that the rope that hanged Palmer is selling in Lockmaben, Dumfrieshire, at 5s. per inch. The seller is a man from Dudley, where Smith the hangman resides. The 'interesting relic,' it is said, meets with ready purchasers. The rope has also been selling extensively in England, it is said, and of course is being spun as the demand for it increases.

Some scholars believe that the evidence should not have been enough to convict Palmer, and that the summing up of the judge was prejudicial. On 20 May 1946, the Staffordshire Sentinel published a final piece of evidence not included in the trial, found by Mrs E. Smith, widow of the former coroner for South West London; it was a prescription for opium written in Palmer's handwriting, on the reverse of which was a chemist's bill for 10d worth of strychnine and opium.

== Cultural references ==
A wax effigy of Palmer was displayed in the Chamber of Horrors at Madame Tussaud's waxwork museum from 1857 until 1979.

In the Sherlock Holmes short story "The Adventure of the Speckled Band" (1892), referring to the villain who is a doctor, Holmes tells Watson that when a doctor goes bad he is "the first of criminals", then mentions Palmer and Edward William Pritchard as examples.

The incident involving Palmer at the autopsy of Cook is glancingly referred to in Dorothy L. Sayers's 1928 murder mystery novel The Unpleasantness at the Bellona Club.

William Palmer was portrayed by actor Jay Novello on the CBS radio series Crime Classics in the 7 October 1953 episode entitled "The Hangman and William Palmer, Who Won?"

Robert Graves's final historical novel, They Hanged My Saintly Billy (1957), defends Palmer, offering Graves's trademark "reconstruction of a damaged or maligned reputation" (p. xxv).

The film The Life and Crimes of William Palmer was released in 1998, with Keith Allen playing the part of Palmer.

== See also ==
- John Bodkin Adams (a doctor suspected of murder for financial gain)
- Thomas Neill Cream (aka the Lambeth Poisoner, a doctor who murdered with poison)
- Harold Shipman (a doctor convicted of 15 murders, but suspected of some 250 murders)
- Michael Swango (a physician suspected of poisoning around 60 people)
- List of serial killers by country

== Bibliography ==
- Barker, G. F. R. (2004) "Shee, Sir William (1804–1868)", rev. Hugh Mooney, Oxford Dictionary of National Biography, Oxford University Press, accessed 24 July 2007 (subscription, Wikipedia Library access or UK public library membership required)
- Bates, Stephen (2014) The Poisoner: The Life and Crimes of Victorian England's Most Notorious Doctor, Overlook, ISBN 978-1468309119
- Davenport-Hines, R. (2004) "Palmer, William [ the Rugeley Poisoner] (1824–1856)", Oxford Dictionary of National Biography, Oxford University Press, accessed 20 July 2007 (subscription, Wikipedia Library access or UK public library membership required)
- Knott, G. H. (1912). The Trial of William Palmer (Notable English Trials ed.). Edinburgh: William Hodge & Co.
- The Trial of William Palmer for the Alleged Rugeley Poisonings. London: James Gilbert. 1856.
- McCormick, Ian. (Ed.) Antigua, Penny, Puce AND They Hanged My Saintly Billy. London Carcanet Press, 2003.
- Graves, Robert "They hanged my saintly Billy". Cassell and Co, London 1957
