= A. C. Smith & Co. Gas Station =

- U.S. National Register of Historic Places
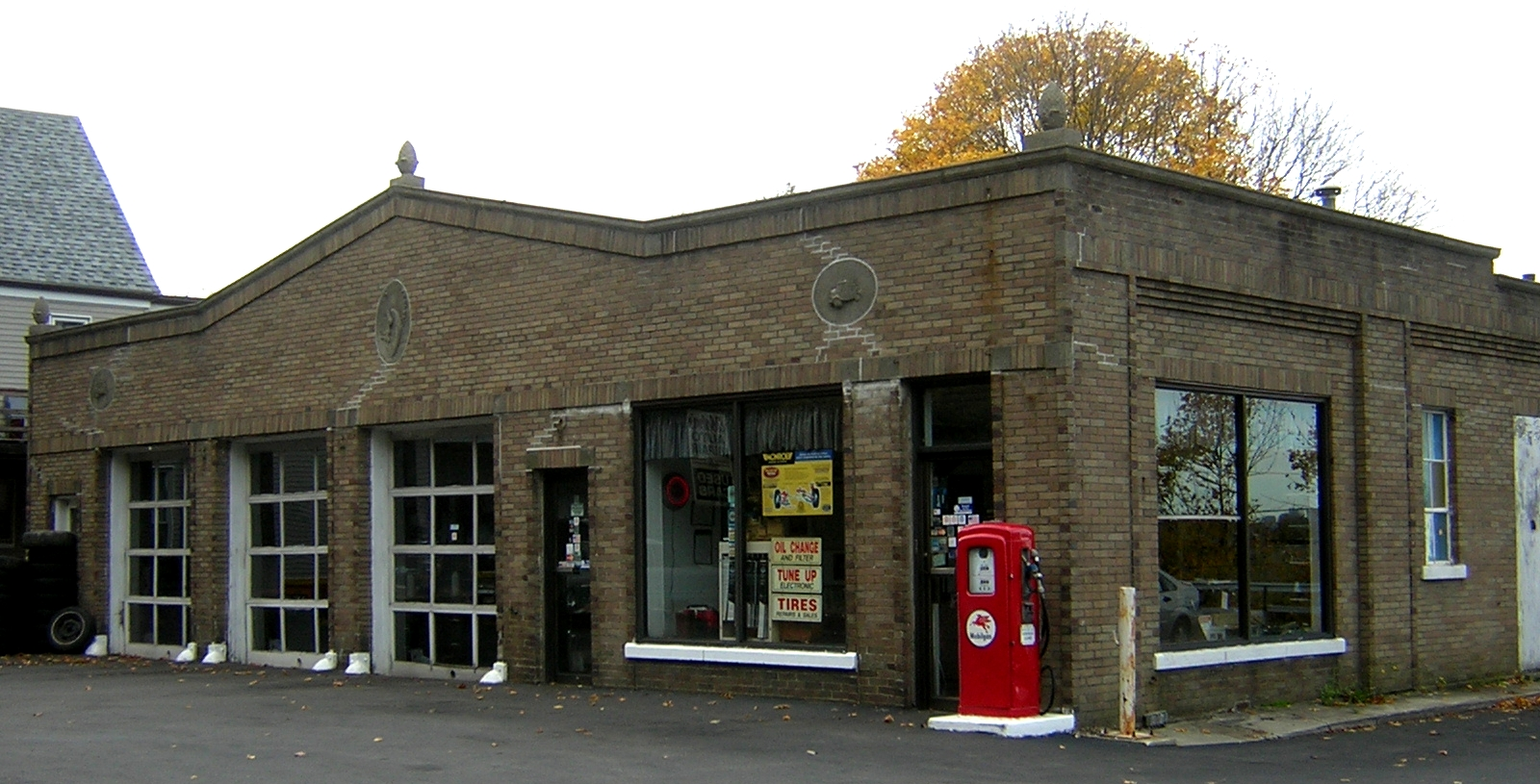

- Location within Massachusetts Location within the United States
- Location: 117 Beale St., Quincy, Massachusetts
- Coordinates: 42°15′54″N 71°1′14.5″W
- Built: 1926
- Architect: Batty and Gallagher
- Architectural style: Early Commercial
- MPS: Quincy MRA
- NRHP reference No.: 94000036
- Added to NRHP: February 23, 1994

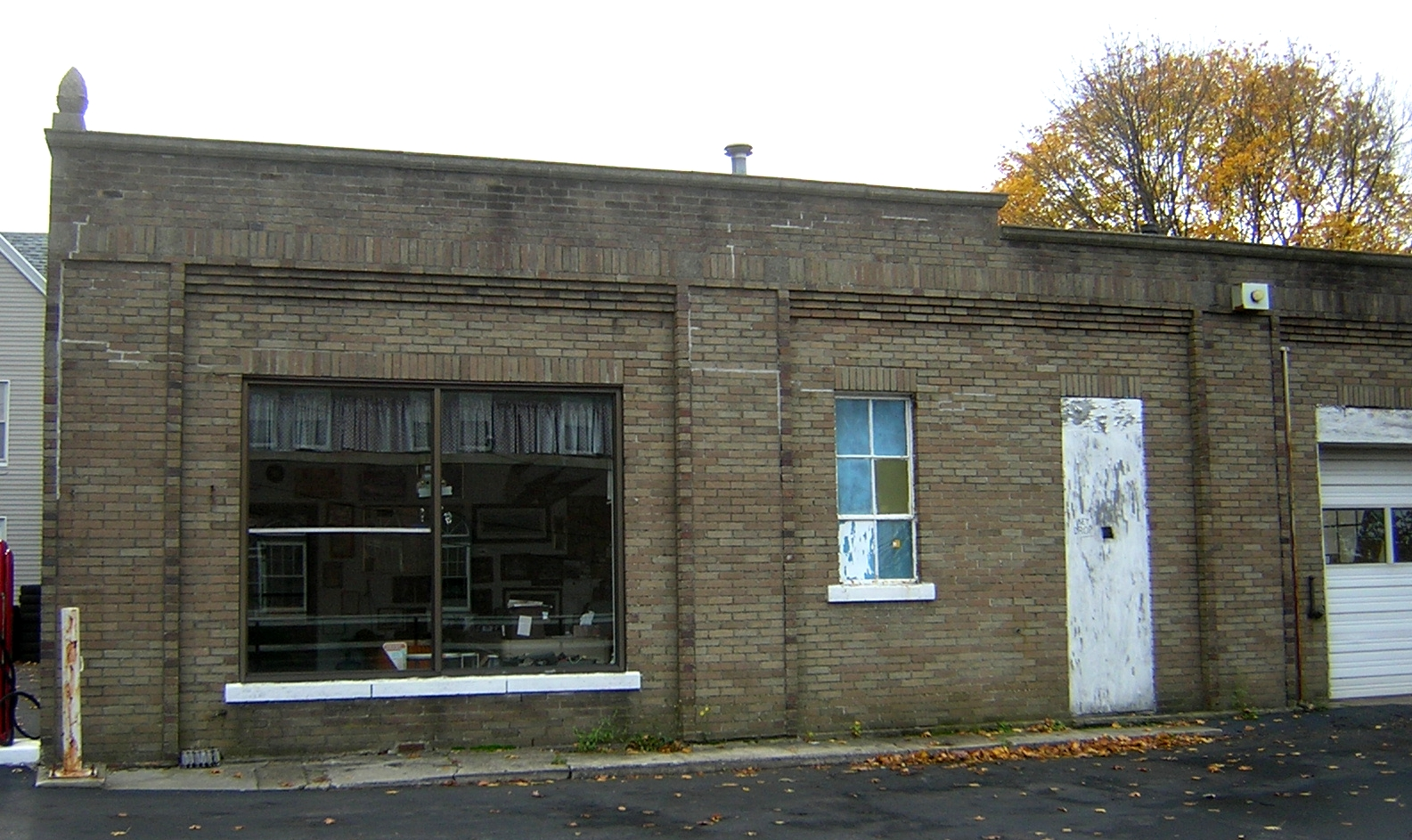

The A. C. Smith & Co. Gas Station is a historic gas station at 117 Beale Street in Quincy, Massachusetts. It is a single-story brick, with a front facade divided into three vehicle bays on the left and an office on the right, with a pedestrian entrance to the work area in between. A low-pitch gable at the center acts a kind of parapet, and there are round decorative panels on the front facade. The building was constructed in 1926, and is a little-altered example of an early functional automotive filling and service station. Its original brickwork remains in good condition, and its service bays are distinctively illuminated in part by original skylights.

The building was listed on the National Register of Historic Places in 1994.

== See also ==
- National Register of Historic Places listings in Quincy, Massachusetts
