= Greg Parma Smith =

Greg Parma Smith (born 1983, Cambridge, Massachusetts) is a New York-based painter. He is known for his precise painterly realism, which incorporates elements of academic figuration, representational painting, neo-pop, and appropriation art.

In his work Smith samples the iconography of comics, neoclassical nudes, graffiti, Song Dynasty literati painting, and trompe l’oeil arabesques. As described in MAY No.17, Smith critiques “the way in which subcultures are brought into a dominant domain” by highlighting “exploitative taboos long repressed and smoothed over in so-called high-low narratives in advanced art."

== Exhibitions ==
Greg Parma Smith's work has been shown at Musée d’art moderne et contemporain (MAMCO), Genève; Galerie Francesca Pia, Zürich; David Lewis Gallery, New York; Balice Hertling, Paris; Balice Hertling & Lewis, New York; VAVA, Milan; Everest/Foundation Gutzwiller, Zurich; Contemporary Art Museum, St. Louis; Swiss Institute, New York; MoMA PS1, New York; Kiev Biennial, The School of Kyiv, Ukraine; White Columns, New York; Metro Pictures, New York; Blum and Poe, Los Angeles; Greene Naftali, New York; Miguel Abreu Gallery, New York; and Daniel Reich Gallery, New York; among others.

== Collections ==
Smith's work is featured in the collection of the Cleveland Museum of Art and Musée d’art moderne et contemporain (MAMCO), Genève.

== Publications ==
The artist's first monographic catalog was co-published by JRP-Rignier and Musée d’art moderne et contemporain (MAMCO) on occasion of the exhibition Greg Parma Smith in 2017.
