= George Smith (priest) =

Archdeacon of Madras (1926–1929)

George Cecil Augustus Smith (1877–1964) was Archdeacon of Madras from 1926 to 1929.

Smith was educated at Durham University and ordained in 1902. After curacies in Armley and Hellesdon he went with the Eccles Establishment to India. He served at Ootacamund, Trichinopoly, Bellary, George Town, Chennai and Bangalore. Returning from India in 1931, he held incumbencies at Kingston, Courteenhall and South Newton.
