= Albert Smith (cricketer) =

English cricketer

Personal information
- Full name: Albert Smith
- Born: Q2 1863; Mexborough, Yorkshire, England
- Died: Unknown
- Batting: Unknown
- Bowling: Slow left-arm orthodox

Domestic team information
- Years: Team
- 1895: Cheshire

Career statistics
Competition	First-class
Matches	2
Runs scored	38
Batting average	9.50
100s/50s	–/–
Top score	21
Balls bowled	263
Wickets	7
Bowling average	24.28
5 wickets in innings	–
10 wickets in match	–
Best bowling	4/57
Catches/stumpings	1/–
- Source: CricketArchive, 12 October 2015

Albert Smith (Q2 1863 – date of death unknown) was an English cricketer active in first-class cricket in 1894, making two appearances.

Born at Mexborough, Yorkshire, Smith was a slow left-arm orthodox bowler who made his debut in first-class cricket when he was selected to play for the Liverpool and District cricket team against Yorkshire at Aigburth. His second appearance of 1894 came against Cambridge University, also at Aigburth. He scored a total of 38 runs in his two matches, with a highest score of 21. With the ball he took 7 wickets, which came at an average of 24.28, with best figures of 4/57. He later made two appearances for Cheshire in the 1895 Minor Counties Championship against Staffordshire and Worcestershire.
