= George Smith (sportsman) =

American baseball and basketball player

- Born: March 2, 1927; Princeton, Kentucky
- Died: October 1, 2011 (aged 84); Indianapolis, Indiana

Professional debut
- Baseball: 1948, for the Harlem Globetrotters
- Basketball: 1948, for the Harlem Globetrotters

Last appearance
- Baseball: 1952, for the Chicago American Giants
- Basketball: 1954, for the Harlem Globetrotters

Teams
- Baseball: Harlem Globetrotters (1948–1950); Chicago American Giants (1951–1952); Basketball: Harlem Globetrotters (1948–1954)

George E. Smith (March 2, 1927 – October 1, 2011), nicknamed "Sonny," was a sportsman who played Negro league baseball for the Harlem Globetrotters from 1948 to 1950 and the Chicago American Giants of the Negro American League from 1951 to 1952.

He also played basketball as a guard and forward for the Harlem Globetrotters from 1948 to 1954. He is the uncle of former NBA player Greg Smith (disambiguation).
