= George Edward Smith =

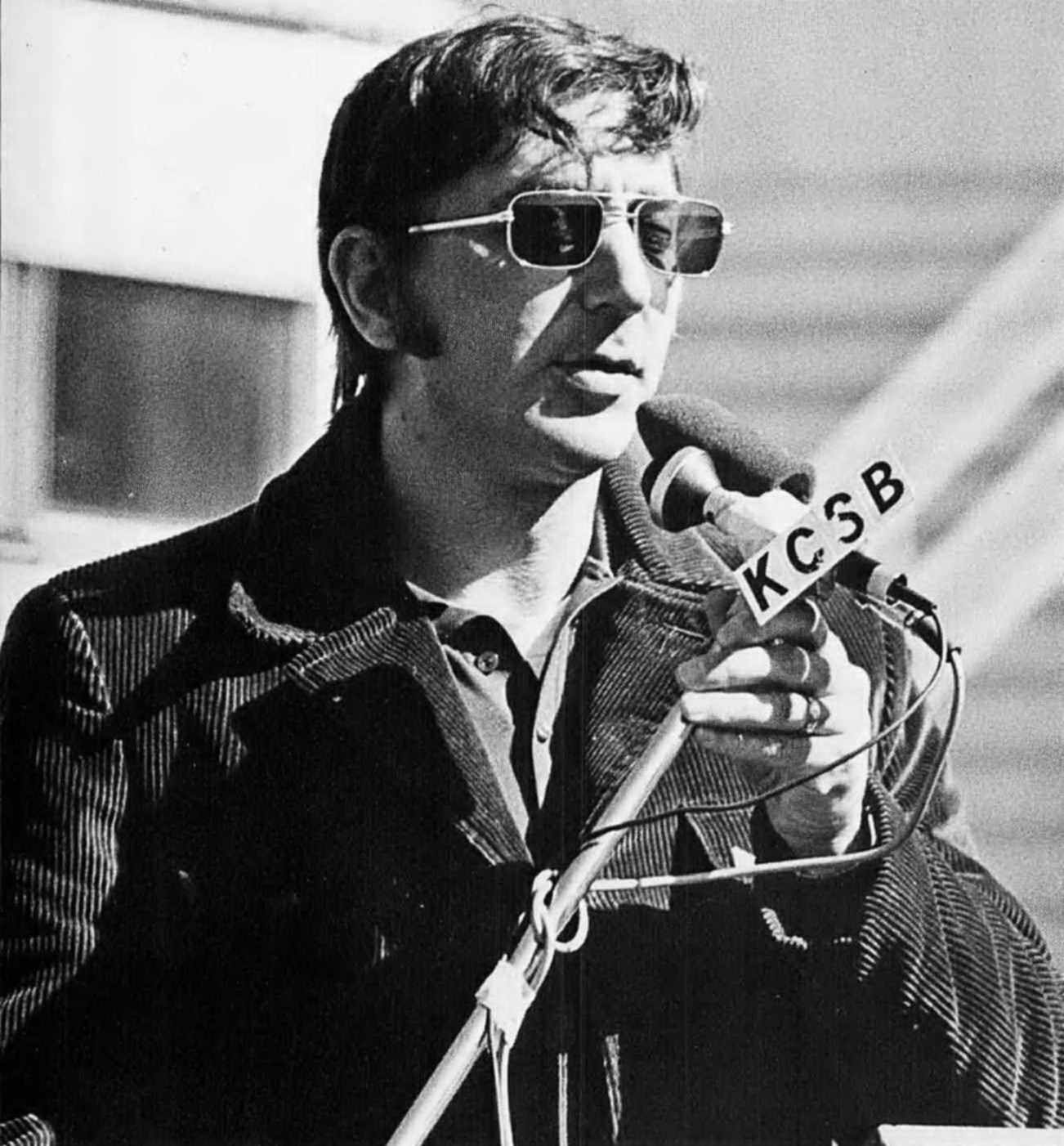
- Smith speaks at the University of California, Santa Barbara, November 13, 1972
- Born: 1938 (age 87–88)
- Military career
- Allegiance: United States of America
- Branch: United States Army Special Forces
- Service years: 1955 - 1966
- Rank: Staff Sergeant
- Nickname: "Smitty"
- Units: Detachment A-21, Company B, 5th Special Forces Group
- Conflicts: Hiep Hoa
- Other work: Author - P.O.W.:Two Years with the Vietcong

George Edward "Smitty" Smith (born 1938) is a U.S. Army veteran of the Vietnam War, former prisoner of war, and author.

Captured with other members of his sA- Team, November 24, 1963, he was released two years later in Cambodia. He later wrote about his experiences in a book titled P.O.W.:Two Years with the Vietcong, published by Ramparts Press in 1971. It is a first person account of United States Army Special Forces Sergeant George Smith's two years as a prisoner of war. He traveled and lived with the Vietcong as their prisoner in a series of jungle camps, and developed a detailed understanding of life in the National Liberation Front's safe areas and the people he called VC.

Smith was a part of the Indochina Peace Campaign, with Tom Hayden, Jane Fonda, and hundreds of thousands of others.
