= George W. Smith (judge) =

American judge

George Washington Smith (1820s–October 24, 1873) was a justice of the Supreme Court of Texas from August 1866 to September 1867.

He died of yellow fever at his home in Colorado County, Texas.

Political offices
Preceded by Asa H. Willie	Justice of the Texas Supreme Court; 1866–1867	Succeeded by Court restructured
