= G. C. Moore Smith =

George Charles Moore Smith, FBA (3 September 1858 – 7 November 1940) was an English literary scholar. A graduate from St John's College, Cambridge, he was an extension lecturer for the University of Cambridge before spending the rest of his career as Professor of English at the University of Sheffield and its predecessors the University College, Sheffield, and Firth College (1896–1924). He was the university's honorary librarian from 1896 to 1907, and amassed over 10,000 works for its collections. He was elected a fellow of the British Academy in 1933, received the LittD from the University of Cambridge in 1907, and honorary doctorates from three other universities. He was the subject of a Festschrift in 1928.
