= George W. Smith (footballer) =

Scottish footballer

Personal information
- Full name: George Westwater Smith
- Date of birth: Jun 6 1898
- Place of birth: Wishaw, Scotland
- Date of death: Sep 4 1987
- Place of death: Lanark, Scotland
- Height: 5 ft 9 1/2 in (1.77 m)
- Position: Full back

Senior career*
Years	Team	Apps	(Gls)
- Parkhead
1921–1932	Chelsea	351	(0)
1932	East Fife	9	(0)
- * Club domestic league appearances and goals

George Westwater Smith (6 June 1898, Wishaw – 4 September 1987, Lanark) was a Scottish footballer who played as a full back in the English Football League in the 1920s and 1930s.

Born in Parkhead, Glasgow, he started out with his local side Parkhead F.C., before enjoying a long career with Chelsea.

Smith joined Chelsea in 1921 and went on to play 351 league matches for them (370 in all senior games) until 1932. Whilst at the club, he played in three FA Cup games where Chelsea defeated opposition from a higher league.

After leaving Chelsea he played for Scottish side East Fife for a matter of a few months.
