= George C. Smith (Mississippi politician) =

Mississippi politician

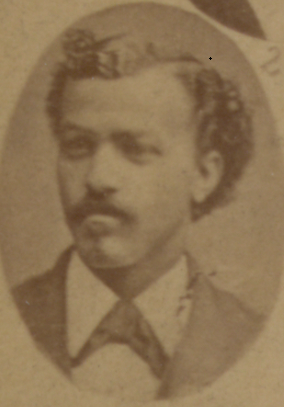

George C. Smith was a superintendent of education and state legislator in Mississippi.

He was born in Ohio. He represented Coahoma County in the Mississippi Senate from 1874 to 1875. He was a Republican.

His account of political intimidation and violence at Friars Point was reported in a newspaper.

== See also ==
- African American officeholders from the end of the Civil War until before 1900
