= George Albert =

George Albert may refer to:

- George Albert, Margrave of Brandenburg-Kulmbach (1619–1666), German prince
- George Albert, Prince of East Frisia (1690–1734), member of the family of the Cirksena and the fourth Prince of East Frisia
- George Albert, Prince of Schwarzburg-Rudolstadt (1838–1890), penultimate sovereign prince of Schwarzburg-Rudolstadt
- George Albert I, Count of Erbach-Schönberg (1597–1647)
- George Albert II, Count of Erbach-Fürstenau (1648–1717)
- George Albert II, Margrave of Brandenburg (1591–1615)
- George Albert III, Count of Erbach-Fürstenau (1731–1778)
