= School of Medicine, Medical Sciences and Nutrition, University of Aberdeen =

Medical school in Aberdeen City, Scotland

Coordinates: 57.1564°N 2.1343°W

- Type: Medical school, Dental school, Research Institutes
- Established: 1497; 529 years ago
- Interim Head of School: Professor David Blackbourn
- Students: ~ 850
- Location: Aberdeen, Scotland
- Campus: Foresterhill Campus
- Affiliations: University of Aberdeen
- Website: The School of Medicine, Medical Science and Nutrition

The School of Medicine, Medical Sciences and Nutrition is the Medical school and Dental school at the University of Aberdeen in Scotland. It also provides training and carries out research in medical sciences, nutrition, public health, dentistry, health sciences, physician associate studies at BSc, MSc, and PhD levels. The current school was formed from the merger of the former School of Medicine & Dentistry, School of Medical Sciences, and the Rowett Institute of Nutrition.

Medicine has been taught at the university since the founding of King's College in 1495. The formal establishment of a medical school supporting a broad curriculum appears to postdate 1787 when there were calls "for the establishment of a medical school" in Aberdeen.

The medical school in 2025 was ranked 1st in the UK by The Guardian University Guide and 10th by The Times University Guide. It also ranked within the top 200 in the world by both the Times Higher Education World University Rankings and the QS World University Rankings in the same year.

== Education ==
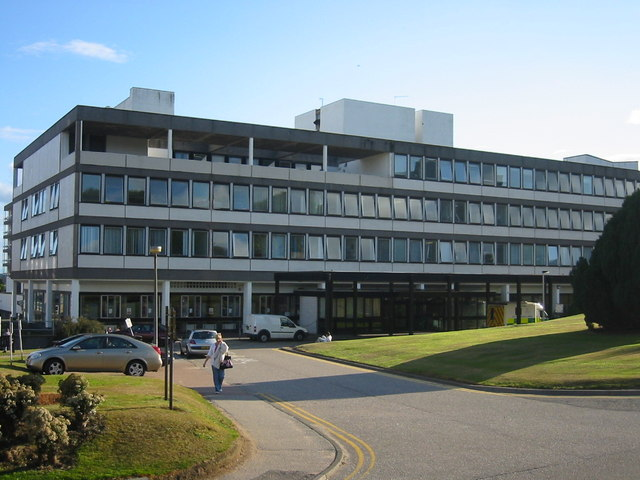
Surgical wards at Aberdeen Royal Infirmary

The Institute of Education for Healthcare & Medical Sciences is part of the School of Medicine, Medical Sciences and Nutrition. It is responsible for all of the education and teaching activities of the School. Its current director is Prof Colin Lumsden, a paediatrician. Scholarship-focused academic staff within the school mostly fall within this institute. The school's education and teaching activities take place across both the Foresterhill Medical Campus, the university's main Old Aberdeen Campus, and Aberdeen Sports Village.

=== Institutes ===
- Institute of Applied Health Sciences
- Institute of Education in Healthcare & Medical Sciences
- Institute of Dentistry
- Institute of Medical Sciences
- Rowett Institute

=== Units and centres ===
- Centre for Rural Health
- Dugald Baird Centre for Research on Women's Health
- Health Economics Research Unit
- Aberdeen Centre for Evaluation (previously known as the Health Services Research Unit)

== Locations ==
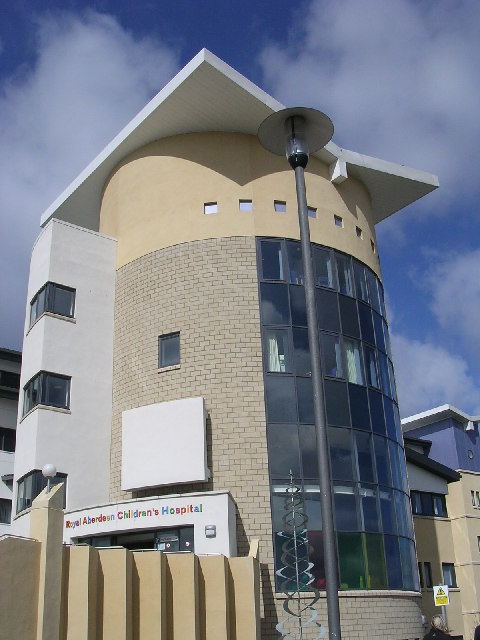
The Royal Aberdeen Children's Hospital, one of the school's teaching hospitals

Today, the school is based in the Polwarth Building on the Foresterhill campus in Aberdeen, as well as the Suttie Centre for Teaching & Learning, the Institute of Medical Science, Dental Institute, Biomedical Physics Building, Health Science Building, Polwarth Building, Rowett Institute (all on the Foresterhill Campus) and in the Centre for Health Science in Inverness. Laboratory and science teaching also takes place in Foresterhill and Old Aberdeen, with a new Science Teaching Hub recently opened for the use of science students. Undergraduate clinical placements are mainly in hospitals but also in general practice and community settings. The variety of placements offered, both within Aberdeen and in other locations in the Highlands and Islands, allows students to gain experience of both inner-city medicine and to see how healthcare is delivered in areas far removed from large teaching centres.

The main teaching hospitals are in Aberdeen: Aberdeen Royal Infirmary, Aberdeen Maternity Hospital, the Royal Aberdeen Children's Hospital, Woodend Hospital and the Royal Cornhill Hospital.

Teaching is also provided in Inverness: mainly at Raigmore Hospital and also New Craigs Hospital. Elgin: at Dr Gray's Hospital. In Fort William: Belford Hospital. In Stornoway, Isle of Lewis: Western Isles Hospital. In Kirkwall, Orkney: Balfour Hospital. In Lerwick, Shetland: Gilbert Bain Hospital. In Wick: Caithness General Hospital

Undergraduate medical science courses are offered in physiology, pharmacology, neuroscience, anatomy, biochemistry, molecular biology, genetics, immunology, developmental biology, and sport science. Optional courses include an industrial placement and biobusiness training.

== People ==
The Interim Head of School is Professor David Blackbourn. There are four active Regius Professorships, in Medicine, Physiology, Surgery and Anatomy. The Regius Chair of Midwifery is in abeyance.

== Courses ==
The University of Aberdeen offers undergraduate courses in medicine (MB ChB), dentistry (BDS) and BSc programmes in Medical Sciences. In 2018, the school had an intake of 184 students to study medicine; of these 18 came from outside the UK.

Aberdeen offers a five-year MBChB programme, leading to the award of the degrees of Bachelor of Medicine and Bachelor of Surgery, MB ChB. The course uses a systems-based, integrated approach to teaching.

The school offers the opportunity to undertake a further year of study to gain an intercalated BSc (Hons) in Medical Sciences or Medical Humanities.

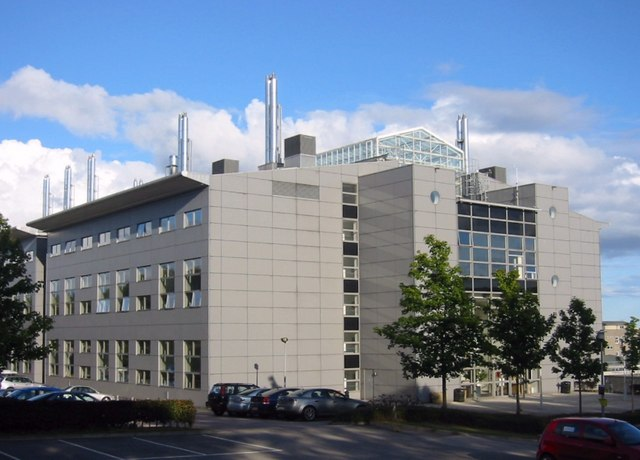
The Institute of Medical Sciences, where medical science research is performed

The school also offers a large variety of postgraduate degrees, including Applied Health Sciences, Master in Public Health, Global Health and Management, Human Nutrition, Clinical Nutrition, Health Economics for Health Professionals, Health Psychology, Medical Sciences, Molecular Medicine, Microbiology, Immunology and Immunotherapy, Cardiovascular Science and Diabetes, Reproductive and Developmental Biology, Biotechnology, Bioinformatics and Bio-business, Microbiology, Medical Physics, Medical Imaging, Industrial Biotechnology, Clinical Pharmacology, Drug Discovery and Development, Precision Medicine and Pharmacological Innovation, Advanced Clinical Practice, Clinical Education, Special Care Dentistry, Advanced Restorative Dental Practice and Physician Associate programmes. Postgraduate degrees are offered as taught courses, generally leading to the degree of Master of Science (MSc), and as research degrees either at a master's (MSc, MRes, ChM) level or at doctoral (PhD, MD) level.

=== Medical Society (Medsoc) ===
Aberdeen Medsoc was a society set-up originally to bring medical students together in a social capacity. It is the oldest Aberdeen University Student Society and today it has over 600 members. Annual social activities include Beerienteering, Medsoc Ball, Doctors v Medics Sports Day, Medsoc Revue and most recently a Fashion Show with proceeds going to a local children's charity.

There are a range of societies and groups that are open to medical and dental students, catering for a variety of interests.

== Famous alumni ==
- Robert Brown – discoverer of Brownian motion
- Sir Graeme Catto — president of the General Medical Council
- John Macleod — co-discoverer of insulin and Nobel Prize winner
- Sir Patrick Manson — "Father of Tropical Medicine"
- Professor Alex Mowat – pioneer of paediatric hepatology
- Sir Alexander Ogston — discoverer of Staphylococcus aureus
- The Very Reverend Gordon McPhate – Dean of Chester Cathedral
- Surgeon Major Peter Shepherd – pioneer of first aid for civilians.
- William Heath Strange - founder of the Hampstead General Hospital, now the Royal Free Hospital
