= Woolmanhill Hospital =

Former hospital in Aberdeen, Scotland

- NHS Grampian
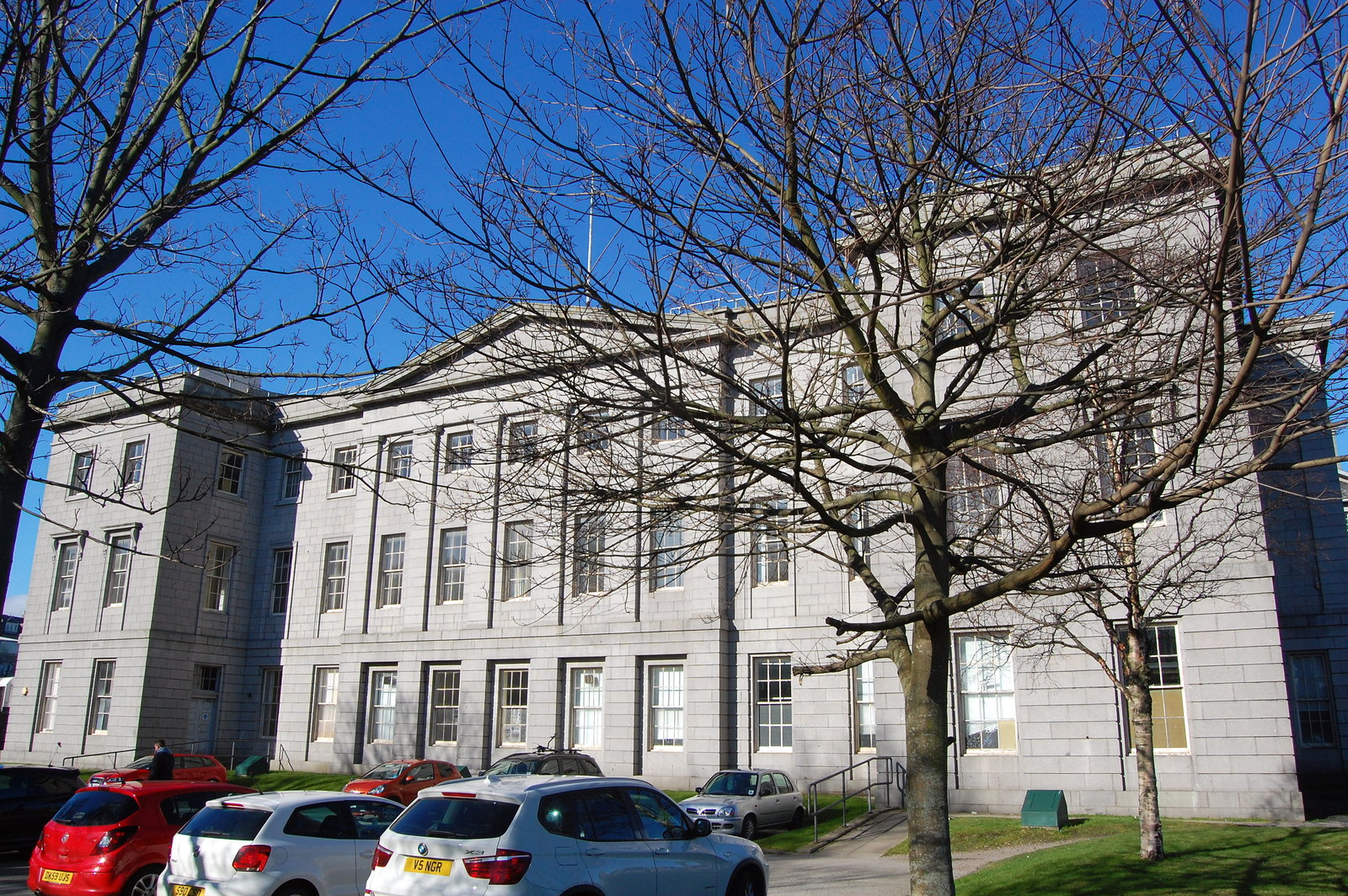
- Woolmanhill Hospital

- Shown in Aberdeen

Geography
- Location: Aberdeen, Grampian, Scotland, United Kingdom
- Coordinates: 57.1493°N 2.1059°W

Organisation
- Care system: NHS Scotland
- Type: Teaching
- Affiliated university: University of Aberdeen; Robert Gordon University; Queen Margaret University (Audiology Department only)

Services
- Emergency department: No Accident & Emergency

History
- Founded: 1742
- Closed: 2017

Links
- Website: Woolmanhill Hospital- NHS Grampian
- Lists: Hospitals in Scotland

Listed Building – Category A
- Official name: Simpson Pavilion
- Designated: 25 May 1977
- Reference no.: LB19995

Woolmanhill Hospital was a health facility in the city centre of Aberdeen, Scotland. It was the original Aberdeen Royal Infirmary, a complex which opened in 1749 and was replaced by new facility at Foresterhill in 1936. After services transferred to Aberdeen Community Health and Care Village, the Foresterhill site and Woodend Hospital, the Woolmanhill Hospital closed in April 2017. The complex is centred on a neo-classical main block with later nineteenth century buildings to the rear. Unusually, it has remained largely complete, with later building having taken place at Foresterhill. It was managed by NHS Grampian.

== History ==
=== Early history and development ===
The facility was conceived as the original Aberdeen Royal Infirmary, before it moved to the Foresterhill site. Work began on the original building on the site, designed by William Christall, in 1740 and it opened in 1742.

The facility, was rebuilt to a design by Aberdeen architect, Archibald Simpson, in the neo-classical style, between 1833 and 1840 at the cost of £17,000. The main building, known as the Simpson Pavilion, is one of the last surviving examples of a pre-Nightingale style of hospital design. Additions were made to the building in 1844 and following a fire in 1849 it was repaired and subsequently extended.

In 1887, new buildings, designed by W. & J. Smith & Kelly were constructed to the north of the site. This Jubilee Extension provided a new surgical block, medical and pathology block and laundry blocks. The 1840 building was converted into an administrative and clinical area and also provided accommodation for nurses. The mid nineteenth century additions to the Simpson Pavilion were removed as part of this extension work.

After the First World War, further expansion was required but the confined nature of the site made this impractical and in 1923 the site at Foresterhill was acquired. Most services transferred to the Foresterhill site in 1936. Nevertheless, some departments continued to operate from the facility which was renamed the "Woolmanhill Hospital". The building was designated a Category A listed building on 25 May 1977.

=== Closure ===
In 1999, NHS Grampian was granted permission to close the hospital and, by 2000, there were no in-patient beds remaining at the hospital.

A phased closure began as departments moved to various locations in Aberdeen, including the new Aberdeen Community Health and Care Village, the Foresterhill site and Woodend Hospital. Departments such as physiotherapy, genito-urinary medicine and osteoporosis moved out in 2012. Adult diabetic services moved to the David Anderson Building on Foresterhill site in May 2013.

After the ear, nose and throat (ENT) and audiology departments, which were the last services operating there, moved to Woodend Hospital, the hospital finally closed in April 2017.

=== Redevelopment ===
In February 2016, plans were revealed to convert the Simpson Pavilion into a 52-bed hotel and the buildings into 42 serviced apartments. These plans were approved by the council and work was expected to start in 2019.
