= Cottage hospital =

Type of small hospital

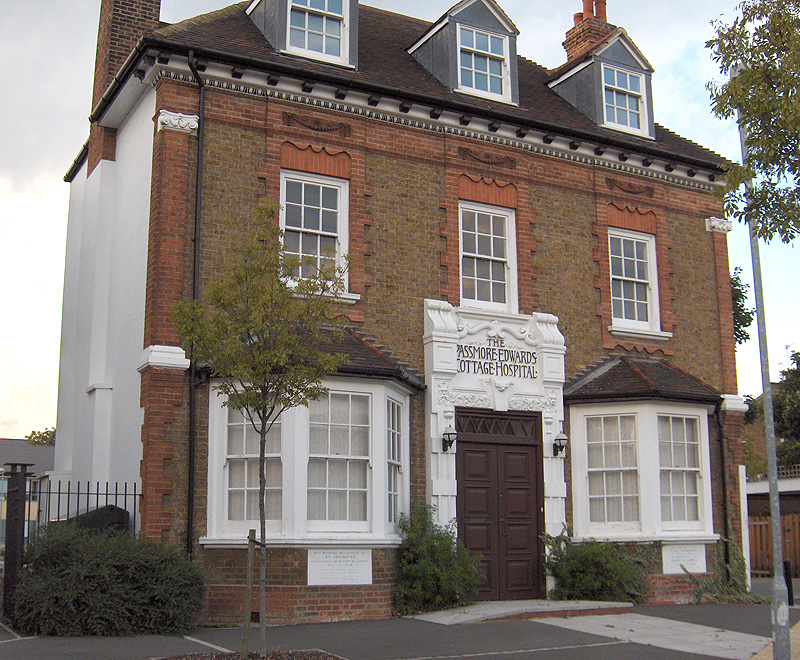
Passmore Edwards Cottage Hospital in Acton, London. Built c. 1900, it was funded by John Passmore Edwards.

A cottage hospital is a mostly obsolete type of small hospital, most commonly found in the United Kingdom.

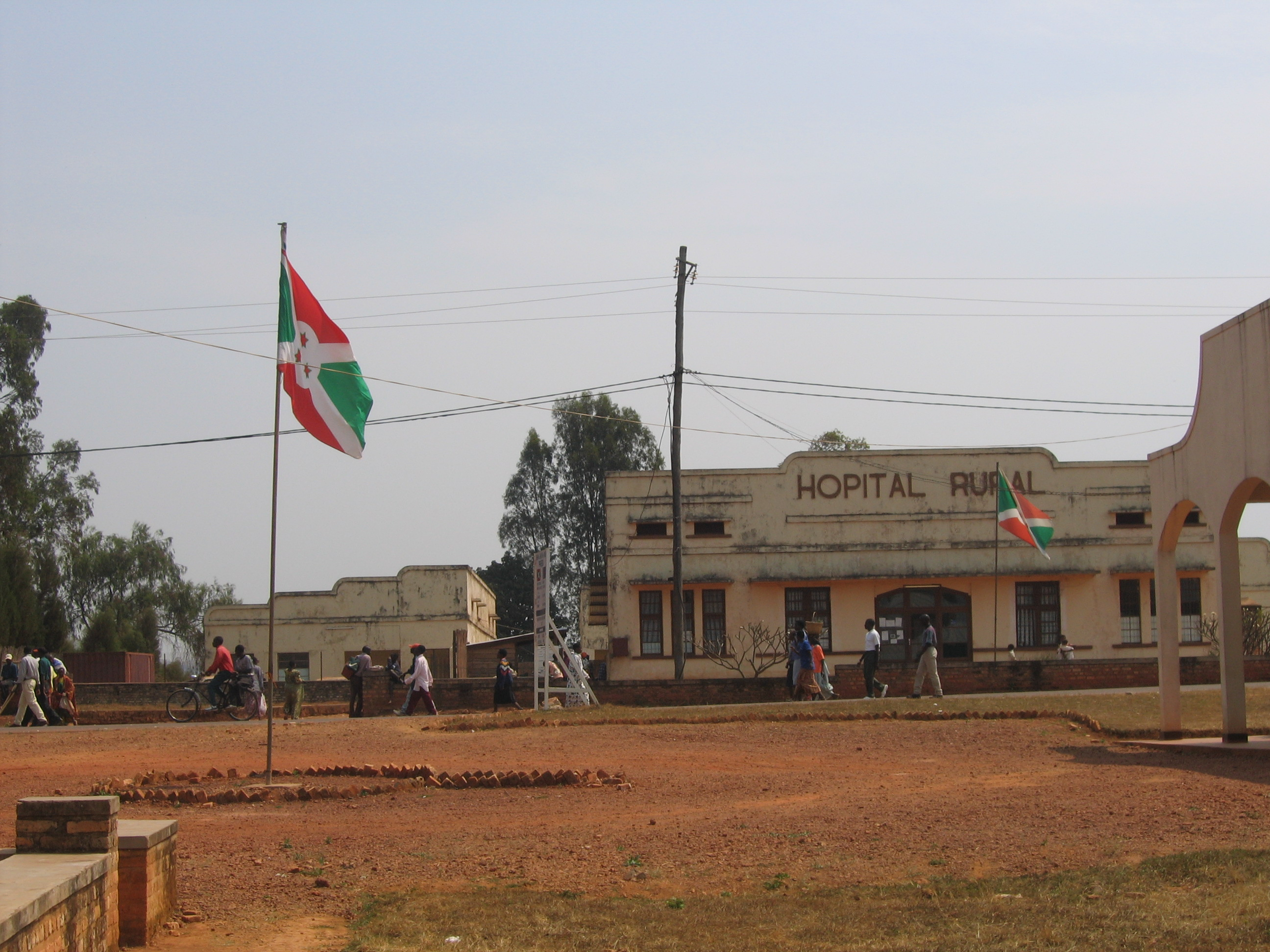
A cottage hospital in Ruyigi, Burundi

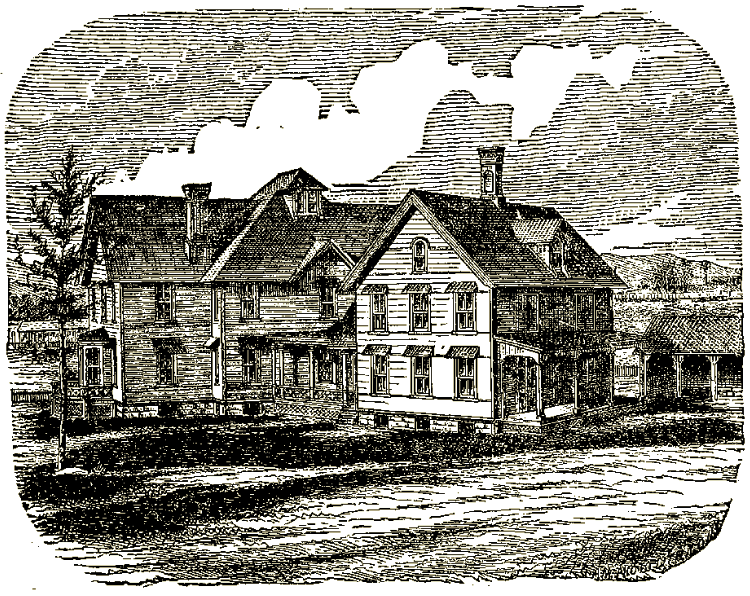
House of Mercy (Pittsfield, Massachusetts), first cottage hospital in the U.S.

The original concept was a small rural building having several beds. The advantages of such a hospital in villages were the provision of care which avoided long journeys to county or voluntary hospitals, facilities to deal more immediately with emergencies, and familiarity the local physician might have with their patients that may affect their treatment. This local knowledge of the patient would probably have been lost had they been referred to their nearest county hospital, as was typical for poorer patients.

Some of these buildings continued to be known as cottage hospitals until recent times. In particular, several are still recognisable in Scotland within the infrastructure of NHS Grampian, Kirkcudbrightshire, Dumfries & Galloway, and in Norfolk and Suffolk in England, an example being the Aldeburgh Cottage Hospital, which is still working as a traditional cottage hospital. The term community hospital is now applied to most of these buildings where they are used to deliver healthcare, reflecting the wider range of services that are provided in more modern times.

== Background ==
Following King Henry VIII's Dissolution of the Monasteries in 1536–40, only a few hospitals remained in use: St Thomas', St Bartholomew's, the Bethlehem Hospital for the insane and two lock hospitals for the treatment of syphilis. From the mid-16th century until the Voluntary Hospital Movement in the early part of the 18th century there was a dearth of hospital care in the UK.

The first voluntary hospital created to provide free care through the philanthropic action of doctors and surgeons for the ill poor was the French Hospital in Finsbury, London, started in 1718 by Huguenot immigrants. The movement developed with the opening of Westminster Hospital near St James's Park. This was followed by the commissioning of St George's Hospital at Hyde Park Corner. Over the next 50 years, voluntary hospitals were built across the UK with a larger number in the south of England, although one of the largest voluntary hospitals opened in Edinburgh in 1729. Funding was problematic in the early years as the development of voluntary hospitals competed with government, county and local funding for the provision of care under the Poor Law Acts of 1722 and 1782. The County Hospitals received enormous public charity support. Alongside these care facilities were dispensaries.

Accommodated in a single building, they provided what is now called out-patient and day-patient care. Medicines (termed ‘physics’) were prescribed, and minor surgical procedures as well as cupping and bleeding were carried out, the patient returning to their home after treatment.

== History ==
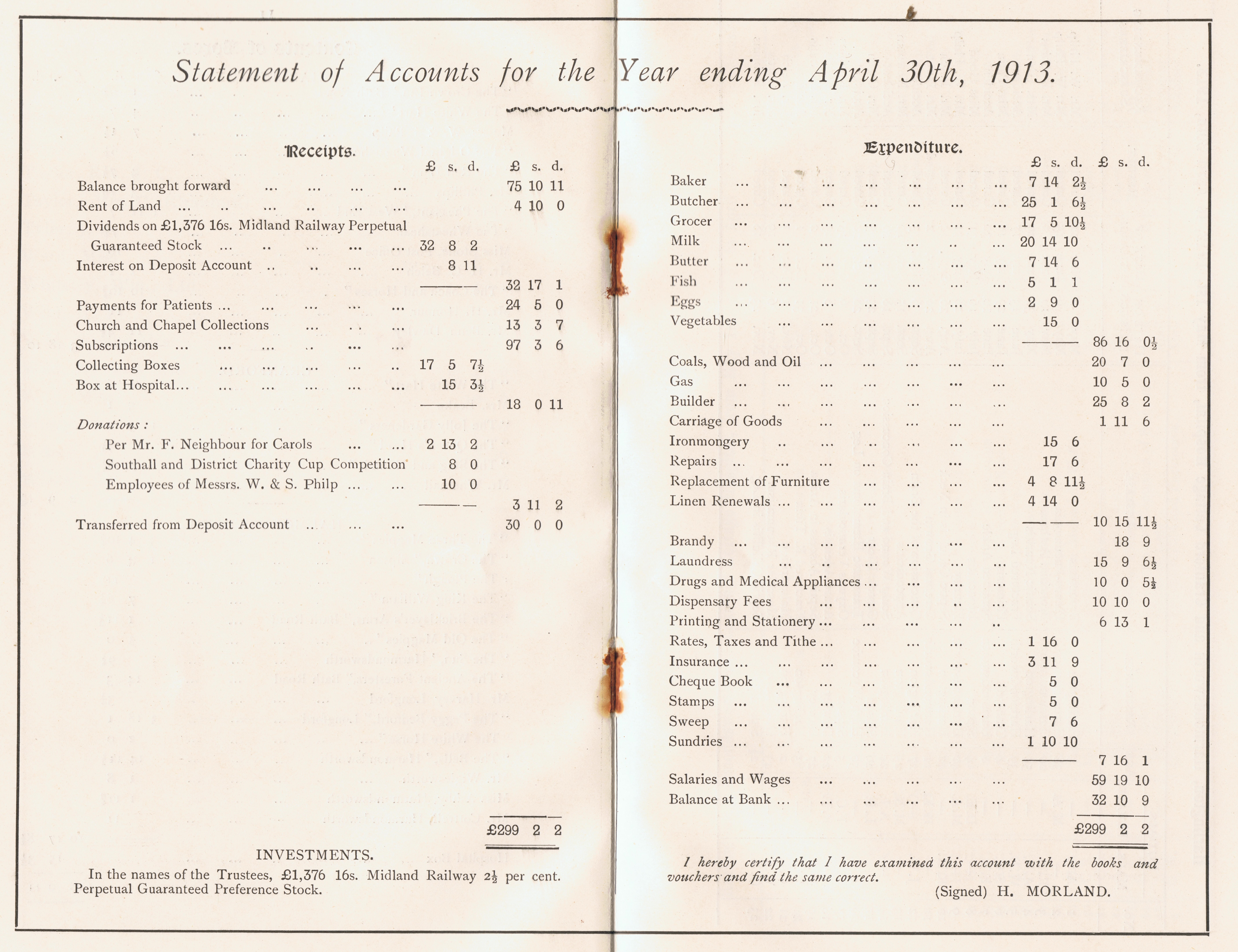
_{Accounts of Harlington, Harmondsworth and Cranford Cottage Hospital, west Middlesex, published June 1913. For the year 1912–1913 the hospital treated 46; of which 24 from Harlington; 18 Harmondsworth; 2 Cranford; with 2 passers by who had accidents.}

Harlington, Harmondsworth and Cranford Cottage Hospital's 1912–1913 patient list.

In 1818 the village surgeon, Mr. Henry Lilley Smith opened a dispensary in Southam, Warwickshire. This comprised an 8 bed-roomed cottage with 4 beds. It was for the use of manual labourers and their families. Except in name this facility fulfills the broad definition of a cottage hospital. p20

In 1827 Sir Astley Cooper converted some cottages at Piccotts End, close to Hemel Hempstead, into the first cottage hospital providing free medical services.

1842 saw the commissioning of a cottage hospital in Wellow, Nottinghamshire with six beds and managed by a board which included many eminent gentlemen. Mr. W Squire Ward was the surgeon on its inception and remained so for 25 years. One nurse was employed with occasional assistance and a wide range of surgical interventions were successfully carried out. p21

Between 1855 and 1898, 294 cottage hospitals were established.

In 1859, Albert Napper converted a small cottage into a hospital in the village of Cranleigh in Surrey. This hospital opened because Napper was concerned that there were no local hospital facilities for the poor in the village. St Thomas’ Hospital was the nearest voluntary hospital and that was about 45 kilometres away on unmade roads, a dangerous journey for an ill person. The only other possibility for care was in a local workhouse infirmary but this was some 12 kilometres away in Guildford, had no trained nurses and carried the real (at that time) risk of the patient being stigmatized as a pauper. The third possibility was to stay at home; in those days and for poor people this condition is indicated by Horace Swete, a village surgeon in Wrington in Somerset, UK, in his book of 1870.

To those who visit their poorer neighbours, the sick room of the cottager is a familiar object, the cottage itself generally consisting, at the best, of a kitchen and a back shed, with perhaps two bedrooms, which are often without a fireplace; the windows, small, low and frequently not made to open; the laboring man, who has met with a severe accident, with difficulty is carried up the narrow staircase – generally of the stepladder description – and is placed on a bed utterly unfit for the treatment of a broken limb, and which his restless tossings has disordered. Perhaps he may possess a coverlid or counterpane; but more generally the top covering of a sick man’s bed is the collection of unused clothes in the house; the floor, generally occupied by some ingeniously-constructed temporary bedding for the wife and younger children; no useful sanitary arrangements to be obtained; the patient parched with thirst, and with the capricious appetite of illness, turns his head away from the badly cooked food; the wife, tired out with bad nights, and "worritted" with the children who are constantly crying; added to which may be the close, sickening steam of ‘washing out a few things’, which some neighbour with well-meant kindness has dropped in to do, keeping up an incessant chatter of village gossip that drives the sick man wild, and here we have a tolerably fair picture of the cottage home in sickness."

The moneyed class could afford much better conditions and treatment in private hospital without the risk of loss of employment, a slide in poverty or worse.

Albert Napper's sympathy for the poorer classes was shared by the Reverend JH Sapte, Rector of Cranley (as the name was than spelled) and they fostered the idea of finding some accommodation for the care and nursing of the ill poor. Then an occurrence of a single incident is recorded by Swete as being the catalyst for the development of the cottage hospital. Sapte was riding across the common in Cranley when he heard of a serious accident. The victim had been carried to a nearby cottage and when Sapte arrived he found Napper and two assistants amputating the leg of the injured man. This incident confirmed for both men the need for some local facility where sick or injured people could receive urgent care. Sapte made a cottage available, rent-free, which after being whitewashed and simply furnished opened after a few weeks as the first cottage hospital.

That same cottage still exists today at the entrance to Cranleigh Village Hospital.

Napper proceeded to admit local patients to the Village Hospital, as it was called, and kept records from the start. Among the first 100 patients he recorded "compound fracture of both bones in the leg", "extensive cicatrix from a burn", "chronic pneumonia in both lungs", "multiple injuries" and amputation of fingers in a boy".

== Examples ==
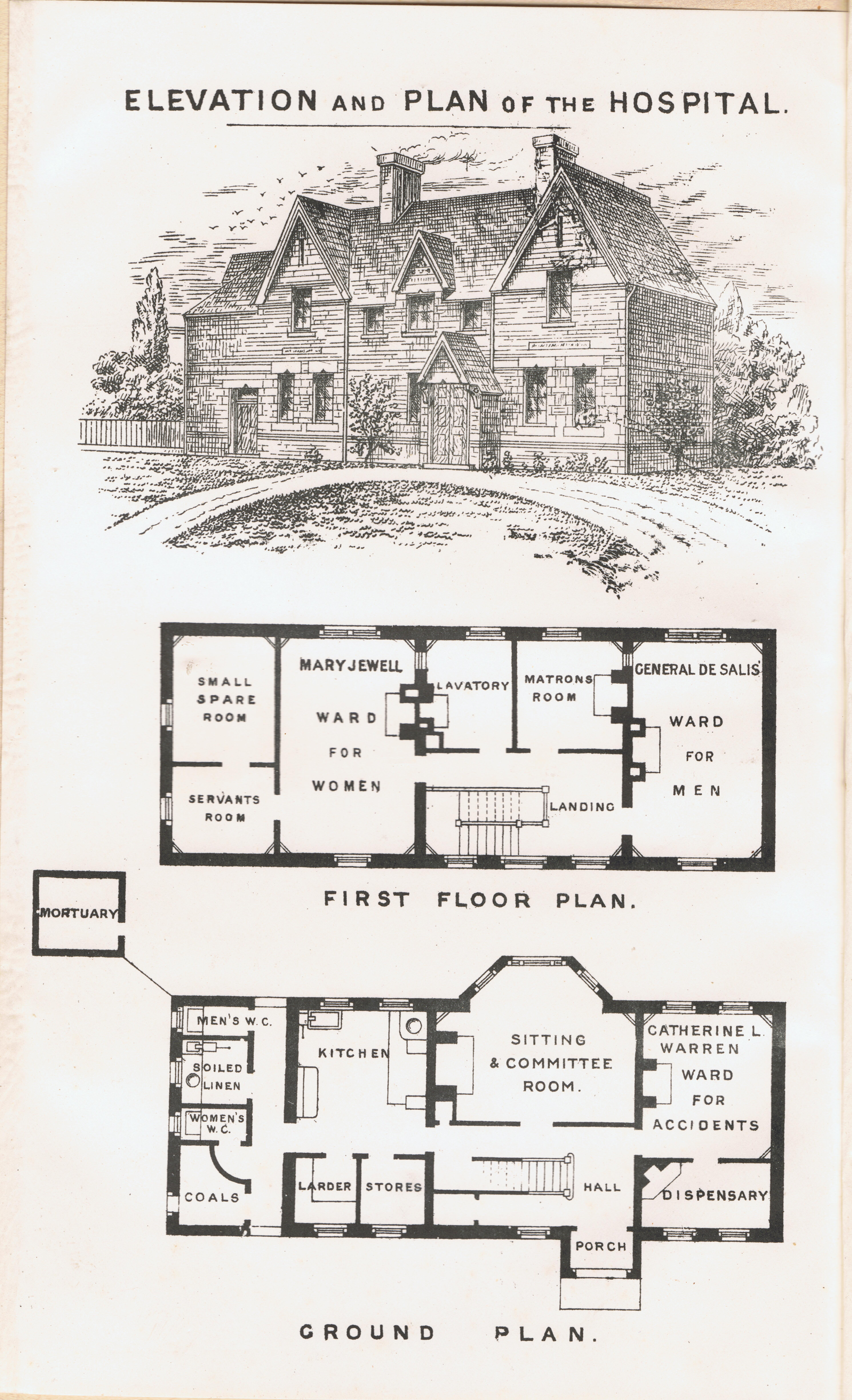
Harlington, Harmondsworth and Cranford Cottage Hospital, Middlesex, founded 1884

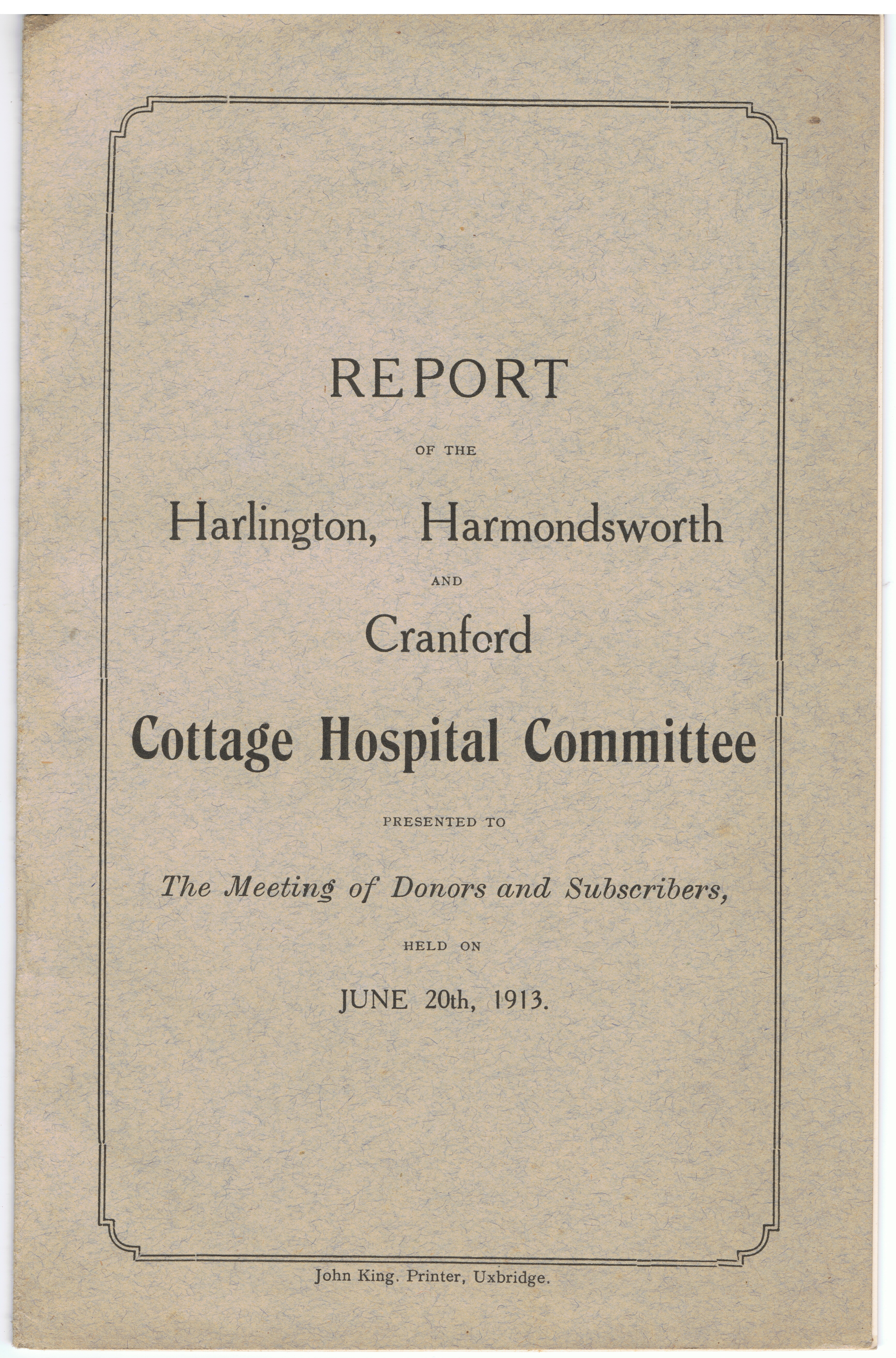
Report of a cottage hospital committee, 1913

- Turriff Cottage Hospital
- Ruth Lancaster James Hospital, Alston, Cumbria
- Fleming Cottage Hospital, Aberlour, Moray.
- Stephen Cottage Hospital
- Wells Cottage Hospital, Norfolk
- Castle Douglas Cottage Hospital
- Lochmaben Hospital, Dumfries and Galloway
- Cottage Hospital, Grosse Pointe Farms, Michigan
- Swanage Cottage Hospital, Dorset, UK
- Stretford Memorial Hospital (formerly the Stretford Practitioners' Hospital) was in its early days a cottage hospital used for women and children only.
- Harlington, Harmondsworth and Cranford Cottage Hospital, Middlesex.
- Aldeburgh Cottage Hospital
- House of Mercy, Pittsfield, Massachusetts
- Nantucket Cottage Hospital, Nantucket Island, Massachusetts
- Cottage Hospitals in Newfoundland, Canada
- Santa Barbara Cottage Hospital
- Uxbridge Cottage Hospital, Uxbridge, Ontario, Canada
- Woburn Cottage Hospital

== See also ==
- History of public health in the United Kingdom § Hospitals
