= The Oaks, Elgin =

- NHS Grampian
- Shown in Moray

Geography
- Location: Elgin, Moray, Scotland, United Kingdom
- Coordinates: 57°38′57″N 3°20′28″W

Organisation
- Care system: NHS Scotland
- Type: Specialist

Services
- Speciality: Palliative care day hospital

History
- Founded: 1997

Links
- Lists: Hospitals in Scotland

The Oaks is a palliative care day hospital in Elgin, Moray, Scotland. It is managed by NHS Grampian.

== History ==
In 1997 the Hospice in Moray steering committee published their proposals for a day hospice in Moray, and £2.2 million was raised by Macmillan Cancer Support towards the creation of The Oaks. The facility was built in a leafy setting, using extensive timber-cladding and with colourful planting. It was officially opened by Prince Charles, Duke of Rothesay on 5 August 2003. It was awarded a Macmillan Quality Environment Mark (MQEM) in 2010, recognising the high standards in building design. An extension was opened in 2011, providing a larger lounge and dining area.

== Services ==
The Oaks is a purpose-built unit to provide specialist care and support for people with cancer and other progressive illnesses in Moray. The Centre focuses on the control of pain and symptoms with the aim of reducing suffering and improving quality of life. It is situated in its own grounds approx ½ mile from Dr Gray's Hospital on the main A96 towards Inverness.
