= Kincardine Community Hospital =

- NHS Grampian
- Shown in Aberdeenshire

Geography
- Location: Stonehaven, Aberdeenshire, Scotland, United Kingdom
- Coordinates: 56°58′10″N 2°13′45″W

Organisation
- Care system: NHS Scotland
- Type: Community

Services
- Emergency department: Minor injuries unit

History
- Founded: 1998

Links
- Lists: Hospitals in Scotland

Kincardine Community Hospital is a small hospital at Kirkton Road, Stonehaven, Aberdeenshire, Scotland. It is managed by NHS Grampian.

== History ==
The hospital has its origins in the Kincardineshire Joint Isolation Hospital which was designed by Brown & Watt and opened in August 1903. It joined the National Health Service in 1948 and incorporated the James Mowat Nursing Home, which had been located in an adjacent private house, in 1961.

In the mid-1990s, NHS Grampian decided to replace the hospital with a modern facility and the new community hospital was opened on the site in 1998. A new renal unit was added in spring 2018.

== Services ==
There is a minor injuries department with a telemedicine link to Aberdeen Royal Infirmary's Accident and Emergency Unit.

A befriending service was established at the hospital in 2013 matching older patients ready to be discharged, but lacking confidence to return home, with a volunteer befriender. The volunteers then visit the older patients regularly in hospital and at home after discharge, offering on-going emotional and practical support. Local GPs reported the service had improved the overall health and wellbeing of their patients and reduced the number of medically unnecessary GP visits.
