= Seafield =

Seafield may refer to one of several places in Scotland:

- Seafield, Aberdeen, an area of Aberdeen
- Seafield, Ayr, a southern district of the Royal Burgh of Ayr in the South Ayrshire council region
- Seafield, Edinburgh, an area of north east Edinburgh
- Seafield, Inverness, an area in the city of Inverness in the Highland council region
- Seafield, Kirkcaldy, an area in the town of Kirkcaldy in the Fife council region
- Seafield, West Lothian, a small village in the West Lothian council region

Seafield may also refer to:

- Seafield Colliery, a former coal mine in Kirkcaldy, Fife, open from 1960 to 1988
- Seafield Convent, later named Sacred Heart Catholic College
- Seafield Park, a football park
- Seafield Park, Hampshire, a former military base in Hampshire
- Seafield Hospital, an NHS hospital in Buckie, Morayshire
- Seafield Tower, a ruined castle on the North Sea coast of Fife
- Earl of Seafield, a title in the Peerage of Scotland
- Seafield, County Clare, in the Republic of Ireland
- Seafield, Indiana, a community in the United States
