= Ian MacGillivray =

Scottish doctor (1920–2021)

Professor Ian MacGillivray FRCOG FRCP FRCPGlas

Regius Professor of Obstetrics and Gynaecology, University of Aberdeen
- In office 1965–1984

Personal details
- Born: 25 October 1920 Kirkintilloch, Dunbartonshire, Scotland
- Died: 18 June 2021 (aged 100)

Ian MacGillivray (25 October 1920 – 18 June 2021) was a Scottish doctor who was a professor of Obstetrics and Gynaecology at the University of Aberdeen and president of the International Society for Twin Studies.

== Early life ==
MacGillivray was born in Kirkintilloch, Dunbartonshire in October 1920. He was educated at the Leven Academy, Alexandria, West Dunbartonshire. He attended the University of Glasgow and graduated with a medical degree in 1944.

== Career ==
MacGillivray worked in a surgical post in Falkirk, then served on as a naval surgeon for two years in the Far East. In 1948, the University of Glasgow awarded him a research scholarship. He became a Member of the Royal College of Obstetricians and Gynaecologists in 1949, with his fellowship awarded in 1959. In 1960 he gave the Blair Bell Memorial Lecture at the Royal College of Obstetricians and Gynaecologists. He gained an MD with commendation from the University of Glasgow in 1953.

In June 1955 he was appointed Lecturer in Midwifery at University of Aberdeen. He was Dean of the Faculty of Medicine 1976-1979. In November 1960, MacGillivray was appointed to a newly created Chair of Obstetrics and Gynaecology at St Mary's Hospital Medical School. He took up the Regius Chair of Obstetrics and Gynaecology at the University of Aberdeen in 1965, succeeding Dugald Baird and held this until 1 October 1984. In 1976, he was appointed as president of the International Society for the Study of Hypertension in Pregnancy. He was president of the International Society for Twin Studies from 1980 to 1983.

== Later life ==
MacGillivray died on 18 June 2021 at the age of 100.

== Awards and honours ==
The MacGillivray Academic Centre, based within the Aberdeen Maternity Hospital opened on 16 November 1999.
