= Aberdeen Medico-Chirurgical Society =

Scottish professional organisation

Aberdeen Medico-Chirurgical Society (known informally as the Med Chi) is a society for medical practitioners in the North East of Scotland.

== History ==
Med Chi was founded in Aberdeen in 1789 by James McGrigor and James Robertson, originally as a society of medical students, unhappy with teaching at the city's two universities (King's College and Marischal College). In 1811 it evolved into a postgraduate society. A Medical Hall, designed by Archibald Simpson, was built on King Street in 1820, at a cost of more than £3,000. In 1967, the major portion of the library's old and rare medical books was sold, and later the Hall in King Street was sold. The proceeds enabled the Society to build a new Hall at Foresterhill, to which the Society moved in 1973.

Today membership is open to all doctors in the northeast of Scotland.

== Activities ==
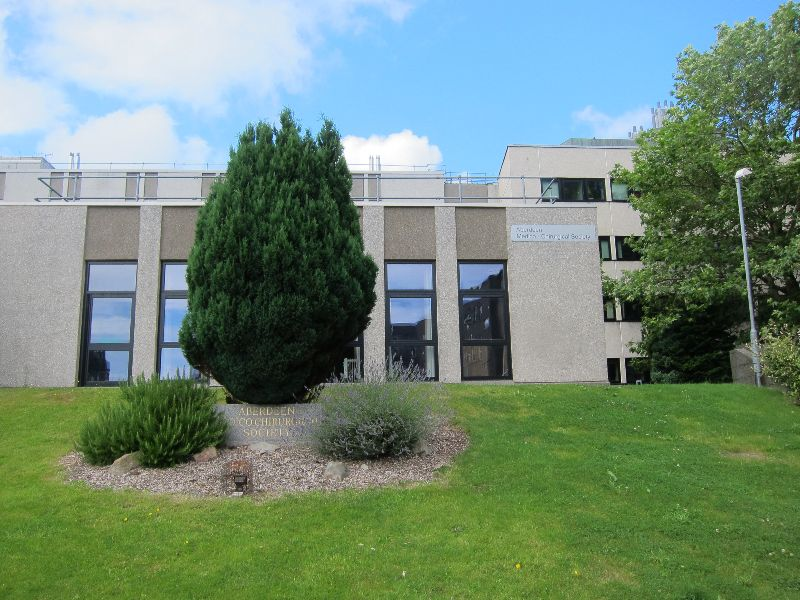
Med-Chi Hall

Med-Chi is based in premises on the Foresterhill site where it has an office, meeting hall, Council Chamber and library. The Hall seats 80 people, whilst the Chamber is set out in board room style for smaller numbers. The society holds scientific meetings each month from October to June and makes its facilities available to book for meetings and courses. The formal programme is complemented by an informal calendar of events, including the Annual Founders' Dinner, Burns Supper and golf competition.

The society funds several competitive bursaries for medical student electives.

The society has links with the Highland Medical Society and the Glasgow and Edinburgh Medico-Chirurgical Societies. Med-Chi sponsors the Scottish Medical Journal and has published several books, including 'The Bicentennial History', 'The 250th Anniversary of Aberdeen Royal Infirmary', 'J J R McLeod, the Co-discoverer of Insulin', and 'City Hospital Aberdeen'.

== Library ==
The library was established in 1791 and rapidly grew until the end of the 19th century. Its use then declined as it was replaced, for up-to-date information, by the university library. The collection of local material includes a complete set of society minutes from 1789. It has 60 volumes of Sir James McGrigor's records of his military service, including his account of the Peninsula Campaign when he was Director-General of the Medical Services. There is also a large collection of medical instruments and other artefacts dating back to the 18th century. The portraits, artefacts and documents form a unique record of local, national and international medical developments.

A book showing some of the portraits and medical artefacts in the possession of the society was published in 2007, in aid of the Matthew Hay Project.
