= 1964 Aberdeen typhoid outbreak =

Disease outbreak in Aberdeen, Scotland

In 1964, there was an outbreak of typhoid in the city of Aberdeen, Scotland. The first two cases were identified on 20 May 1964; eventually over 400 cases were diagnosed and the patients were quarantined at the City Hospital in Urquhart Road, Woodend Hospital in Eday Road, and Tor-na-Dee Hospital in Milltimber which was used as an overflow hospital for typhoid cases. There were three deaths connected with the outbreak. Dr Ian MacQueen, the Medical Officer of Health for Aberdeen, became well known in the media for his twice-daily briefings.

The outbreak was eventually traced to contaminated tinned corned beef from Rosario, Argentina and sold in the city's branch of the Scottish grocery chain William Low. Pollution from the waters of the Uruguay River (which flows into the Río de la Plata) appeared to be the source of the contamination, probably through water entering a defective tin through a small puncture. The infected meat then contaminated a meat slicing machine within the William Low shop, leading to the spread of the disease. The bacteria multiplied further in the meats as they were placed near a window and exposed to sunlight.

== Aftermath ==
The reputation of Aberdeen as a safe city to visit, live and work in was briefly harmed by the media coverage of the outbreak. In July 1964, following the end of the outbreak, Queen Elizabeth II made a high-profile visit to boost morale and to help rehabilitate the city's reputation.

An official enquiry and report into the outbreak was commissioned by the Secretary of State for Scotland. The enquiry was headed by Sir David Milne and his published findings became known as the Milne Report.

The reputation of William Low was irrevocably damaged within Aberdeen and the city's store, the source of the outbreak, closed for good three years later. Dundee-based company William Low subsequently opened many other stores around Scotland, but remained absent from Aberdeen. William Low was eventually taken over by Tesco in 1994. Public perceptions of the safety of Fray Bentos tinned meats also contributed to significantly diminished income.

The outbreak was successfully handled, although there were three fatalities confirmed. The outbreak drew attention to the need for better standards of hygiene, notably in the cleaning of food processing machinery. The University of Aberdeen went on to develop an international reputation in the field of disease control, notably in the appointment of Professor Hugh Pennington to the post of Professor of Bacteriology from 1979 until his retirement in 2003.

== See also ==
- Aberdeen Royal Infirmary
- Food Standards Agency
- Liebig's Extract of Meat Company
