= John Mallard =

English physicist (1927–2021)

John Mallard OBE FRSE FREng
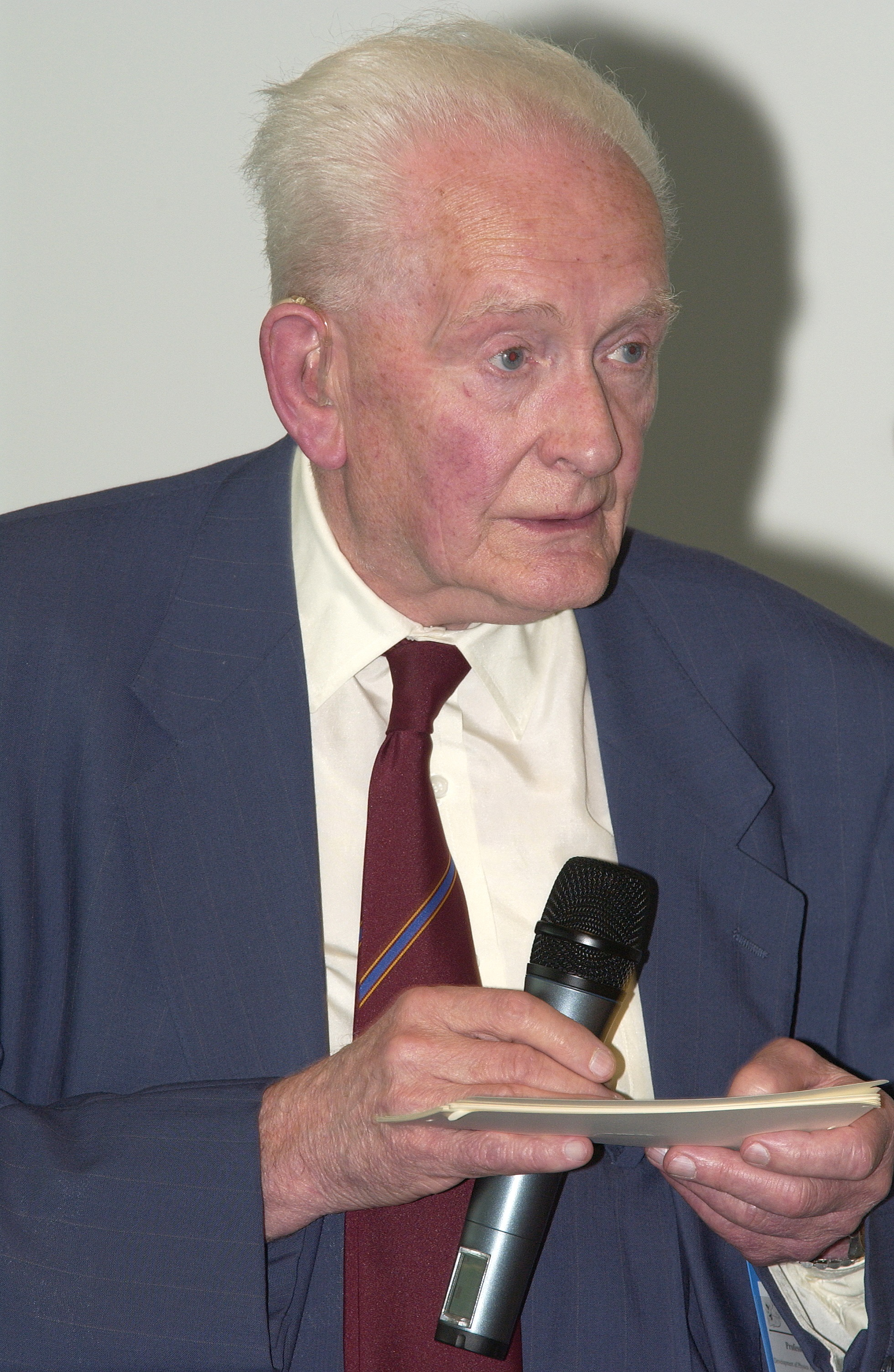
- Mallard in 2005
- Born: John Rowland Mallard; 14 January 1927; Kingsthorpe, Northampton, England
- Died: 25 February 2021 (aged 94)
- Education: University College, Nottingham
- Awards: OBE; Royal Society Wellcome Prize and Gold Medal; George Von Hevesey Memorial Lecture Medal; Landau Memorial Plaque of the American Association of Physicists in Medicine; Academic Enterprise Competition Prize of the British Technology Group
- Scientific career
- Fields: Medicine; Engineering
- Workplaces: University of Aberdeen

John Rowland Mallard OBE FRSE FREng (14 January 1927 – 25 February 2021) was an English physicist and professor of Medical Physics at the University of Aberdeen from 1965 until his retirement in 1992. He was known for setting up and leading the team that developed the first magnetic resonance imaging (MRI) full body scanner and, in particular, positron emission tomography (PET). He was born in Kingsthorpe, Northampton, England.

== Career ==
Mallard completed his PhD research into magnetic properties of uranium at University College, Nottingham under Professor Leslie Fleetwood Bates in 1947.

Mallard worked as Assistant Physicist with the Liverpool Radium Institute where he completed his training in hospital physics. He joined Hammersmith Hospital and Post Graduate Medical School in 1953, and in 1959 Mallard developed the first whole-body isotope scanner (homemade) in the UK, used for detecting a brain tumour, with C. J. Peachey. Mallard published his theories on electron spin resonance and cancer in the journal Nature in 1964 but they went largely unnoticed. In 1965 he was appointed the first chair of Medical Physics at the University of Aberdeen, predicting at his first lecture that positron emission tomography (PET) would become one of the most important tools for diagnosis and studying of diseases. Mallard brought to Scotland its first PET scanner, leading a national fundraising campaign and agreeing to bring a second-hand research machine from London. The scanner was located in a facility next to Woodend Hospital, which has been since replaced by the John Mallard PET Centre at the Aberdeen Royal Infirmary.

In the 1970s, Mallard set up and led a team, which included James Hutchison and Dr Bill Edelstein, to build the first MRI full body scanner. The scanner was first used on 28 August 1980, to scan a terminal cancer patient, before being replaced in 1983. During the 1980s, Mallard discovered "spin warp imaging", a technique that could produce three-dimensional images unaffected by the movement of patients. During the 1980s, there was a discussion on where MRI scanners should be based because radiologists were used to images not numbers, Mallard was quoted as saying:

"The human body is extremely complex. When, in addition, we first attempt to image a new property such as proton magnetic resonance, there is bound to be difficulty in interpreting the results... With this in mind, we have carried out a biological back-up program of T1 measurement on normal and pathological tissues to ease the problem of image interpretation and to find pointers toward the most fruitful fields for the application of NMR imaging"

Later in the 1980s, when imaging became standard on scanners, Mallard's team had originally developed the images in colour but had to transfer them into greyscale as radiologists were not used to colour. In the early 80s Mallard appointed David Lurie as postdoctoral researcher within the MRI team, suggesting he work on free radical imaging.

Mallard retired from the University of Aberdeen in 1992. Mallard was founder Secretary General of the International Organization for Medical Physics and went on to become its president. He was also Founder President of the International Union of Physical and Engineering Sciences in Medicine.

== Honours and awards ==
In 1972 he was elected a Fellow of the Royal Society of Edinburgh and a Fellow of the Royal Academy of Engineering in 1993. In 1998, the John Mallard Scottish PET Centre was opened in Aberdeen Royal Infirmary by the Minister for Health, Sam Galbraith. He was honoured with the Freedom of the City of Aberdeen in 2004. In 2004 the Institute of Physics and Engineering in Medicine established a lecture in his name, to be given annually at the United Kingdom Radiological Congress. Mallard honours also include the Royal Society Wellcome Prize and gold medal, the George von Hevesy Memorial Lecture Medal, the Royal Medal of the Royal Society of Edinburgh, the Landau Memorial Plaque of the American Association of Physicists in Medicine, and the Academic Enterprise Competition Prize of the British Technology Group.

== Death ==
Mallard died, at the age of 94, on 25 February 2021.
