= Roxburghe House =

English medical care facility

- NHS Grampian
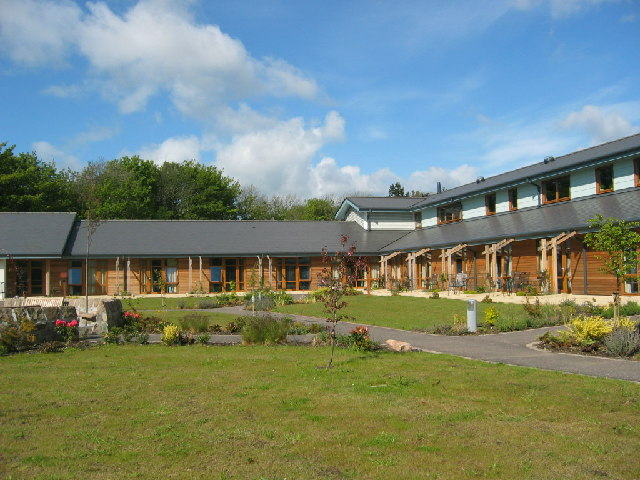
- Roxburghe House

- Shown in Aberdeen

Geography
- Location: Aberdeen, Scotland, United Kingdom
- Coordinates: 57.1570°N 2.1250°W

Organisation
- Care system: NHS Scotland
- Type: Specialist

Services
- Speciality: Palliative care unit

History
- Founded: 1977

Links
- Website: www.nhsgrampian.org
- Lists: Hospitals in Scotland

Roxburghe House is a specialist palliative care unit which is situated near Foresterhill, Aberdeen, Scotland. It is managed by NHS Grampian.

== History ==
Roxburghe House was established as a hospice and palliative care facility within the grounds of Tor-na-Dee Hospital site at Milltimber in Aberdeen in 1977. Diana, Princess of Wales visited Roxburghe House in March 1985 and a day care unit was added in 1990.

It moved to a purpose-built facility located to the east of the Foresterhill health campus in 2004. In September 2012 an extended garden area, which provides a peaceful and private area for patients and families, was unveiled.

== Services ==
The facility has a multi-disciplinary team approach to providing care for patients. The team has three consultants, several specialist nurses and a team of trained and untrained nurses. Other professionals involved in the team include occupational therapists, physiotherapists, pharmacists, chaplains, social workers, visual artists, and a writer-in-residence.

== Friends of Roxburghe ==
The unit has a charity attached to it, the Friends Of Roxburghe, who help out with teas, coffees, reception duties, and flowers. The Friends of Roxburghe House have been awarded the Queen's Award for Voluntary Service.
