= Alex Mowat =

Scottish paediatric hepatologist

Alexander Parker Mowat (5 April 1935 – 11 November 1995) was a Scottish paediatric hepatologist. He established the paediatric hepatology unit at King's College Hospital, London, which became a referral centre for children across Britain with liver diseases.

== Biography ==
Mowat was born in 1935 in Cullen, Moray, and was educated at Aberdeen Medical School, qualifying in 1958. After serving in the Royal Army Medical Corps in the Far East, he returned to Aberdeen to take up a research post in the Rowett Institute's enzymology department. He also completed a two-year fellowship at the Albert Einstein College of Medicine in New York, where he studied hepatology (liver medicine). On his return from New York, Mowat became a paediatric registrar at Aberdeen Medical School.

Mowat was appointed a consultant paediatrician and paediatric hepatologist to King's College Hospital in London in 1970. At the time, paediatric hepatology was a nascent specialty in medicine, and at King's Mowat established one of the first specialised units to treat children with rare diseases including biliary atresia, portal hypertension and liver cancers. He staffed the unit with a combination of hepatologists, paediatric surgeons, transplant surgeons, radiologists, pathologists, specialist nurses and dieticians. Under Mowat's direction, the unit pioneered new techniques for liver transplantation in children, one of which involves a parent donating part of their liver to the child. In 1986, Mowat received government funding which made the King's paediatric hepatology unit a supraregional referral centre for children all over the United Kingdom. He was appointed professor of paediatric hepatology at King's College in 1990.

Mowat was elected Fellow of the Royal College of Physicians in 1975. He authored the textbook Liver Disorders in Childhood, first published in 1979, which was regarded as the leading reference on the subject, and his research group at King's published over 200 articles on the subject of paediatric hepatology. He was made an honorary consultant in paediatrics to the Royal Air Force.

Mowat died suddenly in 1995 after giving a lecture at a medical conference in Chile.
