= Insch War Memorial Hospital =

- NHS Grampian
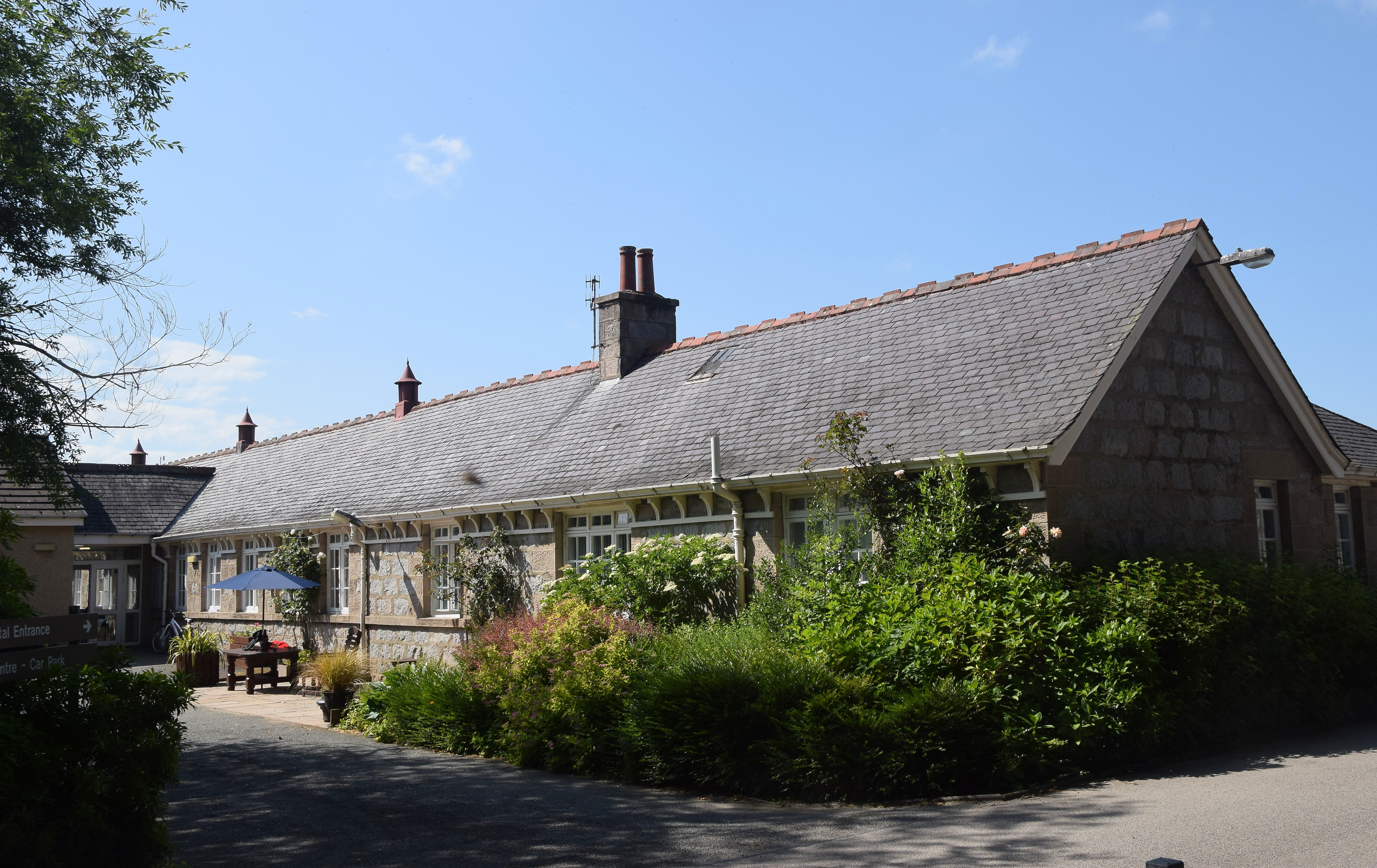
- Insch War Memorial Hospital

- Shown in Abderdeenshire

Geography
- Location: Insch, Aberdeenshire, Scotland
- Coordinates: 57°20′26″N 2°36′51″W

Organisation
- Care system: NHS Scotland
- Type: Community

Services
- Emergency department: Minor injuries unit

History
- Founded: 1922

Links
- Lists: Hospitals in Scotland

Insch War Memorial Hospital is a small community hospital located at Insch, Aberdeenshire, Scotland. It is managed by NHS Grampian.

== History ==
The hospital, which was built by public subscription to create a memorial for local people who gave their lives in the First World War, opened in August 1922. It joined the National Health Service in 1948. A day unit was added in 1972 and a further extension was opened in 1993.

The hospital has been closed since March 2020 as management claimed it could not be operated safely due to COVID-19 restrictions.

== Services ==
The hospital's Minor Injury Unit Service is delivered by a dedicated Minor Injury trained nurse and operates Monday to Friday between 8am and 6pm.
