= Turner Memorial Hospital =

- NHS Grampian
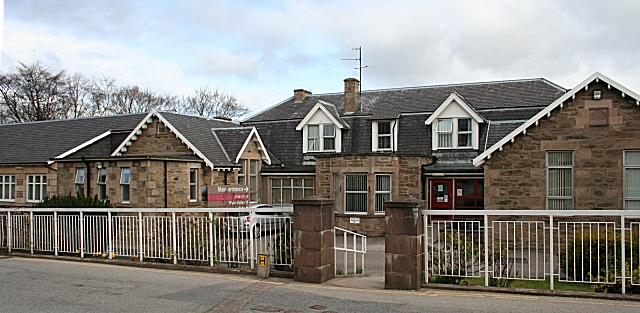
- Turner Memorial Hospital

- Shown in Moray

Geography
- Location: Keith, Moray, Scotland, United Kingdom
- Coordinates: 57°32′32″N 2°57′15″W

Organisation
- Care system: NHS Scotland
- Type: Community

Services
- Emergency department: Minor injuries unit
- Beds: 22

History
- Founded: 1880

Links
- Lists: Hospitals in Scotland

Turner Memorial Hospital is a community hospital in Keith, Moray, Scotland. It is administered by NHS Grampian.

== History ==
The hospital was financed by public subscription on the initiative of a Mr William Longmore. It was officially opened as the "Turner Memorial Hospital" in memory of Dr Robert Turner in 1880. It was expanded with the addition of two new wards in 1893 and further extended in 1926 and 1992.

== Services ==
The hospital has 22 beds providing for acute care, palliative care, rehabilitation and assessment and also a 24-hour minor injury unit. The hospital had links with Keith Community Radio which first broadcast in 1986.
