= Francis Peacock =

Scottish dance teacher and musician

- Born: 1723 possibly York, North Yorkshire, England
- Died: 26 June 1807 (aged 83–84); Aberdeen, Scotland
- Occupations: dance instructor, musician
- Notable work: Sketches Relative to the History and Theory, but More Especially to the Practice of Dancing

Francis Peacock (1723 – 26 June 1807) was a Scottish dance teacher and musician. He is considered the "Father of Scottish country dancing."

== Biography ==
Peacock was possibly born in York. He studied dancing under the celebrated George Desnoyer, who was later the dancing master at the court of King George III.

In 1742, citizens of Aberdeen appealed to the town council "that the town was at great loss for want of a right dancing master to educate their children." A few years later the town hired James Stuart of Montrose, Angus as the dancing master (an early term for dance teacher) but he was apparently found lacking; in 1746 the council advertised again for "a person of sober, discreet and moral character."

John Dawney, dancing master of Edinburgh, recommended Francis Peacock, also living in Edinburgh. On 14 February 1747, the town council appointed the 23-year-old Peacock as official and only dancing master of Aberdeen. He was paid seven shillings sterling per student per month, together with some money to organise the music.

In Aberdeen, Peacock established the first school of dance as well as the Aberdeen Musical Society. The society was founded with the physician John Gregory, organist Andrew Tait, and music copyist David Young. For almost 60 years, Peacock acted as a director and occasional violinist for the society, with profits from private concerts going to charity.

Peacock's teaching career in Aberdeen lasted five decades. Many of his students included the Scottish nobility; Peacock firmly believed that dancing was a vital activity for young people to learn grace and manners. He writes,

"I may here observe, that there cannot be a greater proof of the utility of Dancing, than its being so universally adopted, as a material circumstance in the education of the youth of both sexes, in every civilised country. Its tendency to form their manners, and to render them agreeable, as well in public as in private; the graceful and elegant ease which it gives to the generality of those who practice it with attention, are apparent to everyone of true discernment."

He is particularly known for his eight-volume treatise on dance, Sketches Relative to the History and Theory, but More Especially to the Practice of Dancing (1805). This was one of the early works on the history of dance. It was dedicated to Jane Gordon, Duchess of Gordon. He used the traditional Gaelic names for the dances but also employed the classical French ballet terms as well.

He also painted portrait miniatures and composed music, including an anthem played during the coronation of George III in 1761. He played the violin with the Aberdeen Musical Society, which he co-founded with David Young, Andrew Tait and John Gregory. He published Fifty Favourite Airs for the Violin (1762).

== Personal life ==
On 15 February 1748, Peacock married Ellen (or Helen) Forbes (died 1804) at St Nicholas's Church in Aberdeen. They had five children: Elizabeth, Jannet, John, George, and Thomas.

== Legacy ==
Peacock was also a philanthropist; the proceeds of his 1805 Sketches, amounting to £1,000, were donated to the Aberdeen Lunatic Asylum (now Royal Cornhill Hospital). He also left a considerable sum of money to charity in his will.

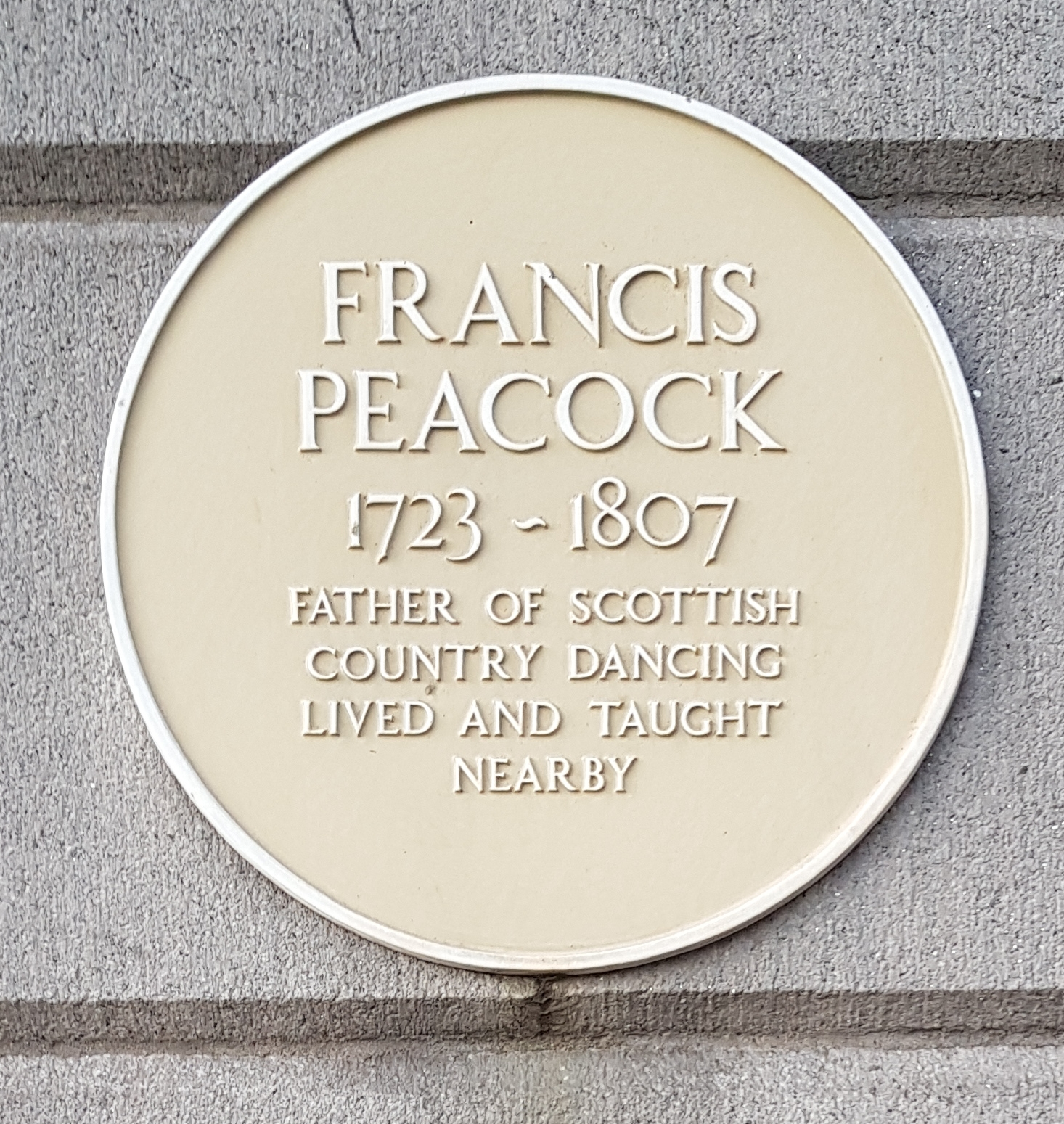
Francis Peacock - commemorative plaque

A commemorative plaque is located at his former dance school on Castle Street in Central Aberdeen. The street of Peacock's Close in eastern Aberdeen gets its name from him.
