= Inverurie Hospital =

- NHS Grampian
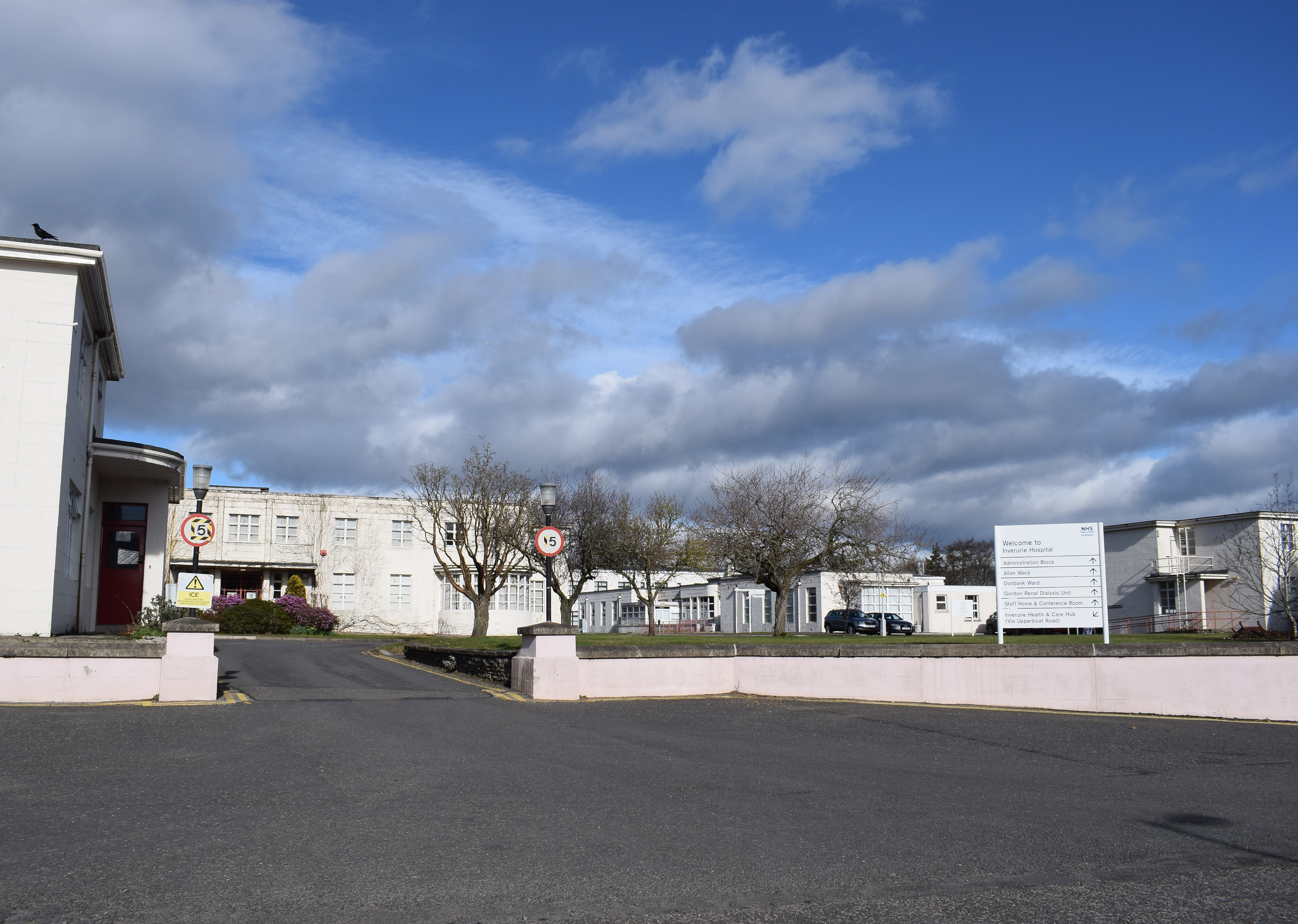
- Inverurie Hospital

- Shown in Abderdeenshire

Geography
- Location: Inverurie, Aberdeenshire, Scotland
- Coordinates: 57°16′38″N 2°22′41″W

Organisation
- Care system: NHS Scotland
- Type: Community

History
- Founded: 1897

Links
- Lists: Hospitals in Scotland

Inverurie Hospital is a small hospital in Inverurie, Aberdeenshire, Scotland. It is managed by NHS Grampian.

== History ==
The hospital has its origins in an infectious diseases hospital in Cunninghill Road which opened in January 1897. It moved to a new 60-bed facility in Upperboat Road, which was designed by R. Leslie Rollo, in December 1940. It continued to deal with a wide range of infectious diseases from across Aberdeenshire. Following the eradication of many infectious diseases, single storey wards were re-designated for general medicine in 1958.

== Services ==
The Minor Injury Unit Service in Inverurie is delivered by Inverurie Medical Practice at the Inverurie Health and Social Care Hub, during the hours of 8.30am-6pm Monday to Friday. There is no longer an out of hours Minor Injury Unit Service provided at Inverurie Hospital.
