= Jubilee Hospital, Huntly =

Health care institution in Scotland

Jubilee Hospital
- NHS Grampian
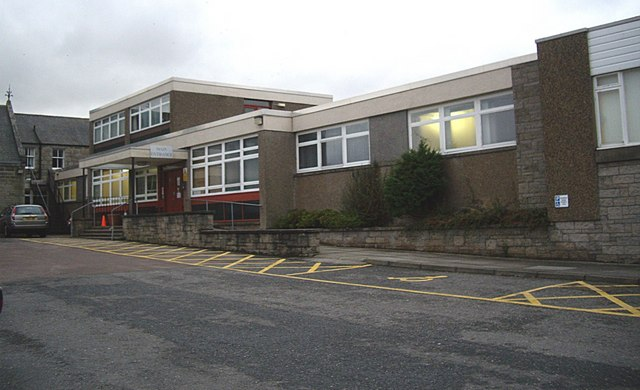
- Jubilee Hospital

- Shown in Abderdeenshire

Geography
- Location: Huntly, Aberdeenshire, Scotland, United Kingdom
- Coordinates: 57°26′36″N 2°47′20″W

Organisation
- Care system: NHS Scotland
- Type: General

Services
- Emergency department: Minor injuries unit

History
- Founded: November 1889

Links
- Website: Official website
- Lists: Hospitals in Scotland

The Jubilee Hospital is a community hospital in Huntly, Aberdeenshire, Scotland. It is managed by NHS Grampian.

== History ==
The hospital, which was financed by public subscription to honour the Golden Jubilee of Queen Victoria, was designed by Robert Duncan and opened in November 1889. It served as a Red Cross hospital during the First World War. An isolation unit for treating people with tuberculosis was added in 1925 and a day case unit was added in 1938. After tuberculosis had been largely eradicated, the isolation unit was converted into a maternity unit in 1944. A health centre was added in 1965.

In August 2014 the hospital was used as a safe refuge for residents of local care homes in the wake of Hurricane Bertha.

== Services ==
The hospital has a small x-ray department with a full-time radiographer who also provides an electrocardiography and pregnancy ultrasound scanning service. There is a 24-hour minor injury unit.
