= Aldeburgh Cottage Hospital =

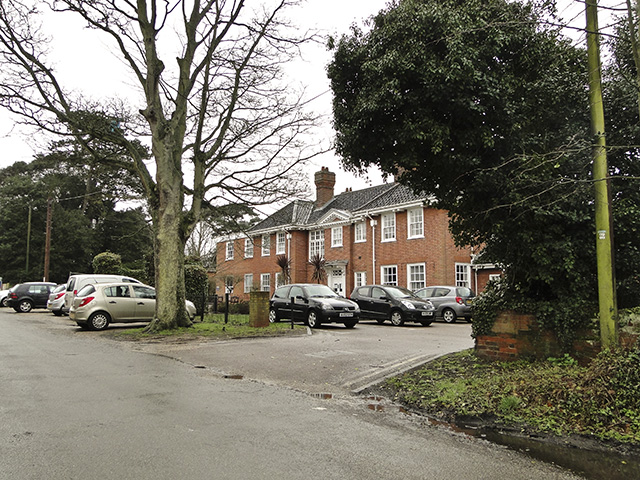
- Aldeburgh Cottage Hospital

- Location in Suffolk

Geography
- Location: Aldeburgh, Suffolk, England, United Kingdom
- Coordinates: 52.1523°N 1.5954°E

Organisation
- Care system: Public NHS
- Type: Cottage Hospital

History
- Founded: 1925

Links
- Lists: Hospitals in England

The Aldeburgh Cottage Hospital is located at Park Road, Aldeburgh, Suffolk in England. Its 20 beds are currently run by East Suffolk and North Essex NHS Foundation Trust.

== History ==
The hospital was founded in 1925 as the "Aldeburgh Cottage Nursing Association" and renamed as the Aldeburgh Cottage Hospital in 1944. It has since been renamed by the National Health Service as "Aldeburgh Community Hospital", but its main stakeholders, i.e. the patients, visitors, and local residents and taxpayers, continue to refer to it as the Cottage Hospital. The former MP for the area, Therese Coffey has said that the hospital is "well recognised and loved in the community". Aldeburgh Cottage Hospital has been "highly commended by the Care Quality Commission."

== Facilities ==
Aldeburgh Cottage Hospital is an in-patient hospital with 20 beds for who suffer long-term conditions. Other services include outpatient physiotherapy, x- ray, renal dialysis and a day centre. The hospital can also arrange for a clerk in holy orders to attend on the spiritual needs of patients, upon request. A mobile library run by St.John's Ambulance visits weekly.

The ward is run by a matron and a team of nurses and others. The hospital also offers various types of outpatient treatment. The hospital is also the headquarters for a team of district nurses and other healthcare professionals. In 2006 it had 31 beds.

== Attempts by the NHS to close the hospital ==
There have been many attempts since the 1970s by central NHS management to close the Cottage Hospital, so far without much success. A factor in the apparent determination of the NHS to close the hospital is that Suffolk Coastal District receives 10% less funding for the NHS per person than the rest of the country, according to its MP in 2006. As one prominent journalist from the area has written, "Before the election, people living on the Suffolk coast were promised an improvement in hospital facilities at Aldeburgh. The primary care trust (PCT) responsible for this bit of Suffolk has since announced that it will instead cut the number of beds at Aldeburgh Hospital from 36 to 20."

The attempts in the last 30 years to close the Cottage Hospital are not the first time that the Cottage Hospital has had to overcome threats. In 1942 a bomb destroyed the building, but the hospital re-established itself in rented premises temporarily, albeit operating in a much reduced capability of a maternity ward. The Cottage Hospital used to have a minor injuries unit, which was of great value not least because of the large number of children who holiday in Aldeburgh and Thorpeness and because of the local fishing fleet and farming community, but this has been closed.

== Prominent people who have supported the hospital ==
People from Aldeburgh and East Suffolk who been prominent in the effort to save the Aldeburgh Cottage Hospital include:

- John Gummer MP
- Andrew Gimson
- Dr. John Havard
- Jane Higgens
- League of Friends, Aldeburgh and District Community Hospital
- Aldeburgh Town Council
- Aldeburgh Hospital Action Group
