= Peterhead Community Hospital =

- NHS Grampian
- Shown in Aberdeenshire

Geography
- Location: Peterhead, Aberdeenshire, Scotland, United Kingdom
- Coordinates: 57°30′10″N 1°47′33″W

Organisation
- Care system: NHS Scotland
- Type: Community

Services
- Emergency department: Minor injuries unit

History
- Founded: 1939

Links
- Lists: Hospitals in Scotland

Peterhead Community Hospital is located in Peterhead, a coastal town approximately 32 miles north of Aberdeen, Scotland. It is managed by NHS Grampian.

== History ==
The hospital was financed by a gift from W. B. Shewan. It was designed by John Alexander William Grant and involved the conversion of a villa which was acquired in 1934 and the works were completed in 1939. Following extensive redevelopment, new facilities were officially opened by Princess Anne in August 1994.

In August 2005 Aberdeenshire Community Health Partnership issued a consultation document on Older People's Services, Maternity Services and Diagnostic and Treatment Services which included several proposals for reorganisation of services in the area.

Work to the main hospital entrance was completed in March 2014.

== Services ==
The services provided include a small midwife led maternity unit. The hospital also has a minor injuries unit.
