= City Hospital, Aberdeen =

City Hospital
- NHS Grampian
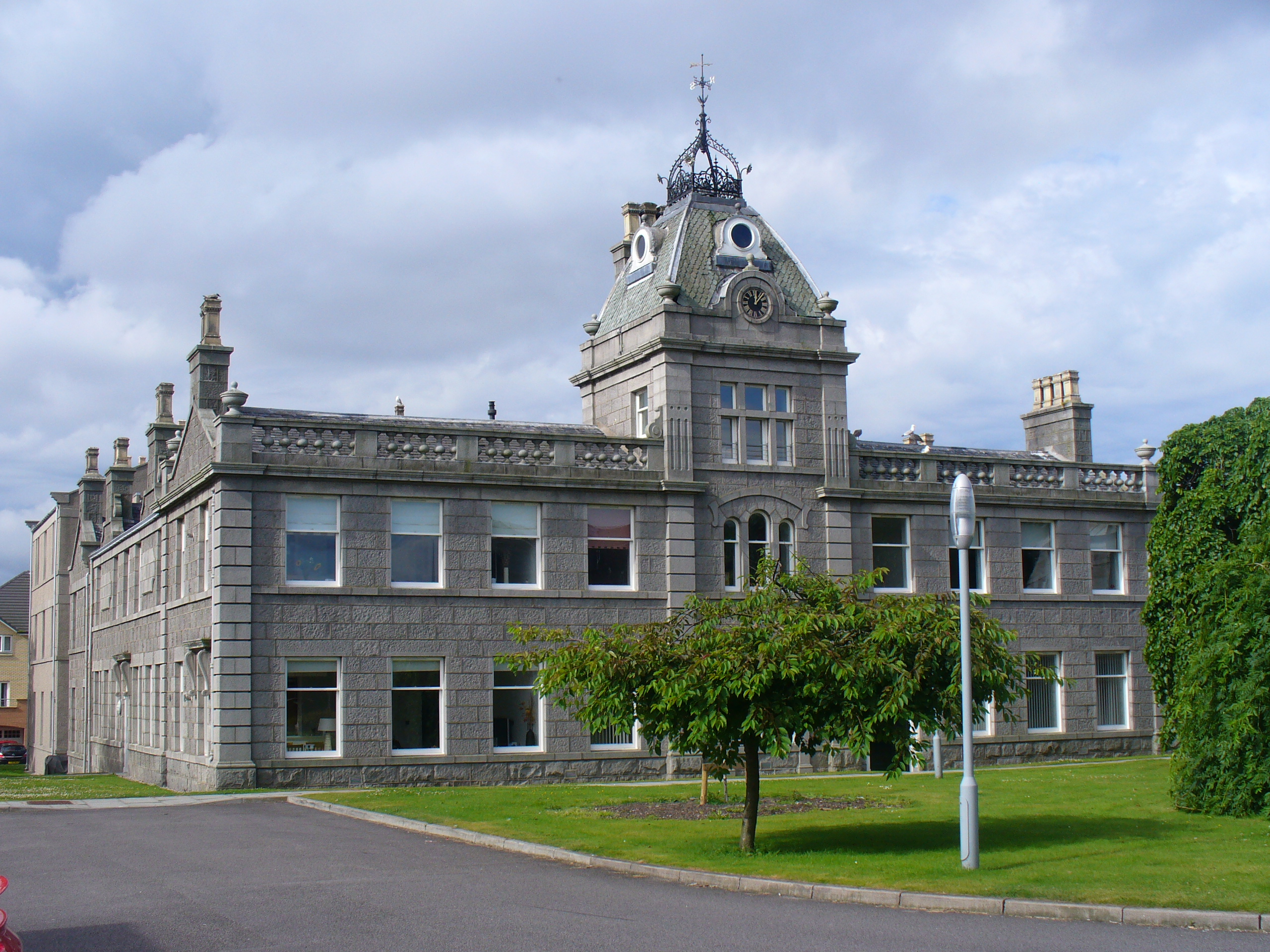
- City Hospital

- Shown in Aberdeen

Geography
- Location: Urquhart Road, Aberdeen, Scotland
- Coordinates: 57.1542°N 2.0866°W

Organisation
- Care system: NHS Scotland
- Type: General

Services
- Emergency department: No

History
- Founded: 1874

Links
- Lists: Hospitals in Scotland

City Hospital is a health facility on Urquhart Road in Aberdeen, Scotland. It is managed by NHS Grampian.

== History ==
The facility, which was designed by William Smith, was established as an infectious diseases hospital in 1874. It was significantly expanded in 1895 and a new nurses' home was completed in 1931. The hospital joined the National Health Service in 1948. During the 1964 Aberdeen typhoid outbreak, over 400 cases were diagnosed and the patients were quarantined at the City Hospital and Woodend Hospital, although no fatalities resulted.
