= Fleming Cottage Hospital =

Fleming Hospital
- NHS Grampian
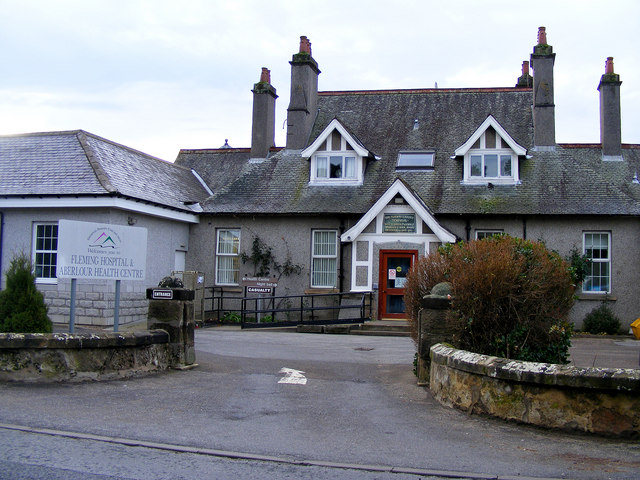
- Fleming Cottage Hospital

- Shown in Moray

Geography
- Location: Aberlour, Banffshire, Scotland, United Kingdom
- Coordinates: 57°28′9″N 3°13′22″W

Organisation
- Care system: NHS Scotland
- Type: General

Services
- Emergency department: Minor injuries unit
- Beds: 15

History
- Founded: 1900

Links
- Lists: Hospitals in Scotland

Fleming Hospital is a UK National Health Service hospital in Aberlour, Moray, Scotland. It is administered by NHS Grampian.

== History ==
The hospital was financed by a legacy from James Fleming (1830-1895), the distiller, and designed by James Leslie Findlay.

In 1891 the County Medical Officer for Banff reported: "The central portion of the District, including the parishes of Mortlach and Aberlour, with the police Burgh of Dufftown, is without Hospital accommodation for infectious diseases. I am of opinion that a combination between these Parishes for providing such accommodation would be advisable, or even a larger scheme to embrace the Parish of Knockando, and perhaps the Parish and Burgh of Rothes in Elginshire might be still better. In the remaining and upper part of this District, embracing Cabrach, Inveravon, Glenlivet, Kirkmichael, and Tomintoul, the population (except in the Village of Tomintoul) is sparse and scattered - distances are great and means of transport not readily available. Since the Notification Act was adopted only three cases have been reported from this part of the District, viz., one of Erysipelas and two of Typhoid Fever, one of the latter being an imported case. In conclusion, I would beg to quote the following from the Memorandum issued by the Local Government Board "On the provision of Isolation Hospital Accommodation." - Large villages and groups of adjacent villages will commonly require the same sort of provisions as towns. Where good roads and proper arrangements for the conveyance of the sick have been provided the best arrangement for village populations is by a small building accessible from several villages; otherwise the requisite accommodation (say) four cases of infectious disease in a village may be got in a suitable four-room or six room Cottage at the disposal of the Sanitary Authority; or by arrangement made beforehand with some trustworthy Cottage-holders, not having children, that they should receive and nurse, on occasion, patients requiring such accommodation."

Less than a month after James Fleming's death in the summer of 1895 a regional newspaper report dated 9 July gave some details of the planned Cottage Hospital:

"In our last we referred briefly to a bequest by the late Mr. James Fleming, Aberlour, for erecting and endowing an hospital. We have since learned some precise particulars respecting the bequest. By a deed of mortification, dated April 6 1895, Mr. Fleming, in order to benefit sick poor and others in the parishes of Aberlour, Inveravon, and Knockando, made over to trustees the sum of £8,000 to secure the necessary ground at Aberlour, and building thereon a Cottage Hospital, to be called the Fleming Cottage Hospital".

James Thomson, in his 1902 book Recollections of a Speyside Parish commented: "It is hardly possible for the younger portion of the inhabitants to fully realise the changed conditions that they are now enjoying. These changed conditions have been mainly brought about by the liberality of men who, by the wise disposal of their means, have benefited the parish, and laid the inhabitants under an everlasting debt of gratitude to its benefactors. One of them was the late lamented Mr. Fleming, whose benefactions to the place and to the people are wisely bestowed on objects that will be of lasting and real benefit to the parish. The hospital that has been built and endowed by his liberality will always remain a memorial to his Christian philanthropy. I can well remember more than one epidemic that devastated many a home in the village. had there been at the time such an institution the place many lives might have been saved. There can now be little doubt that the undrained state of the village and the bad water were the causes of the frequent occurrence of typhoid and scarlet fever, but happily all this is changed for the better."

The Fleming Cottage Hospital was officially opened on Monday 30 April 1900, by Mr. John Findlay of Aberlour in the presence of a large company of ladies and gentlemen. The ceremony took place shortly after twelve o'clock and was followed by a cake and wine banquet in The Fleming Hall.

== Services ==
Fleming Hospital was purpose built and is physically adjoined to the local health centre providing GP, community nursing and other primary care services. It has 15 beds providing medical care, rehabilitation, assessment, palliative/terminal care, convalescence and respite care. The hospital also has a minor injuries unit, which is open 24 hours a day. General medical and surgical out patient clinics are held on site.
