= Seafield Hospital =

- NHS Grampian
- Shown in Moray

Geography
- Location: Buckie, Moray, Scotland, United Kingdom
- Coordinates: 57°40′7″N 2°58′49″W

Organisation
- Care system: NHS Scotland
- Type: General

Services
- Emergency department: Minor injuries unit
- Beds: 32

History
- Founded: 1864

Links
- Lists: Hospitals in Scotland

Seafield Hospital is a community hospital in Buckie, Moray, Scotland. It is managed by NHS Grampian.

== History ==
The hospital was officially opened as Rathven Parish Hospital in 1911. It was expanded in 1919 and 1930 and, after joining the National Health Service in 1948, it was extended again in 1964. By this time the hospital was known as Seafield Hospital. It was refurbished in 2001 and the front doors were replaced in 2004.

== Services ==
Seafield Hospital has 32 beds providing medical care, rehabilitation, assessment, palliative/terminal care, convalescence and respite care. There is also a minor injuries unit.
