= Stephen Cottage Hospital =

- NHS Grampian
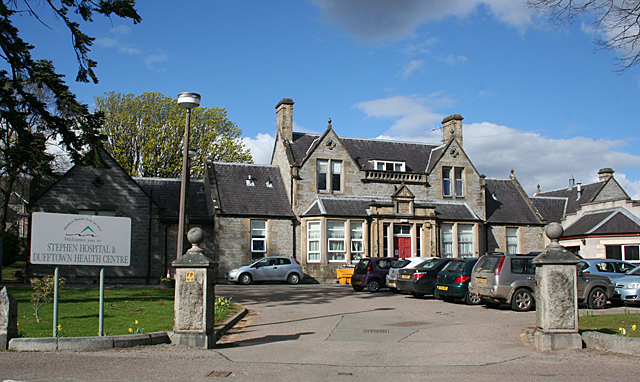
- Stephen Cottage Hospital

- Shown in Moray

Geography
- Location: Dufftown, Moray, Scotland
- Coordinates: 57°26′44″N 3°7′27″W

Organisation
- Care system: NHS Scotland
- Type: Cottage

Services
- Emergency department: Minor injuries unit
- Beds: 20

History
- Founded: 1890

Links
- Lists: Hospitals in Scotland

Stephen Hospital is a cottage hospital in Dufftown, Moray, Scotland. It is managed by NHS Grampian.

== History ==
The hospital was endowed by George Stephen, 1st Baron Mount Stephen, the entrepreneur behind the creation of the Canadian Pacific Railway. The hospital opened in 1890 and was extended by the addition of a second wing in 1984 and a purpose built health centre in 1976.

== Services ==
The hospital has 20 beds providing medical care, rehabilitation, assessment, palliative/terminal care, and convalescence. It also has a 24-hour minor injuries unit.
