= Suttie Centre =

Coordinates: 57°9′21″N 2°8′9″W

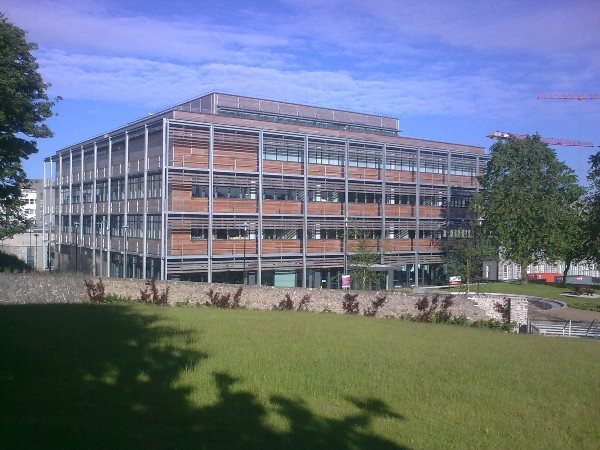
Suttie Centre in 2010

The Suttie Centre is a purpose-built training centre on the Foresterhill hospital campus in Aberdeen.

== Facilities ==
The Suttie Centre for Teaching & Learning in Healthcare is a partnership between the University of Aberdeen and NHS Grampian. Designed by Edinburgh architects Bennetts Associates, the £20 million, five-storey, timber-clad building opened in September 2009. Part of the University of Aberdeen, College of Life Sciences and Medicine, the centre is used for teaching undergraduate and postgraduate students, and a wide range of healthcare staff use it for their continuing professional development. There is public access to displays on medical history.

The centre contains the university Anatomy department, a 220-seat lecture theatre, a simulated ward area and facilities for the ‘volunteer patients’ who support the teaching of clinical skills. Advanced technology includes an IT suite and a range of innovative simulators including the UK’s first ‘sim-baby’. A public cafe and museum area presents the history of medicine in the north-east of Scotland.

A central atrium allows natural light into the heart of the building, which has a 6500 square metre floorspace in total.

The centre is the fulfilment of the vision of Professor Matthew Hay for the Foresterhill Health Campus, a joint site for healthcare. In 1900 he identified Foresterhill as a suitable location.
