= Foresterhill =

Area within Aberdeen, Scotland

Coordinates: 57.1546°N 2.1374°W

Foresterhill: Scottish Gaelic: Cnoc an Fhorsair; Scots: Foresterhill
- Location within the Aberdeen City council area Location within Scotland
- Population: Not applicable
- OS grid reference: NJ917070
- Council area: Aberdeen City
- Lieutenancy area: Aberdeen
- Country: Scotland
- Sovereign state: United Kingdom
- Post town: ABERDEEN
- Postcode district: AB25, AB16
- Dialling code: 01224
- Police: Scotland
- Fire: Scottish
- Ambulance: Scottish
- UK Parliament: Aberdeen North
- Scottish Parliament: Aberdeen Central
- Website: aberdeencity.gov.uk

Foresterhill is an area of Aberdeen, Scotland. It is the site of the city's main hospitals (Aberdeen Royal Infirmary, the Royal Aberdeen Children's Hospital and the Aberdeen Maternity Hospital), as well as the medical school and medical science departments of the University of Aberdeen. It is the largest hospital complex in Europe.

Foresterhill is situated at the highest point in the city, a site identified by Professor Matthew Hay in 1900. He had the vision of an integrated medical campus, with a combined hospital and medical school for the City of Aberdeen.

The site has its own helicopter landing site due to the hospitals' roles as tertiary hospitals for the North of Scotland and the rurality of Grampian as a catchment area, plus this is the primary emergency hospital for the offshore industries.

== Hospitals at Foresterhill ==
- Aberdeen Maternity Hospital
- Aberdeen Royal Infirmary
- Royal Aberdeen Children's Hospital

== Buildings at Foresterhill ==
=== Notable university buildings ===
- Institute of Applied Health Sciences
- Institute of Medical Sciences
- Medico-Chirurgical Hall
- Polwarth Building — main building of Aberdeen Medical School
- Suttie Centre — Teaching & Learning Centre
- Rowett Institute of Nutrition and Health

=== Other buildings ===
- Blood Transfusion Centre — run by the Scottish National Blood Transfusion Service
- Central Stores Complex
- Foresterhill Health Centre
- National Hyperbaric Centre
- Anchor Centre for haematology, oncology and radiotherapy is on site but will be open in 2023.
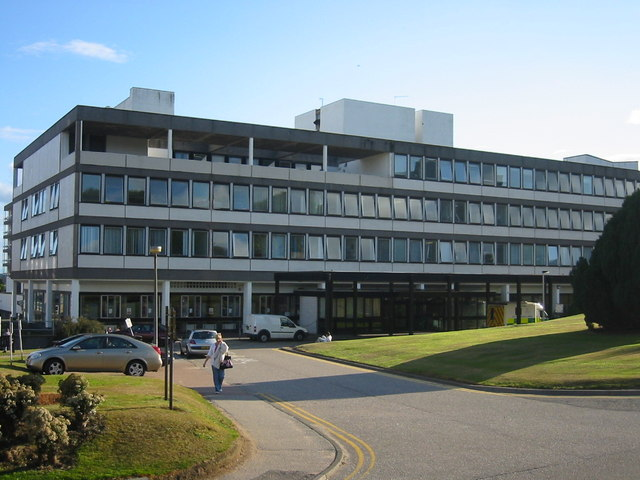
The main entrance to Aberdeen Royal Infirmary

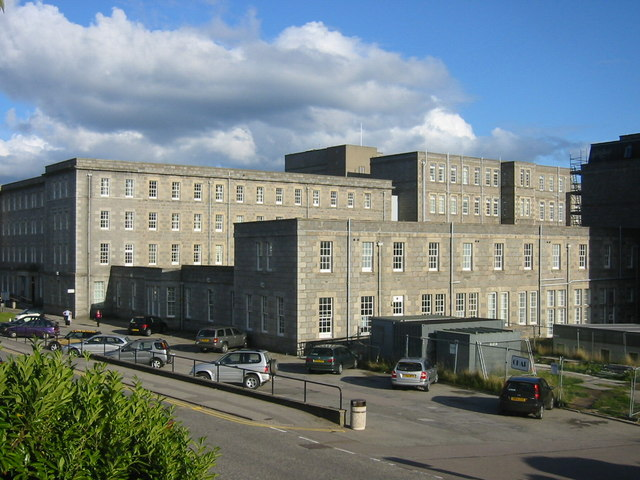
Medical wards at the Infirmary

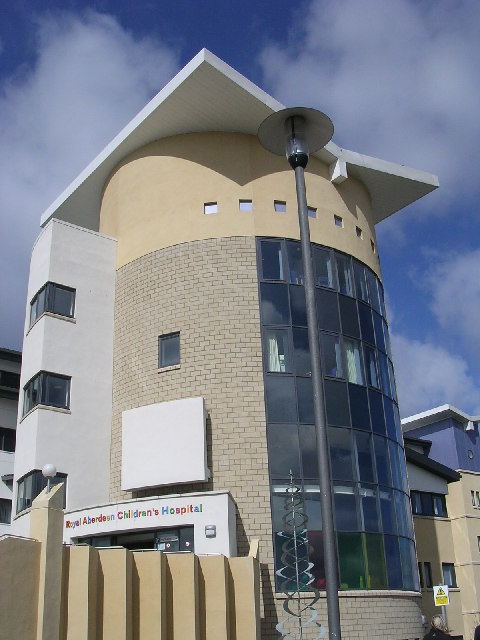
The Royal Aberdeen Children's Hospital

== See also ==
- Matthew Hay
- NHS Grampian
- The Robert Gordon University
- University of Aberdeen
