= Turriff Cottage Hospital =

- NHS Grampian
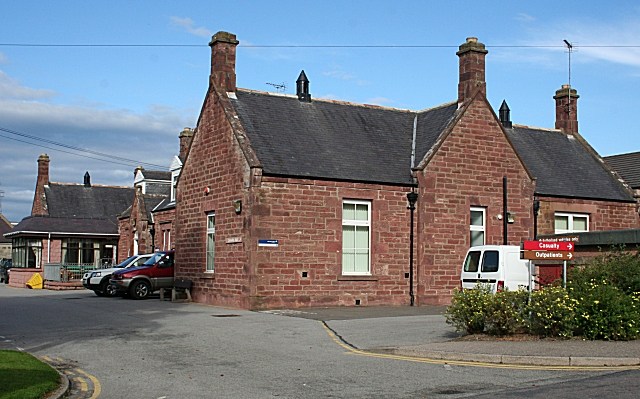
- Turriff Cottage Hospital

- Shown in Aberdeenshire

Geography
- Location: Turriff, Aberdeenshire, Scotland
- Coordinates: 57°32′15″N 2°26′57″W

Organisation
- Care system: NHS Scotland
- Type: Community

Services
- Emergency department: Minor injuries unit
- Beds: 19

History
- Founded: 1895

Links
- Website: Turriff Hospital
- Lists: Hospitals in Scotland

Turriff Cottage Hospital is a community hospital in Turriff, Aberdeenshire, Scotland. It is managed by NHS Grampian.

== History ==
The hospital was designed by James Duncan as a joint infectious diseases hospital to serve both the burgh and district. It opened as the Turriff Joint Hospital in 1895. It closed in 1932 but re-opened with a new nurses' home in 1936. The facility had some refurbishment in 1998 and it became the first site in NHS Grampian to become completely smoke-free in January 2014.

== Services ==
The hospital has 19 beds and is attached to the local health centre. It has x-ray facilities and a 24-hour minor injuries unit.
