= Aberdeen Health Village =

Aberdeen Community Health and Care Village
- NHS Grampian
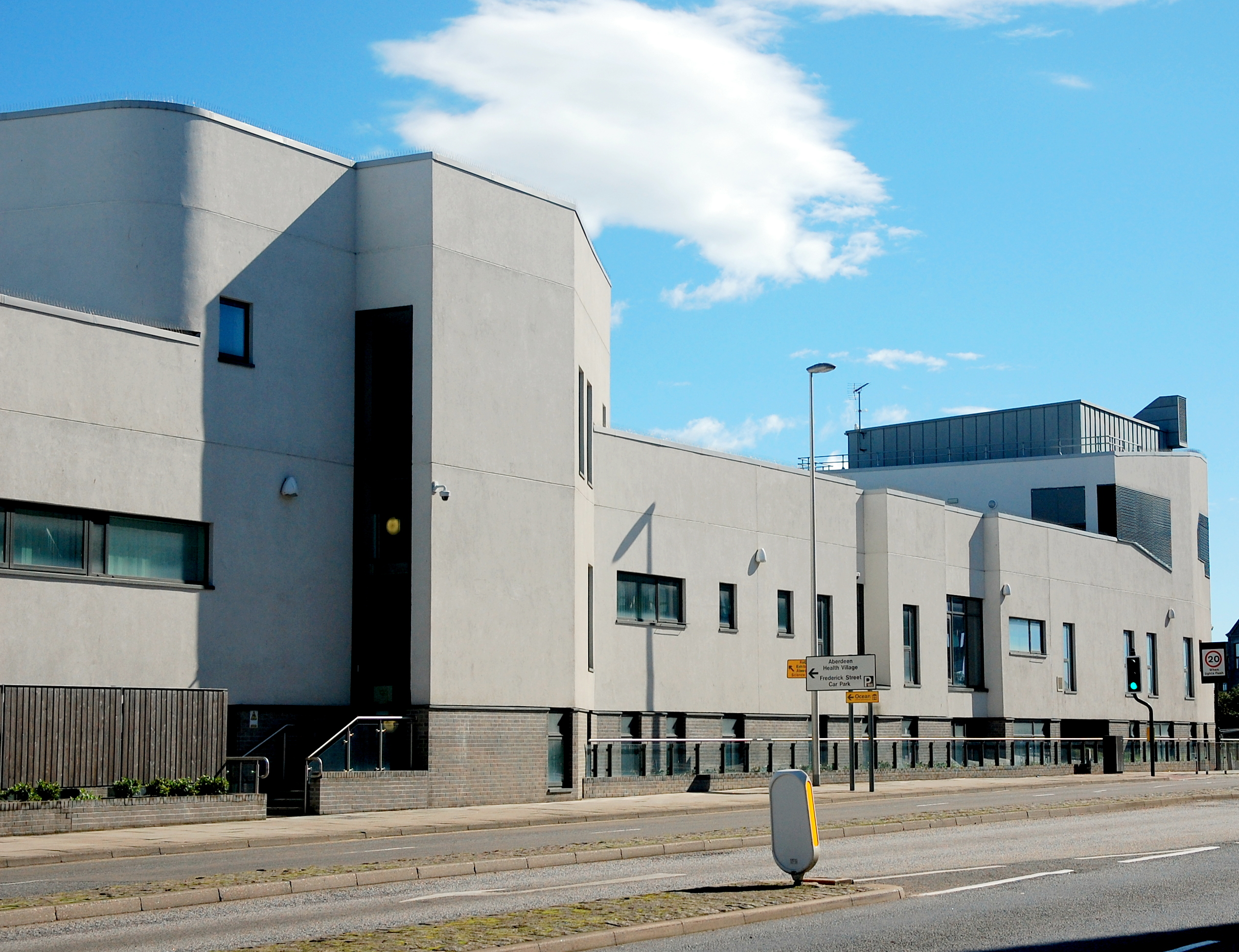
- Aberdeen Community Health and Care Village

- Shown in Aberdeen

Geography
- Location: Aberdeen, Scotland
- Coordinates: 57.150243°N 2.091621°W

Organisation
- Care system: NHS Scotland
- Type: Community hospital
- Affiliated university: University of Aberdeen; Robert Gordon University

Services
- Emergency department: No
- Beds: N/A

History
- Founded: 2013

Links
- Website: www.nhsgrampian.org/hospital-hub/aberdeen-health-village

Aberdeen Community Health and Care Village, commonly known as Aberdeen Health Village, is a community hospital located in the centre of Aberdeen, Scotland. It is managed by NHS Grampian.

== History ==
Plans for the complex were announced in 2010. The facility, which cost £15 million to construct, opened in December 2013. It was the first healthcare facility to be completed in Scotland under the hub framework of the Scottish Futures Trust.

== Services ==
The health village, which is designed to offer services to 700 patients a day, contains 275 rooms including three dental suites, two minor procedure rooms and 29 consulting rooms. Services being run from the health village include: cardiac rehabilitation, dentistry, dietetics, physiotherapy, podiatry, radiology, sexual health, speech and language therapy and minor surgery. An endoscopy service was provided from June 2014.

The health village acts as an educational resource for patients, carers and community-based staff. The health village also provides improved access to community based learning opportunities for healthcare professionals such as general practitioners (GPs) and GP trainees.

== Mural ==
Work on a mural on the side of the building began in July 2021. It is being painted by Fanakapan, a London-based artist, as part of the 2021 NuArt Festival.
