= Day hospital =

Outpatient medical facility

A day hospital is an outpatient facility where patients attend for assessment, treatment or rehabilitation during the day and then return home or spend the night at a different facility. Day hospitals are becoming a new trend in healthcare. The number of surgical procedures carried out on a same-day basis has markedly increased in EU countries and USA. New medical technologies such as less invasive surgeries and better anesthetics have made this development possible. These innovations improve patient safety and health outcomes. Shortening the length of stay in hospital reduces the cost per intervention and increases the number of procedures performed. Less hospital beds are necessary, and they are often replaced by day hospital chairs that enable admission and preparation of the patient before surgery and recovery after surgery.

The patient groups most likely to receive this sort of hospital provision are elderly people, those with psychiatric problems, and those with physical rehabilitative needs. It is also used for some cancer treatments.

Day hospitals were created during the Soviet Union under Stalin, they were imported to modern occidental countries after the Second World War.

== Australia ==
In Australia, many older people receive care in day hospitals, but for patients with psychiatric conditions day hospitals have largely been superseded by community mental health teams.

== France ==
In France, there are day hospitals specialized in psychiatric treatment. Patients have an appointment with a psychiatric physician once a month for check ups, to get drug prescriptions and consultations. They are called "Hopital de jour" in French.

For instance the day hospital of a French city has a medical service with 6 doctors, 12 nurses, 5 secretaries, 7 social workers. The social service helps people with tasks such as applying for free medical insurance, disability benefits and caretakers, and finding suitable housing.

== Sweden ==
Day hospital services for elderly people have existed in Sweden since the early 1950s. By 1982, there were 58 day hospitals with a total of 1,600 places (=beds) in the country. Day hospitals are integrated with primary health care and social care.

== United Kingdom ==
In the United Kingdom, day hospitals originated in the late 1950s with a focus on rehabilitation for frail older people, enabling many to remain in their own homes. Comprehensive assessment and a range of specialised services have since been introduced. Day hospitals in the UK are normally run by an NHS trust and focus on therapeutic assessment and management, as distinct from "day care" facilities run by local authorities or voluntary agencies and offering social support. They may operate on a sessional basis rather than throughout the day, and may rotate between locations from day to day.

Benefits have been identified in reduced rates of mortality and morbidity and reduced inpatient admissions, although there is a lack of evidence for other benefits and cost-effectiveness.

== United States ==
Day hospital services are well established in the United States. These services may be termed as "partial hospitalization" in some regions.
