= Dr Gray's Hospital =

- NHS Grampian
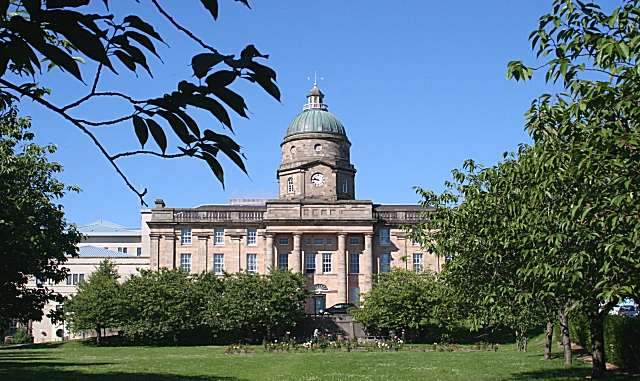
- Dome and clock at the hospital

- Shown in Moray

Geography
- Location: Elgin, Moray, Scotland, United Kingdom
- Coordinates: 57.64578°N 3.32937°W

Organisation
- Care system: NHS Scotland
- Type: District General
- Affiliated university: University of Aberdeen; Robert Gordon University; University of the Highlands and Islands

Services
- Emergency department: Yes Accident & Emergency
- Beds: 185

History
- Founded: 1819

Links
- Website: Dr Gray's Hospital webpage
- Lists: Hospitals in Scotland

Dr. Gray's Hospital is a district general hospital located in Elgin, Moray, Scotland, managed by NHS Grampian.

== History ==
The hospital was founded as a result of a bequest by Alexander Gray (d. 1807), who was born in Elgin but worked as a surgeon for the East India Company. His will was contested by his family, but eventually his bequest of £20,000 'for the establishment of a hospital in the town of Elgin for the sick and poor of the county of Murray (Moray)' was proven in the Court of Chancery.

The hospital was designed by James Gillespie Graham, featuring a large classical block with giant Doric columns that supported a portico and was topped with drum tower and dome. Work on building the hospital at the western end of the town's High Street started in 1815 and the hospital opened on 1 January 1819, providing 30 beds that could be used for any parishioner of Moray who could produce a note of recommendation from their local minister of the established church. Often those of the Episcopalian or Catholic faith were turned away, causing conflict with the Burgh council on a number of occasions. Some patients who required urgent assistance were sent home critically ill lacking the paperwork from the Kirk minister, ultimately causing their death.

A £22 million redevelopment of the hospital took place between 1992 and 1997 and included extensive refurbishment of existing facilities. The first stage, completed in May 1995, created a new complex for obstetrics, gynaecology and paediatric services, three new operating theatres and five new lifts. In January 1997 the second stage of redevelopment was completed, adding a new acute psychiatric ward and a new accident and emergency building.

A sensory garden was opened in 2010 to provide patients, visitors and staff with an attractive place to relax.

In 2012 a further £3 million redevelopment project commenced. The work, which included a new reception area, a rehabilitation ward, children's outpatient area and discharge lounge, was completed in 2013.

== Services ==
Dr Gray's Hospital has 185 inpatient beds. It delivers approximately 1,100 births per year and has had full accreditation as baby friendly since May 2012.
