= Aberdeen Maternity Hospital =

- NHS Grampian
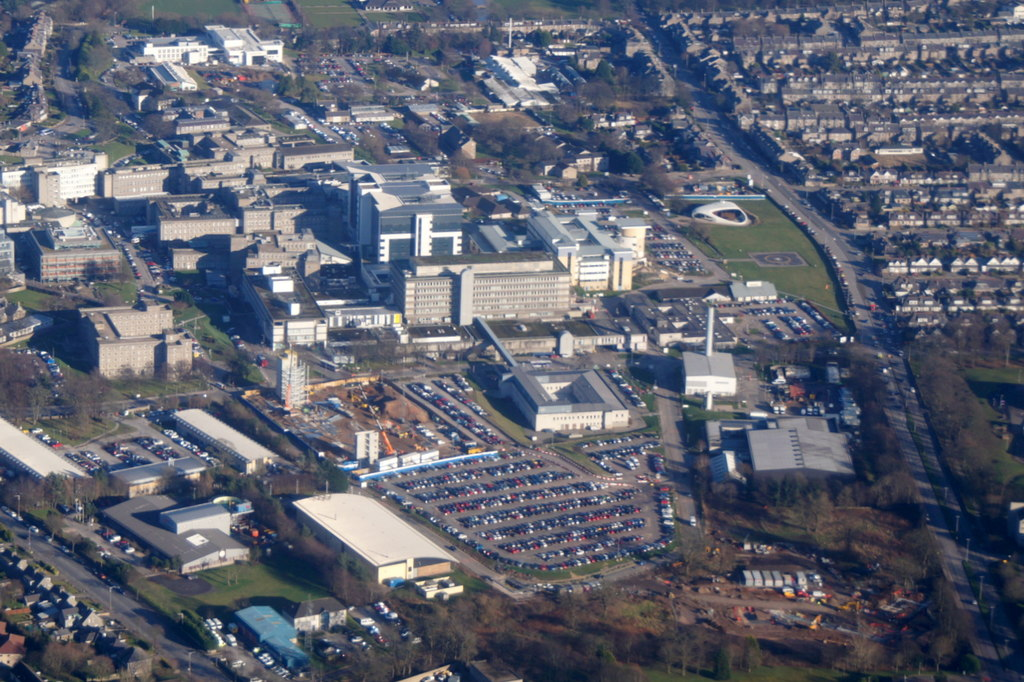
- Foresterhill Health Campus (the maternity hospital is one of the buildings at the top left in this photograph)

- Shown in Aberdeen

Geography
- Location: Aberdeen, Scotland
- Coordinates: 57.1552°N 2.1320°W

Organisation
- Care system: NHS Scotland
- Type: Specialist
- Affiliated university: University of Aberdeen; Robert Gordon University

Services
- Emergency department: No
- Speciality: Maternity hospital

History
- Founded: 1940s

Links
- Website: Website
- Lists: Hospitals in Scotland

Aberdeen Maternity Hospital (AMH) is a specialist maternity hospital in Aberdeen, Scotland. Between 4,000 and 5,000 babies are born at AMH each year. The hospital is located in the Foresterhill area of Aberdeen and serves the region of Grampian as well as the islands of Shetland and Orkney. It is managed by NHS Grampian.

== History ==
The hospital has its origins in the a small facility established at Guestrow in 1870. It moved to Barrett's Close in 1893 and to Castle Street in 1900.

The move to a new building, which was designed by James Brown Nicol and built between 1934 and 1937, formed part of the Aberdeen Joint Hospitals Scheme as envisaged by Professor Matthew Hay, which involved the development of an integrated medical campus at Foresterhill. An ante-natal hospital was added in 1941 and the facility joined the National Health Service in 1948. The hospital progressed to stage two accreditation of the Baby Friendly Hospital Initiative in July 2011.

Construction of new hospital buildings - for The Baird Family Hospital and Anchor cancer centre - was delayed after costs escalated from £163m to £223m. In February 2020, forecast completion dates were 2022 and March 2023 respectively.

== Services ==
The Department of Obstetrics and Gynaecology, University of Aberdeen, is based at the hospital, which conducts a variety of research with an emphasis on obstetric epidemiology (including maternal mortality and morbidity), infertility and the prevention of cancer in women. Aberdeen is also particularly known for its research into multiple pregnancy. The associated Dugald Baird Centre for Research on Women's Health was set up in 1995 and is primarily a research unit, with consultative and teaching responsibilities. Current work focuses on a number of themes in reproductive health research and methodological development in evaluation. The centre is named after Sir Dugald Baird (1899–1986), Regius Professor of Midwifery at the University of Aberdeen from 1937 to 1965.
