= NHS Grampian =

NHS board based in Aberdeen, Scotland

- Type: NHS board
- Established: 2004
- Headquarters: 2 Eday Road; Aberdeen; AB15 6RE
- Region served: Aberdeen; Aberdeenshire; Moray
- Hospitals: Aberdeen Community Health and Care Village; Aberdeen Maternity Hospital; Aberdeen Royal Infirmary; Chalmers Hospital; Aberdeen Maternity Hospital; Dr Gray's Hospital; Fleming Cottage Hospital; Glen O'Dee Hospital; Insch War Memorial Hospital; Inverurie Hospital; Jubilee Hospital; Kincardine Community Hospital; The Oaks; Peterhead Community Hospital; Roxburghe House; Royal Aberdeen Children's Hospital; Royal Cornhill Hospital; Seafield Hospital; Stephen Cottage Hospital; Turner Memorial Hospital; Turriff Cottage Hospital; Ugie Hospital; Woodend Hospital
- Chief executive: Laura Skaife-Knight
- Staff: 17000 in 2024/25
- Website: www.nhsgrampian.org

NHS Grampian is an NHS board which forms one of the fourteen regional health boards of NHS Scotland. It is responsible for proving health and social care services to a population of over 500,000 people living in Aberdeen, Aberdeenshire and Moray.

NHS Grampian is also very closely linked with both the University of Aberdeen and The Robert Gordon University, especially in the fields of research, workforce planning and training.

== History ==
The health board was formed on 1 April 2004 by the amalgamation of Grampian University Hospitals NHS Trust, Grampian Primary Care NHS Trust and Grampian Health Board. The health board's headquarters are located at Summerfield House in the Summerhill area of Aberdeen. NHS Grampian consists of acute services, corporate services and three Community Health Partnerships and works closely with the local authorities.

Chief executive Richard Carey announced he was to take early retirement in November 2014. Dr Izhar Khan, chairman of the area medical committee, and Mr Norman Binnie, chairman of the consultants' sub-committee, issued a statement claiming that loss of confidence in the executive of the board was widely held among senior clinicians. Medical director Roelf Dijkhuizen announced his intention to retire in Autumn 2014 shortly after a preliminary HIS investigation confirmed a full investigation into Aberdeen Royal Infirmary. The board chairman Bill Howatson stepped down in Autumn 2014.The Deputy Chief Executive, Dr Pauline Strachan and the Director of Nursing both retired following the publication of the HIS report in November 2014. A number of clinicians called on other executives to consider their positions.

In 2018, following Malcolm Wright's resignation as chief executive, NHS Grampian appointed Amanda Croft on an interim basis, who was then confirmed as new chief executive in April 2019. In June 2020 Croft announced her intention to retire at the end of 2020. She was succeeded by Caroline Hiscox, taking over the position in November 2020. In April 2021, NHS Grampian invested £3.5m in three surgical robots to assist general surgery at Aberdeen Royal Infirmary and hip replacement surgery at Woodend Hospital. Robotic-assisted surgery was first introduced to NHS Grampian in 2015. In June 2025, Laura Skaife-Knight was appointed as the new Chief executive, starting in September that year.

Reports of poor performance and avoidable patient deaths at Dr Gray's hospital in Elgin and Aberdeen Royal Infirmary led to a report by Healthcare Improvement Scotland.

== Healthcare in community settings ==
In 2007 the board stated their ambition to deliver care in local communities wherever possible. To achieve this the preferred choice would be to treat patients in primary or community settings (GP practices, health centres and community hospitals).

The health board is served by 89 GP Practices There are various other specialist care teams that work in community settings.

There are 17 community hospitals across Grampian where care is provided including a large urban facility, the Aberdeen Community Health and Care Village, which opened in 2013. Of all the health boards in Scotland, Grampian has the highest concentration of community hospitals, although they all differ in the type of services that they offer.

== Specialist acute hospitals ==
There are several specialist acute hospitals in the NHS Grampian region, the largest being Aberdeen Royal Infirmary, located on the Foresterhill Health Campus. Royal Aberdeen Children's Hospital and Aberdeen Maternity Hospital are also located at Foresterhill. Also located within Aberdeen are Woodend Hospital, a general hospital which houses the Department of Medicine for the Elderly among other services; Royal Cornhill Hospital, a psychiatric hospital; and City Hospital, the location of the specialist Links Unit and several out-patient clinics.

Dr Gray's Hospital is located in Elgin, Moray and is the main district hospital for that area. Also located in Elgin is The Oaks, a palliative care day hospital.

About 3% of the hospital activity in Grampian is providing treatment for people who live outwith the Grampian area.

== Performance ==
Between April 2014 and February 2015 the board paid out almost £3 million to private hospitals for the treatment of more than 1000 patients in order to meet waiting time targets. In October 2021, during the COVID-19 pandemic, Grampian NHS was the third NHS board to apply for support from the Army, preferentially with healthcare staff.

A report by Healthcare Improvement Scotland in 2026 criticised the Health Board for "Major deficiencies" and a "Culture of fear" that created by poor leadership. Skaife-Knight accepted the report and apologised. A Surgeon at ARI, Dr Mohammed Habib, alleged that avoidable complications in surgery at the hospital had led to 19 patient deaths.
