= Aberdeen Royal Infirmary =

- NHS Grampian
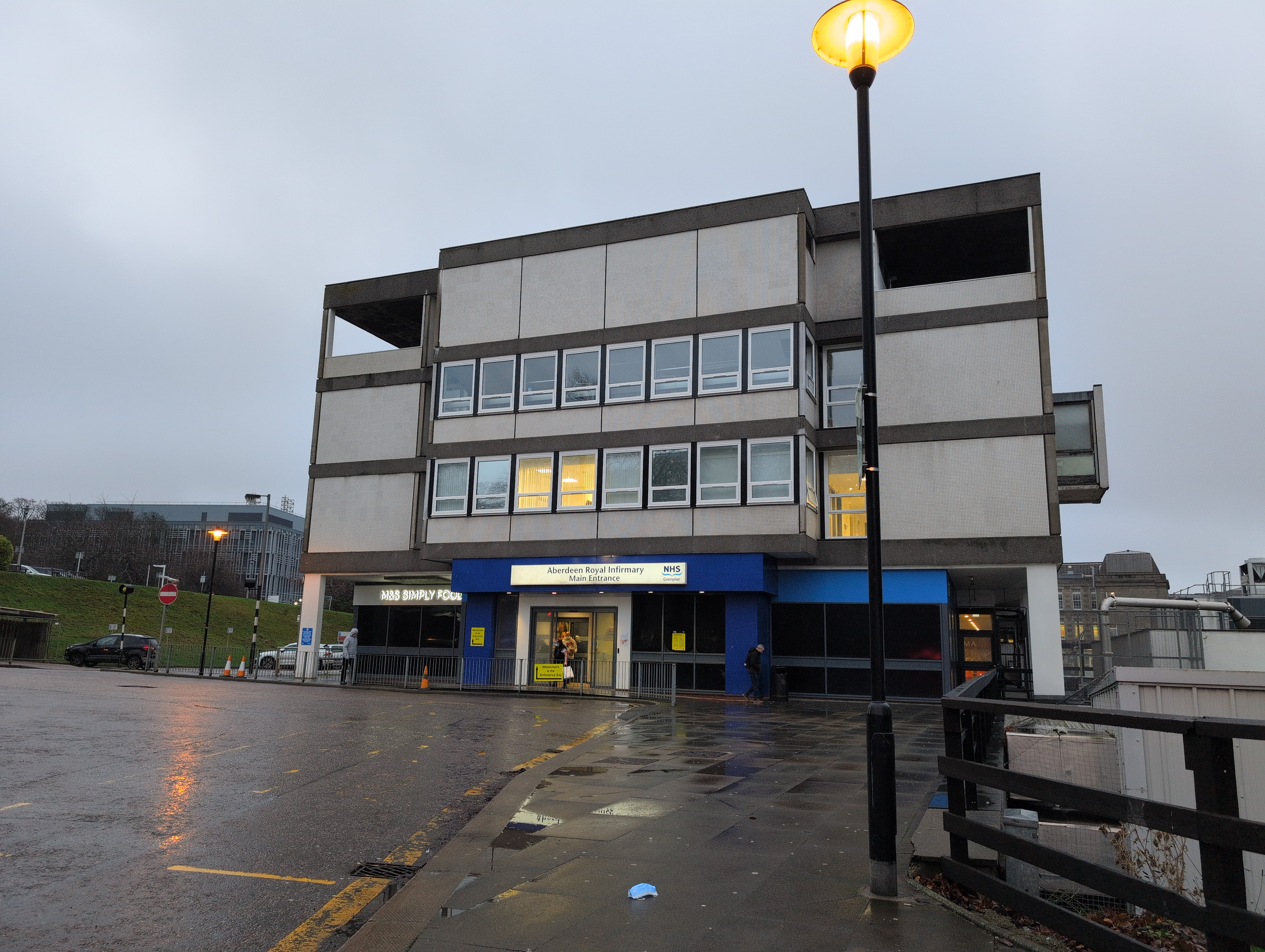
- Main entrance to the Infirmary (2025)

- Shown in Aberdeen

Geography
- Location: Foresterhill, Aberdeen, Scotland
- Coordinates: 57.1546°N 2.1360°W

Organisation
- Care system: NHS Scotland
- Type: Teaching
- Affiliated university: University of Aberdeen; Robert Gordon University

Services
- Emergency department: Yes – Major Trauma Centre

History
- Founded: 1737

Links
- Website: Website
- Lists: Hospitals in Scotland

The Aberdeen Royal Infirmary (ARI) is the largest hospital in the Grampian area, located on the Foresterhill site in Aberdeen, Scotland. The ARI is a teaching hospital offering tertiary care for a population of over 600,000 across the north-east of Scotland. It offers all medical specialities with the exception of heart and liver transplants. It is managed by NHS Grampian.

== History ==
The Aberdeen Royal Infirmary has it origins in a facility established at Woolmanhill in 1739. The move to the current site formed part of the Aberdeen Joint Hospitals Scheme as envisaged by the Scottish doctor Matthew Hay, which involved the development of an integrated medical campus at Foresterhill. The granite buildings on the site were designed by James Brown Nicol. The hospital was officially opened by the Duke and Duchess of York on 23 September 1936—King Edward VIII had been due to open the infirmary but he called off his visit and instead went to Ballater railway station to meet the American socialite Wallis Simpson off her train. The first patients were admitted a month later. The hospital joined the National Health Service in 1948.

In the 1980s the English physicist John Mallard led a team which built the first whole body magnetic resonance imaging (MRI) scanner. The world's first whole-body MRI scanner was used for diagnostic imaging between 1980 and 1983. The prototype machine, Mark One, was put on display in the hospital's art gallery in February 2016. Following fundraising by Evening Express readers, in 1992 a Siemens scanner costing £870,000 was brought. In 1984, a hyperbaric oxygen unit was built for the treatment of decompression illness and the hospital's in vitro fertilisation unit achieved a number of successful pregnancies in 1985, its first year of operation. In 1986, a new £550,000 out-patient eye clinic opened, offering corrective laser eye surgery, and in 1989, the hospital introduced a breast cancer screening service for women over the age of 50, with X-rays taken every three years.

In 2013, a £110m emergency care centre development was completed. This was the first time that the Foresterhill campus had hosted emergency and urgent care facilities in the same building, and 75% of the beds in the centre are single-occupancy. In February 2014, it was revealed that the hospital has a repairs backlog of £60 million. On 26 June 2014, John Swinney, the then Finance Secretary, announced a £120 million investment for a new cancer centre and maternity hospital on the site. In 2016, the ARI became one of four major trauma centres as part of a national major trauma network in Scotland.

== Services ==
Social workers can be contacted in the hospital, and a branch of the Citizens Advice Bureau is based there. The hospital is served by the volunteer-run radio station, Grampian Hospital Radio.

== Transportation ==
The hospital is served by several bus services with regular connections to Aberdeen city centre and service to places as far as Inverurie and Oldmeldrum in the north, Inverness in the West and Cove Bay in the south. A new multistorey carpark with space for over 1,000 cars was opened in 2017.

== Research ==
There are close links with the University of Aberdeen's medical school and there has been pioneering research in many fields, including the development of MRI and positron emission tomography (PET) scanning. A new PET scanner was installed in 2006.

The ARI has been one of the centres evaluating telemedicine equipment and developing services in Scotland.

== Performance ==
The Academy of Medical Royal Colleges and Faculties in Scotland produced a report entitled "Learning from serious failings in care" in July 2015. The investigation was launched after scandals in the health service in 2013 and 2014 leading to concerns about patient safety and care at the infirmary. They found leadership and accountability were often lacking and bullying was endemic. The 20 recommendations for improvements in the NHS included a set of minimum safe staffing levels for consultants, doctors, nurses and other staff in hospital settings. They criticised a target driven culture, saying: "Quality care must become the primary influence on patient experience... and the primary indicator of performance."
