= Woodend Hospital =

- NHS Grampian
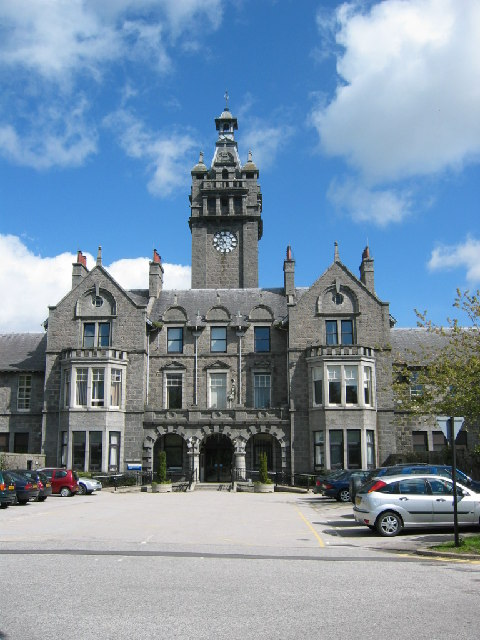
- South Block, Woodend Hospital

- Shown in Aberdeen

Geography
- Location: Eday Road, Aberdeen, Scotland, United Kingdom
- Coordinates: 57.1484°N 2.1732°W

Organisation
- Care system: NHS Scotland
- Type: Community
- Affiliated university: University of Aberdeen; Robert Gordon University; Queen Margaret University

Services
- Emergency department: No Accident & Emergency

Links
- Website: NHS Grampian- Woodend Hospital
- Lists: Hospitals in Scotland

Woodend Hospital is a health facility located in the Woodend area of Aberdeen, Scotland. It is managed by NHS Grampian.

== History ==
The hospital, which was designed by Brown & Watt, opened as the Old Mill Poorhouse and Infirmary in May 1907. It became a military hospital during the First World War. The hospital was taken over by Aberdeen Town Council and reopened as Woodend Municipal Hospital in October 1927. A special block was erected for the treatment of non-pulmonary tuberculosis, pneumonia and similar cases. A new nurses' home was added in 1936 and the hospital joined the National Health Service in 1948. During the 1964 Aberdeen typhoid outbreak, over 400 cases were diagnosed and the patients were quarantined at the City Hospital and Woodend Hospital, although no fatalities resulted.

== Services ==
The hospital provides out-patient services including clinics, elective orthopaedic surgery, rehabilitation and care of the elderly services.
