= John Menzies Campbell =

Scottish dental historian (1887–1974)

John Menzies Campbell FRSE FDS RCSEd
- Born: 9 June 1887; Paisley, Scotland
- Died: 27 June 1974 (aged 87); Edinburgh, Scotland
- Education: George Watson's College, Edinburgh
- Alma mater: Anderson's College, Glasgow; University of Toronto
- Occupation: Dental surgeon
- Known for: Menzies Campbell dental collection A Dental Bibliography, British and American, 1682-1880
- Spouse: Margaret Williamson Shirlaw

John Menzies Campbell FRSE FDS RCSEd, DDS (9 June 1887– 27 June 1974) was a Scottish dentist and dental historian who became a collector of dental books, paintings and dental instruments. At the time of his death he had amassed what was regarded as one of the largest collections of dental memorabilia in the world. He bequeathed his collection of pictures and instruments to the museum of the Royal College of Surgeons of Edinburgh (RCSEd) where it formed the Menzies Campbell Dental Museum, and is now known as the Menzies Campbell Collection. His books and dental advertisements were left to the Royal College of Surgeons of England (RCSEng).

== Life ==
He was born in Paisley, Scotland on 9 June 1887, the son of John Menzies Campbell, an inspector of the poor, and his wife Agnes.

He attended George Watson's College in Edinburgh before studying dentistry firstly at the Anderson College in Glasgow, then St Mungo's College and then the Glasgow Dental School. He then served a dental apprenticeship under J.G. Angus, and qualified as a Licentiate in Dental Surgery (LDS) in 1911. The following year he travelled to Toronto, Canada for further studies, qualifying Doctor of Dental Surgery (DDS) from the University of Toronto in 1912. He then returned to Scotland to spend over 40 years as a successful dentist operating from 14 Buckingham Terrace in Glasgow.

While studying in Toronto he was inspired by the teaching of Dr G.M. Hermiston, lecturer in the history of dentistry. For the rest of his life he became an avid collector of dental books and instruments and of pictures and advertisements relating to dentistry. He had a particular interest in the issue of dental pain, regarding it as an entity separate from pain elsewhere in the body.

His contribution to the history of dentistry was recognised at an early stage so that In 1918 he was elected a Fellow of the Royal Society of Edinburgh, an unusual honour for a 31 year old. His proposers included Sir George Andreas Berry and fellow dentist William Guy.

His book A Dental Bibliography, British and American, 1682-1880 is still regarded as a seminal work. Dentistry Then and Now which ran to three editions was a series of vignettes into aspects of dental history.

He instituted a triennial lecture series at the Faculty of Dental Surgery of the RCSEng in 1959, and donated his personal library to that College in 1964. In recognition of this he was made the first Honorary Fellow in Dental Surgery of the RCSEng. In the same year he donated his collection of instruments and pictures to the RCSEd.

His collection of instruments, memorabilia and paintings is now held at the Surgeons' Hall Museum in Edinburgh, and has been described as being one of the finest in the United Kingdom. The extensive collection of pictures gives a vivid representation of dentistry through the ages, displaying both competent and incompetent operators. The oldest pictures are 16th century but most are from the 18th and 19th centuries . The collection includes a portrait of the 18th century society dentist Bartholomew Ruspini, attributed to Nathaniel Hone, R.A.. Prominent among the cartoons depicting dental themes is coloured lithograph by Thomas Rowlandson shows tooth transplantation from a young sweep into the mouth of a fashionable lady. The collection includes dentures. Some of these carry teeth carved in ivory while others include human teeth which were usually collected from battlefields or by body-snatching (prior to the 1832 Anatomy Act).

His eminence as a dental historian was recognised by the American Academy and the French Society of the History of Dentistry. In 1952 he was awarded an Honorary Doctorate of Law from the University of Toronto.

Menzies Campbell died in Glasgow on 27 June 1974.

== Family ==
He married Margaret Williamson Shirlaw (1893-1990) in December 1924.

Shirlaw graduated MB ChB from University of St Andrews School of Medicine in 1918, and went on to work as a house surgeon at Doncaster Royal Infirmary. She later joined her maternal aunt, Marion Gilchrist, in practice at 5 Buckingham Terrace, Glasgow.

After their marriage, they worked together on dental history, a practice she continued even after his death.

== Selected publications ==
- A Dental Bibliography, British and American, 1682-1880 (1949)
- Dentistry as Practiced 1820-1921 (1955)
- Dentistry Then and Now (1963)
- The Making of a Dentist: The 1900s (1968)
