= Margaret Campbell =

Margaret Campbell may refer to:

- Margaret Campbell (actress) (1883–1939), American character actress in silent films
- Lady Margaret Campbell (fl. 16th century), wife of John Erskine, 5th Lord Erskine
- Margaret W. Campbell (1827–1908), American suffragist
- Margaret Campbell (1888–1952), British novelist who wrote mainly as Marjorie Bowen
- Margaret Menzies Campbell (1893–1990), Scottish surgeon and general practitioner
- Margaret Campbell, Duchess of Argyll (1912–1993), socialite, spendthrift and libertine
- Margaret Campbell (politician) (1912–1999), Canadian politician
- Margarett Campbell (born 1955), member of the Montana House of Representatives
- Margaret C. Campbell, American professor of marketing
- Margaret Campbell, Jamaican sprinter in the 1980 Central American and Caribbean Junior Championships in Athletics
