= Margaret Menzies Campbell =

Scottish surgeon (1893–1990)

Margaret Menzies Campbell FRSE FDS
- Born: Margaret Williamson Shirlaw; 21 July 1893; Holytown, Lanark, Scotland
- Died: 1990 (aged 96–97); Glasgow
- Education: University of St Andrews
- Occupations: Surgeon, General Practitioner, Historian
- Years active: 1918–1989
- Known for: Historical research on women's medical education and practice in Scotland and dentistry
- Spouse: John Menzies Campbell (m. 1924)
- Parents: James Shirlaw (father); Agnes Gilchrist (mother)
- Relatives: Marion Gilchrist (aunt)

Margaret Williamson Menzies Campbell FDS FRCSE (née Shirlaw; 21 July 1893 – 1990) was a Scottish surgeon and general practitioner, who is known for her work as an historian of women's medical education and practice and dentistry.

== Early life and education ==
Margaret Williamson Shirlaw was born in Carfin, North Lanarkshire, on 21 July 1893 to Agnes and John Shirlaw. Her mother was the older sister of Dr Marion Gilchrist. Agnes named her daughter Margaret after their own mother, Margaret Gilchrist (née Williamson). On her birth record, her father is listed as the manager of Carfin Farm; however, by the 1911 census, the family had moved to Darlington, County Durham.

She attended University College Dundee. She then studied at University of St Andrews School of Medicine, graduating with an MB ChB in 1918; during her time at St Andrews, she founded the Bute Medical Society. She was the Society's first president.

== Career ==
A month after her graduation, she was appointed as a house surgeon at Doncaster Royal Infirmary in August 1918. She was the first woman to hold this post at the institution. One of her cases made the newspapers, showcasing the pressure the medical profession was under at the time, when a young woman, Elizabeth Pawson, died suddenly "whilst under an anaesthetic, during an operation for appendicitis".

Shirlaw had operated alone, except for a nurse, Sister Florence Milnes, who had administered the anaesthetic. During the inquest, Shirlaw explained that this situation was unusual, but was "owing to the shortage of doctors and the influenza epidemic". She testified that she had performed "between 200 and 400 operations since her appointment" in August 1918. The Coroner felt that he could not rule on the case entirely by himself, and called for a jury to attend on 18 March 1919.

They heard from Dr Reginald Wilson, a member of the honorary medical staff at the Infirmary, that performing the operation alone was "against the rules of the Infirmary in normal times, and against general practice". Dr Cleresby Wilson, another doctor, and also the hospital administrator, restated that the lack of doctors available to help Shirlaw was due to the war during his testimony. The jury ruled that Pawson's death had been due to her poor overall health. They added a rider that no blame should be attached to Shirlaw, nor any of the other hospital staff, but suggested that in future a medical practitioner be called in to administer the anaesthetic.

She continued to work in Doncaster for another two years, when she returned to Glasgow and joined her aunt, Marion Gilchrist, in general practice, based at 5 Buckingham Terrace.

She is also listed at this time as working at the Royal Hospital for Sick Children, Glasgow as a surgeon. She researched and wrote histories of women's medical education and practice in Scotland. She founded a Menzies Campbell lecture series, similar to the one started by her husband at the RCSEng Faculty of Dental Surgery at each of the three Scottish dental schools - Glasgow, Dundee and Edinburgh.

== Personal life ==
She married John Menzies Campbell, a dentist also based in Buckingham Terrace, on the 23 December 1924 at St. George's Presbyterian Church, Darlington.

Campbell was a collector or dental implements and an historian of dentistry. After their marriage, Margaret became his partner in this interest, and maintained it even after his death. She died in 1990.

Her uncle was the Scottish agriculturalist Douglas Alston Gilchrist.

== Awards and honours ==
In 1977, she was awarded an honorary Fellowship of the Faculty of Dental Surgery of the Royal College of Surgeons for her work on the history of dentistry. She was the first woman to receive this honour.

She was also made a fellow of the Royal College of Surgeons of Edinburgh.

== Selected works ==
The following works are available in the archives of University of Dundee, University of Glasgow and the Mitchell Library, Glasgow.

History of dentistry

- Advertisements with dates by practitioners who treated the poor gratis ... 1709-1850
- Dentists mentioned in Glasgow directories 1803-1850
- Pandora's box - the other side of the coin
- Aspects of dental history, Glasgow Dental Hospital centenary, 1879-1979
- Alexander Shiels, charlatan or genius?

History of women's medical education and practice

- Some Recollections of University and Early Days in Practice, 1912-1920
- The First World War: A House Surgeon Remembers
- Some Early Recollections of the Queen Margaret Medical School
- Three Scottish Women's Hospitals from their foundation until 1948
- The History of North Park House
- Redlands Hospital for Women, Glasgow women's private hospital, 1902–48

Women's rights

- A Right to Vote - Address given on the occasion of the opening of the exhibition "A Right to vote" at the People's Palace on 9 September 1978

Correspondence and papers

- Correspondence and Papers relating to Emily Thomson

A collection of her papers is held by Archive Services at the University of Dundee.
