= Harvey Littlejohn =

Professor of medical jurisprudence, police surgeon & medical officer of health

Henry Harvey Littlejohn FRSE
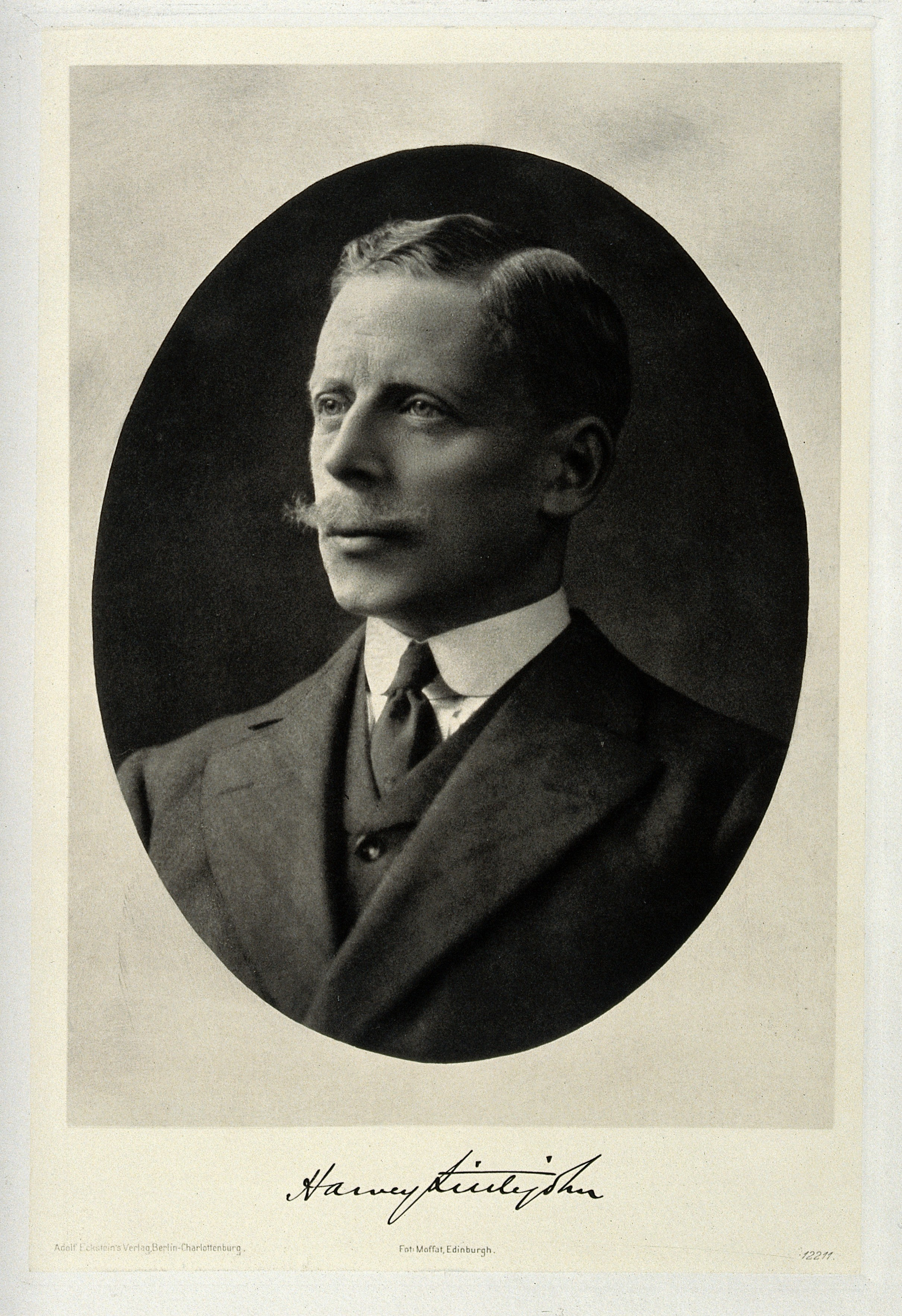
- Harvey Littlejohn
- Born: 7 October 1862; Edinburgh, Scotland
- Died: 15 August 1927 (aged 64); Edinburgh, Scotland
- Education: Edinburgh Academy; University of Edinburgh
- Occupation: Professor of medical jurisprudence
- Father: Henry Littlejohn
- Medical career
- Institutions: University of Edinburgh
- Notable works: Forensic Medicine. Illustrated by Photographs and descriptive Cases

Henry Harvey Littlejohn, FRCSEd, , FRSE (7 October 1862 – 15 August 1927) (widely known as Harvey Littlejohn ) was a Scottish academic, forensic scientist and medical officer of health, who followed in the footsteps of his father, Henry Duncan Littlejohn, as Professor of Medical Jurisprudence at the University of Edinburgh. This position also entailed acting as Police Surgeon to the City of Edinburgh and Advisor to the Crown. In this capacity he was called upon as an expert witness at high profile criminal cases.

== Early life and education ==
He was born at 40 York Place, Edinburgh on 7 October 1862, the son of Sir Henry Littlejohn and his wife Isabella Jane Littlejohn (née Harvey). He went to school at the Edinburgh Academy where he played rugby for the school. From an early age he was encouraged by his father to pursue a career in Public Health. and after taking a Master of Arts (MA) degree, he studied medicine at the University of Edinburgh qualifying MB CM in 1886. He then went on to a further qualification with a BSc in Public Health. During this time he served as senior president of the Royal Medical Society. He qualified as a Fellow of the Royal College of Surgeons of Edinburgh in 1890.

== Career ==
He began his career in public health by assisting his father both in the Department of the Medical Officer of Health and by lecturing in his father's Extramural class of Medical Jurisprudence at Surgeons' Hall. In 1891 he was appointed Medical Officer of Health for the City of Sheffield, returning to Edinburgh six years later as a Lecturer in Medical Jurisprudence in Surgeons' Hall. During this time, he established himself as a popular teacher.

He was appointed to the Chair of Medical Jurisprudence of the University of Edinburgh in 1906 succeeding his father. This carried with it the role of Police Surgeon to the City and Advisor to the Crown in criminal proceedings.

During the First World War he served as a major in the Royal Army Medical Corps, commanding the medical unit of the University of Edinburgh Officers' Training Corps.

As Police Surgeon he was able to enlarge the Forensic Medicine Museum which his father had started. In 1925 he was able to publish Forensic Medicine. Illustrated by Photographs and descriptive Cases. Many of the photographs were taken from the collection he had established in the museum. As Advisor to the Crown in criminal cases, he was frequently involved as an expert witness appearing as a witness for the Crown in some of the most important Scottish murder trials of that time.

Littlejohn adopted innovate methods to study public health. To track down the source of an outbreak of typhoid across Edinburgh in 1891 he created a detailed map showing the location of each case in conjunction with the noted Edinburgh map-maker, J. G. Bartholomew. The results, published in the Edinburgh Medical Journal in March 1891, showed several clusters of the infection. From the cluster in the Marchmont area, Littlejohn tracked the original source to a batch of milk from one individual farm, and had all milk destroyed, compensating the shop-owners. This technique is now common practice in public health.

In 1891 he was elected a member of the Harveian Society of Edinburgh. In 1902 he was elected a Fellow of the Royal Society of Edinburgh. His proposers were Sir William Turner, Alexander Crum Brown, and Sir Thomas Richard Fraser. In 1920 he was elected a member of the Aesculapian Club.

He was appointed Dean of the Medical Faculty, in which capacity he served on the University Court and on the General Medical Council.

== Later life and death ==
In later life Harvey Littlejohn lived at 1 Atholl Crescent in the west end of Edinburgh .

He died at a nursing home in Edinburgh on 15 August 1927. and is buried in his father's plot at Dean Cemetery.

== Selected publications ==
Text-Book of Forensic Medicine and Toxicology. Edinburgh : E. & S. Livingstone, 1915. (with Buchanan, Robert James McLean, Henry Aubrey Husband,)

Forensic Medicine. Illustrated by Photographs and descriptive Cases London: Churchill, 1925.
