= Ardlamont mystery =

1893 murder case in Argyll, Scotland

The Ardlamont Mystery (also known as the Ardlamont Murder and the Monson Case), was the death by shooting of Cecil Hambrough in Argyll, Scotland, on 10 August 1893. Defendant Alfred John Monson received the Scottish verdict of "not proven" in his High Court of Justiciary trial for the murder of Hambrough in HM Advocate v Monson. In 1894, Monson sued Madame Tussauds in Monson v Tussauds Ltd for libel and was awarded one farthing (the lowest possible amount at the time) in damages. The case established the principle of "libel by innuendo" in English law, and Monson v Tussauds Ltd has been used to draw up defamation laws in many countries since.

A notorious case at the time, the murder trial received renewed attention when it was noted that two pioneering forensic experts, Joseph Bell and Henry Littlejohn, had been called as expert witnesses, both of whom have been considered the inspiration for the fictional detective Sherlock Holmes.

== Background and incident ==
Alfred John Monson was born in 1860 the son of Reverend Thomas John Monson and his wife the Hon. Caroline Isabella Monckton, daughter of the 5th Viscount Galway. He married Agnes Maude Day in 1881. In 1891, Monson began working as a gentleman's tutor for the Hambrough family of Pipewell Hall, Northamptonshire and Steephill, Isle of Wight.

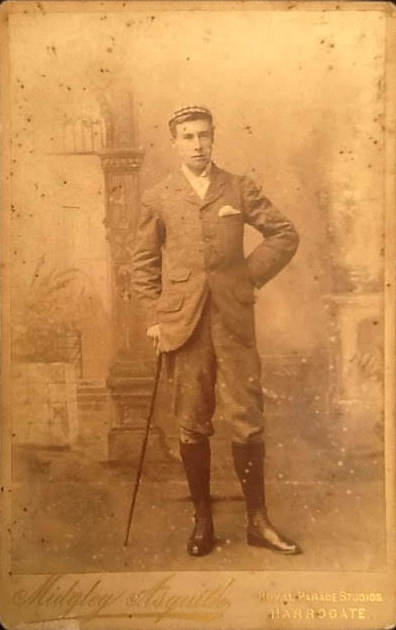
Windsor Dudley Cecil Hambrough 1873-1893.

Monson's pupil was the 20-year old Windsor Dudley Cecil Hambrough, born in 1873. While the Hambroughs had been wealthy, by the time of the incident the family was effectively bankrupt but still lived the life of the gentry on borrowed money. In 1893, Monson took the lease on the Ardlamont estate in Argyll for the shooting season. Hambrough joined him there, having previously lived with Monson, his wife and three children at Risley Hall, Yorkshire for his education. While it later emerged Hambrough had been having an affair with Mrs Monson at Risley Hall, and the Monsons divorced as a result, this was not known at the time of the murder trial.

On 10 August 1893, Monson took Hambrough for a day's hunting in an area of woodland on the estate. A third man joined the shooting party who called himself Edward Scott, a friend of Monson. Scott claimed to be a boating engineer, but in reality he was a bookmaker's clerk from London named Edward Sweeney. Monson and Hambrough carried a 20-gauge and 12-gauge shotgun, respectively; the plan was for Scott to gather any game they shot.

At some point during the day, estate workers heard a shot. Monson and Scott were then seen by workers at Ardlamont House, who later testified they saw both men running back to the house carrying guns, which they proceeded to clean in full view of staff. When asked where Hambrough was, they replied that he fell while climbing over a wall, and the shotgun had accidentally discharged its load into his head, killing him instantly. Monson stated he was some distance away in another part of the wood when the shot was fired, and Scott was not carrying a gun. Estate workers carried Hambrough's body back to the house, and local doctor John MacMillan was sent for. MacMillan detected a distinct smell of whisky on Hambrough and found a small entry wound, which suggested the gun's muzzle had been near the man's head when it was discharged.

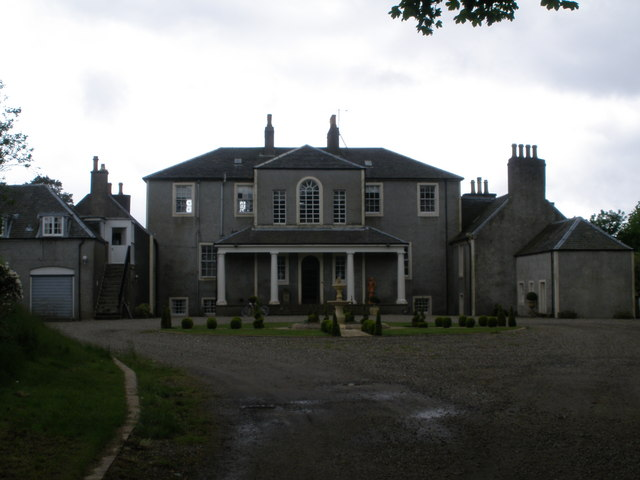
Ardlamont House in 2009

== Investigation and trial ==
When the incident was reported, a member of the Inveraray procurator fiscal's office was sent to the estate. He concurred with the doctor that Hambrough's death was a tragic accident; there was no formal post mortem. However, two weeks later, Monson appeared at the fiscal's office to report that Hambrough had taken out two life insurance policies worth £20,000 only six days before he died, and that they were made out in the name of Monson’s wife. These had been brokered by Monson's friend Arthur Sebright, a mortgage and insurance broker, who had met them earlier that year and discussed possible life insurance and trust deeds, and also joint financial ventures to take effect after Hambrough turned 21, when he was due to inherit £200,000. After thorough searches of the estate and interviews with staff, Monson was charged with murder. Scott, now on the run, was named as his accomplice.

The trial began in December 1893 among a media frenzy: more than 100 journalists covered the proceedings, with The Scotsman devoting an average of 20 columns to the case every day. Among the witnesses for the prosecution were University of Edinburgh surgeons and forensic experts Joseph Bell and Henry Littlejohn, who had performed the autopsy and wound analysis. They believed that the fatal shot could not have come from Cecil's gun, an assessment they shared with ballistics expert Patrick Heron Watson. The three experts agreed that the shape of the wound did not correspond to Cecil's weapon, and that the assailant would have had to stand 8 to 10 feet away from the victim while firing the fatal shot. The Crown consequently argued that Monson had murdered Cecil Hambrough. However, sufficient doubt had been sown in the minds of the jury by Monson's advocate John Comrie Thomson, who presented Prof Matthew Hay as an expert witness who strongly contradicted the other experts. After deliberating for 73 minutes, the jury returned a verdict of "not proven", an option available in Scots law which was effectively an "acquittal with doubt". Monson was set free as a result.

Hambrough was buried in the churchyard at St Catherine's Church, Ventnor on the Isle of Wight, close to the family home.

Only weeks after the trial's conclusion, Monson published his own account of the case, titled The Ardlamont Mystery Solved, both in an attempt to clear his name and to make money. The pamphlet asserted that Hambrough's death was an accident, and that the authorities had concealed evidence which would have helped the defence. It also included a supposed diary of Edward Scott/Sweeney, who subsequently contacted the press to say this had been fabricated; his sentence of outlawry was lifted in May 1894.

== Libel by innuendo ==
In 1894 Madame Tussauds in London erected a waxwork of Monson at the entrance to its Chamber of Horrors, bearing a gun. Monson took exception, sued the company and was awarded one farthing in damages. The case, Monson v Tussauds, established the principle of "libel by innuendo", which has been used to draw up defamation laws in many countries since. To prove libel, there must be publication in permanent form, but this need not be in words. In a similar case in Australia in 1879, a defendant who had been acquitted sued Kreitmayer's waxworks for continuing to display an effigy of her; she was awarded one farthing in damages.

== Television dramatisation ==
BBC Scotland Television produced an adaptation based on the case and broadcast in 1984. Murder Not Proven: Open Season was scripted by the future novelist Peter May.
