= Marion Gilchrist =

Marion Gilchrist may refer to:

- Marion Gilchrist, British woman murdered in 1908, the case becoming a miscarriage of justice
- Marion Gilchrist (doctor) (1864–1952), Scottish doctor and women's suffrage activist
