= Matthew Hay =

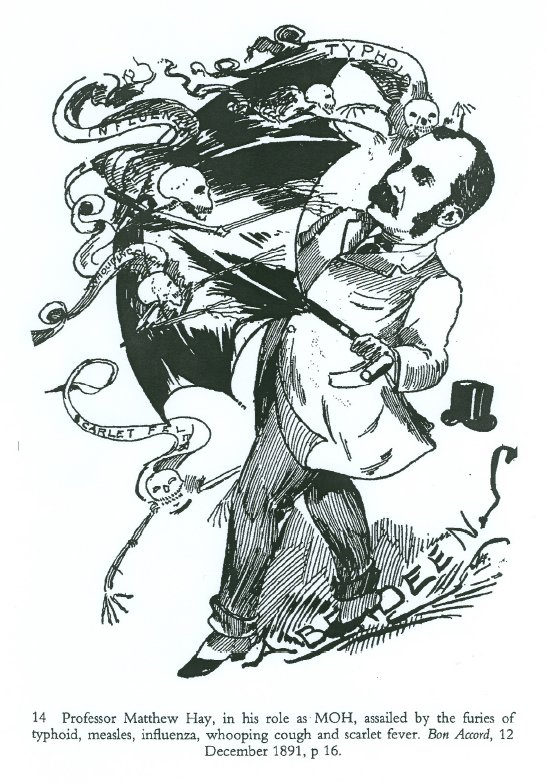
- Professor Matthew Hay ... assailed by the furies of typhoid, measles, influenza, whooping cough and scarlet fever
- Born: 1855; Denny, Scotland
- Died: 1932 (aged 76–77); Aberdeen, Scotland
- Education: University of Edinburgh
- Known for: Pioneer of medical education and public health
- Scientific career
- Fields: Public Health
- Workplaces: University of Aberdeen; Aberdeen City Council

Matthew Hay (1855–1932) was a Scottish medical doctor and champion of Public Health. He was appointed Medical Officer of Health for the City of Aberdeen in 1888, a post he held until 1923. He was also Professor of Forensic Medicine at the University of Aberdeen.

Matthew Hay was born at Hill Head, Denny, Stirlingshire on 27 December 1855. His father was a colliery owner. Hay was academically gifted attending Dollar Academy before going on to Glasgow and Edinburgh universities, graduating from the University of Edinburgh Medical School with the degree of MB, CM with distinction in 1878. At Edinburgh he distinguished himself by winning the Ettles prize for medicine and the Goodsir Fellowship and worked as an assistant to Richard Fraser, professor of Materia Medica. In 1884 Hay was offered and accepted the chair of pharmacology and therapeutics at Johns Hopkins University medical school, Baltimore. He did not take up the positions because of a dispute with Johns Hopkins over his intention to continue treating private patients. Baltimore's loss was to prove to be Aberdeen's gain when Hay, aged 27, successfully applied for the Chair of Forensic Medicine at Aberdeen University.

Hay's career in Aberdeen was not limited simply to the lecture theatres of the University. In 1888, he was appointed the city's Medical Officer of Health. It was in his capacity as the Medical of Health that Hay made an important contribution to solving the public health issues of Aberdeen's working class housing problem through the promotion of the Aberdeen (Housing of the Working Classes) Improvement Scheme 1894.

== Foresterhill ==
Professor Hay is known as the father of the Aberdeen Joint Hospitals Scheme. He promoted the development of an integrated medical campus at the Foresterhill site in Aberdeen. Central to his vision for a healthier community was the bringing together of health services for the public with a medical school on the one site, and in 1900 he pinpointed the barren slope of Foresterhill outside the city centre as the ideal location for his dream.

Having convinced the City Fathers of the need for this scheme, work begin on the Foresterhill site in 1926. Since then, Foresterhill has grown to become one of the largest health campuses in Europe, serving the communities of the north-east of Scotland, islands and beyond. The educational and research presence is strong on the site, with a large Medical School and new Institute of Medical Sciences and Institute of Applied Health Science. Matthew Hay's vision is fulfilled with the opening of the Suttie Centre for Teaching & Learning in 2009.

== Matthew Hay's role in Aberdeen's slum clearance ==
Since the enactment of the Public Health (Scotland) Act 1867 (30 & 31 Vict. c. 101), local authorities had been empowered to appoint Medical Officers (the term 'Medical Officers of Health' came into use later) and to raise money by local rates for public health purposes. Glasgow, Edinburgh and Aberdeen were exceptionally represented by three pioneering Medical Officers: James Burn Russell, Henry Littlejohn and Matthew Hay. These men laboured tirelessly to improve the public health and housing of the cities where they worked. Russell, or ‘Glasgow’s Doctor’, is today perhaps the best known of the three, whilst Hay (in relation to housing improvement) is the least remembered. The fact that Hay is not remembered today should not detract from his valuable contribution to the development of public health and Aberdeen's programme of urban regeneration. Not only was he the originator of the Aberdeen Joint Hospitals scheme (a world first in the organisation of hospital care and medical teaching), but he was also a key figure in the working class housing improvement scheme adopted by Aberdeen Town Council in 1894. At the time of his death in 1932, Hay's national importance was in no doubt. In his obituary, he was described as ‘one of the best known medical men in the Kingdom’ who would be remembered in Aberdeen:

for the excellent work he carried out while he was Medical Officer of Health for the city from 1888 to 1923. During the 35 years that he held that important post he carried out and paved the way for many important schemes for the general health and well-being of the city.

— The Scotsman 1 August 1932

Having served the city for 35 years, Hay was in a strong position to take the long view and he was eminently well qualified to assess the effectiveness of Aberdeen's response to the housing crisis. For example, in 1902, mid way into his term as Medical Officer, Hay presented a paper on the Glasgow Corporation Water and City Improvements Bill. In doing so, he spoke about the housing problem in Aberdeen where the city had closed slums down too rapidly without finding alternative accommodation for the displaced occupants. In his mind, the problem of homelessness had become so acute that the city had to re-open some slum properties. From 1850 onwards he argued that private enterprise had failed to deal with the city's chronic problem of overcrowded slums. He believed that private enterprise could not meet the housing needs of the poor because of their desire to make as much profit as possible. Additionally middle class landlords (who comprised the overwhelming majority of the city's renter class) tended to lease their properties to artisans rather than to the very poor because of the deleterious effect they feared the latter would have on those properties. In Hay's opinion, having cleared the slum properties, the private entrepreneur would not build to house the displaced occupants; he therefore believed that the Aberdeen Town Council should obtain the power to provide the accommodation to house the displaced population of the city. He was a vocal advocate of municipal intervention to solve the city's housing problem.

For social historians Hay's observations were typical of the time and reflected a dynamic change in the interaction between social problems, social thought and social action from the 1880s onwards and his work must be understood in the context of that change. As the population of Britain's cities grew, so too did the problem of housing the poor. Slum dwelling, the public health and public order issues that were associated with overcrowded and insanitary housing challenged the minds of philosophers, sociologists, charities, philanthropists, local government and national government for decades. Were the poor morally blameworthy for their own condition? Why were there slum dwellings? How were the poor to be housed and who had the responsibility for housing them? These were questions that went to heart of how the late Victorians and Edwardians understood the very nature of society. The proposed solutions evolved and illustrate that in studying the intellectual and social history of the period, it is difficult to establish a causal nexus between social thought and social action.

It is superficially attractive to presume that a particular social theory finds expression in social action and social change and that the historian is simply tasked with producing evidence from primary sources to find the link. This is an overly simplistic approach because it is based on an a priori assumption that ideas can be neatly compartmentalised and that their life span can be clearly delineated. In applying this to late Victorian and Edwardian Scotland there are no clear lines of demarcation in the history of ideas. There can be no precise moment when one social theory and its concomitant social action were supplanted by a different theory and a different action. Benthamism, laissez-faire, individualism, belief in God and the cult of ‘self-help’ and the moral quality of poverty were not simply replaced at one precise moment by collectivism, Social Darwinism, atheism/agnosticism and the acceptance of a paternalistic state in providing the essentials of life and promoting social justice. Instead there was a gradual development where different ideologies competed for supremacy as the ‘definitive’ tools for shaping social policy and for understanding the human condition and the nature of society.

From the 1880s onwards social thought and social action began to change in reaction to what was perceived as a national social crisis. It was a crisis borne out of a cyclical process of economic depression set against the background of Britain's relative economic decline in comparison to competitors such as the United States of America and Germany. Faced with the challenges of falling prices, tighter profit margins and greater competition, employers reacted by rationalising their labour requirements through mechanisation and an increasing reliance upon unskilled casual and sweated labour at the expense of the traditional craft workers. This, however, was not the only cause of the crisis. The agricultural depression in the 1870s led to a huge demographic shift in the population with mass migration from rural Scotland to urban Scotland. Furthermore, Irish immigrants in their tens of thousands flooded into the cities, particularly Glasgow. The Highland Scots and the Irish came to the cities largely as casual unskilled labour with little or no job security to compete in the existing labour market depressing wages and thereby enabling their employers to exploit them. In reaction to this, organised labour began to assert itself through increasing unionisation and industrial militancy. Socialism began to gain currency and challenged the traditional class relationships in British society.

Such fundamental social and economic changes inevitably led to a re-evaluation of poverty, the causes of the poverty, the relationship between the social classes and the threats to the status quo and the propertied classes that were posed by the burgeoning urban working class and the ‘residuum’. During the 1880s contemporary opinion began to recognise that these new city dwellers were prey to the powers of economic forces that were beyond their control. For example, the terms ‘unemployed’ and ‘unemployment’ started to gain currency as concepts that did not stigmatize the poor or attribute the causes of their condition to their own moral weaknesses. Unemployment and poverty began to be viewed not so much in Benthamite terms as an individual self-inflicted and morally questionable condition but the product of impersonal economic forces.

Along with the population explosion in the cities came a housing crisis. Casual employment demanded that individuals should live within walking distance of the sources of their work. In many cases, this meant living and working in the traditional centres of the cities. Notwithstanding the fact that many Victorian cities were expanding far beyond their traditional boundaries through suburban development, made possible by the growth of the railways, the corresponding flight to the suburbs was very much a facet of the expanding middle classes in the 1880s. By contrast, the inner city areas were turned into chronically overcrowded centres of insanitary housing unable to cope with the huge influx of people.

In attempting to solve the housing crisis the late Victorians and Edwardians were not simply engaged in a programme of improving the living conditions of those who lived in the slums, in fact the very poorest classes of slum dwellers were neither consulted nor substantially benefitted from the programmes of slum clearance and re-development. Programmes of slum clearance were principally concerned with the effects of the poor living conditions on the moral, physical, social and economic well-being of society. The late Victorians and Edwardians believed that lifestyles and living conditions were linked and they feared that the respectable poor would be contaminated by their close proximity to the residuum in the slums. The slums were believed to breed disease, crime, intemperance and immorality, external costs borne by wider society rather than the landlords and tenants of these properties. Writing about the moral evils of London's ‘rookeries’ in the 1880s, Andrew Mearns (who was widely read by the Scottish middle classes) observed:

Few who will read these pages have any conception of what these pestilential human rookeries are, where tens of thousands are crowded together amidst horrors which call to mind what we have heard of the middle passage of the slave ship... “Marriage”, it has been said, “as an institution, is not fashionable in these districts”... Ask if a man and woman living together in these rookeries are married, and your simplicity will cause a smile. Nobody knows, nobody cares. Nobody expects that they are... Incest is common; and no form of vice and sensuality causes surprises or attracts attention... Entire courts are filled with thieves, prostitutes and liberated convicts.

Hay approaching the housing issue from the perspective of public health. He was able to persuade the Town Council to depart from its traditional laissez faire view of the causes poverty (consistent with the social theories of Thomas Chalmers and Malthus), and to adopt the principles of municipal socialism as model for Aberdeen's housing.
