= Joseph Bell =

Scottish surgeon and lecturer

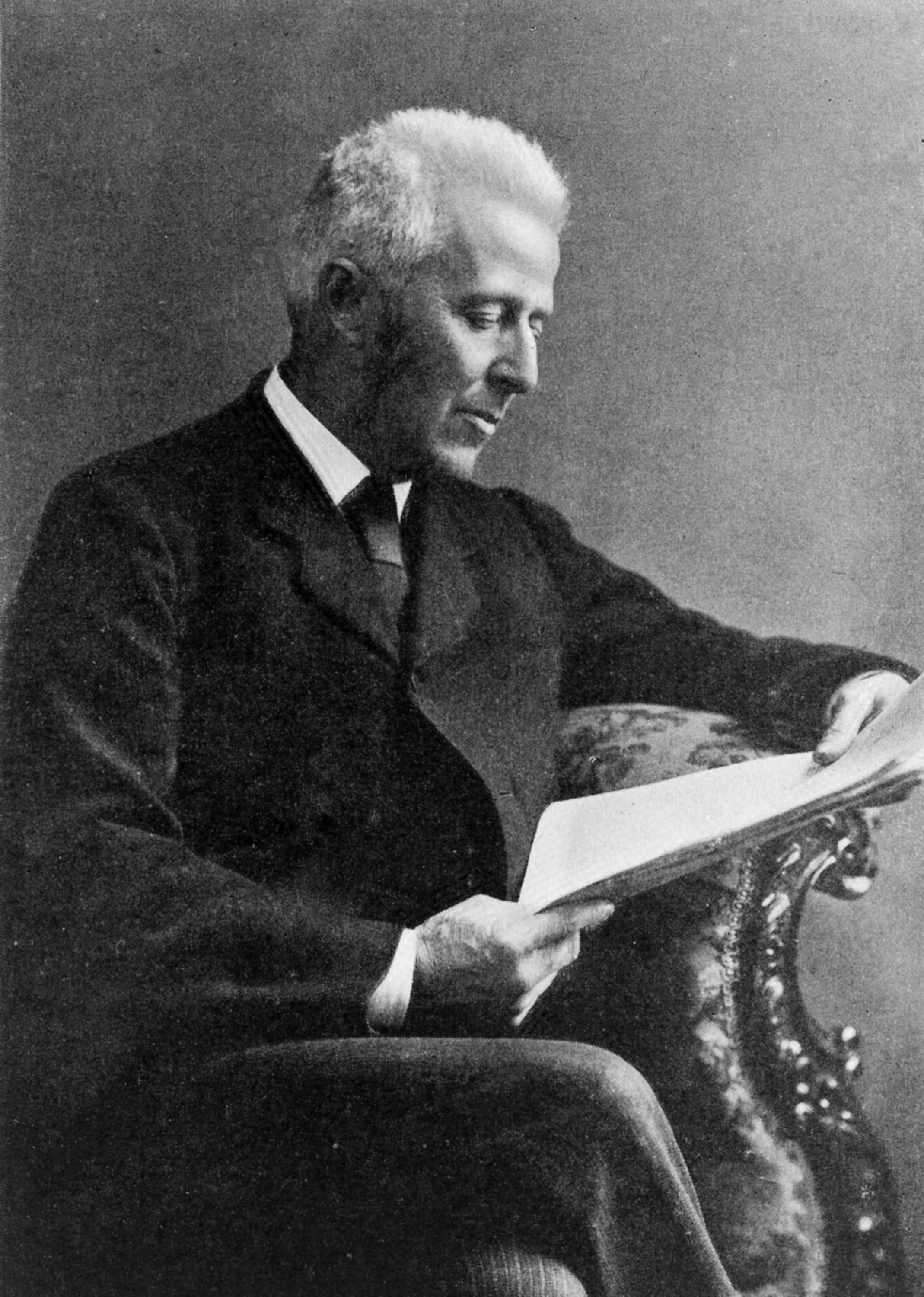
- Dr Joseph Bell
- Born: 2 December 1837; Edinburgh, Scotland
- Died: 4 October 1911 (aged 73); Milton Bridge, Midlothian, Scotland
- Resting place: Dean Cemetery, Edinburgh, Scotland
- Education: University of Edinburgh Medical School
- Spouse: Edith Katherine Erskine Murray
- Children: 5; three survived infancy

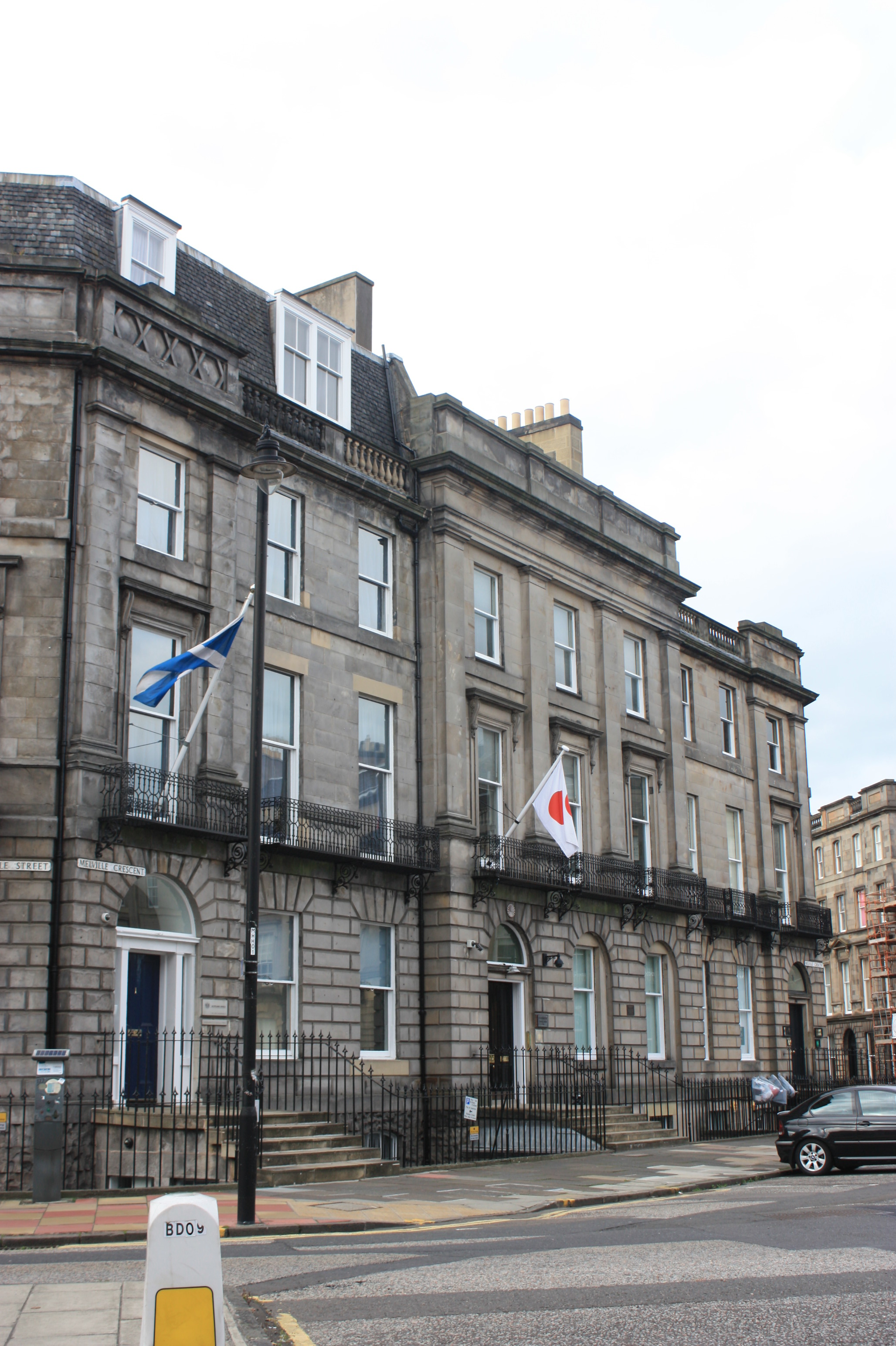
Bell's house in Melville Crescent, Edinburgh (centre)

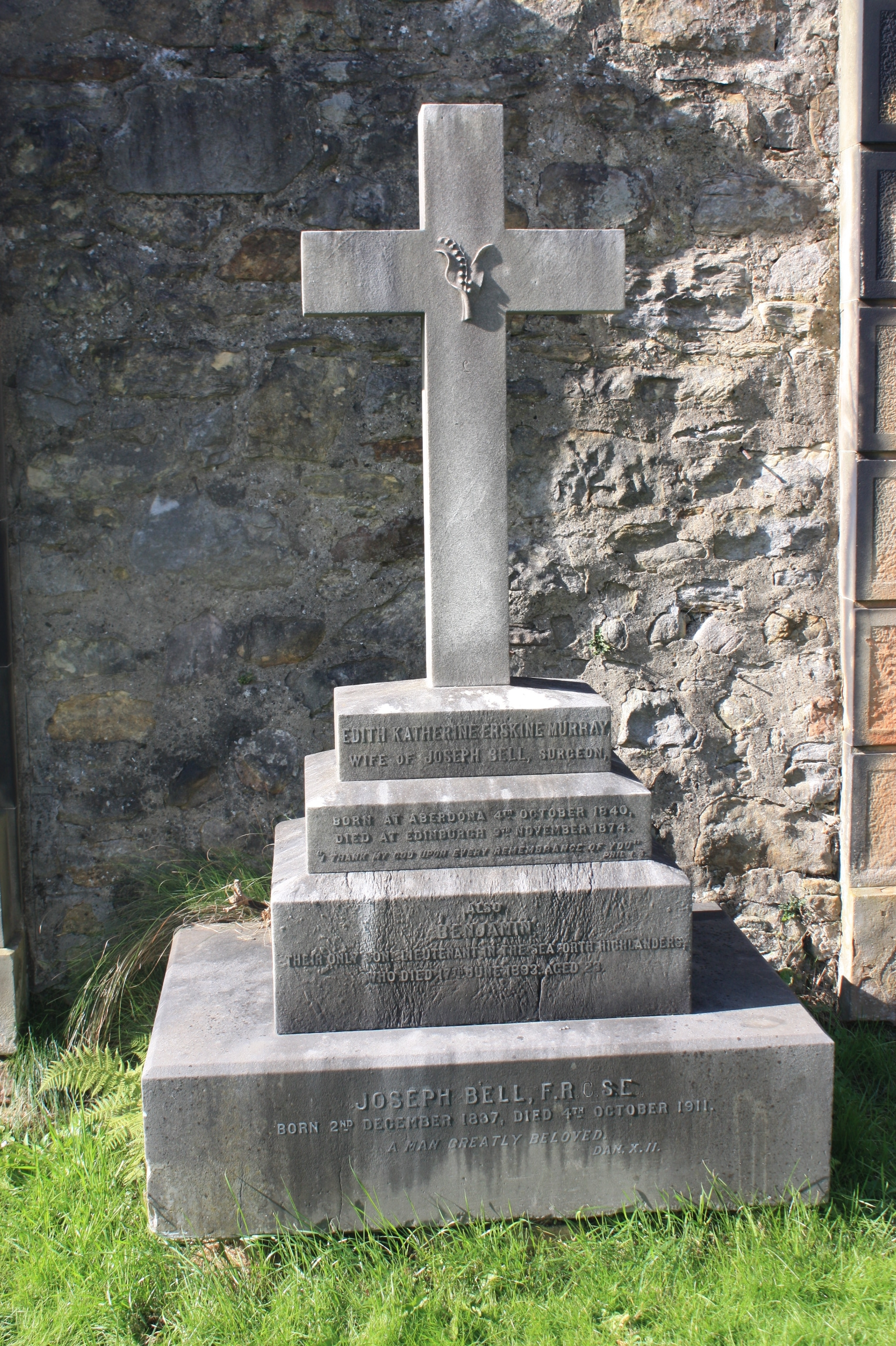
Dr Joseph Bell's grave, Dean Cemetery

Joseph Bell FRCSE (2 December 1837 – 4 October 1911) was a Scottish surgeon and lecturer at the medical school of the University of Edinburgh in the 19th century. He is best known as an inspiration for the literary character Sherlock Holmes.

== Early life ==
Bell was born in Edinburgh to Cecilia Barbara Craigie (1813–1882) and Benjamin Bell (1810–1883), the heir to a family tradition of medical distinction. He was a great-grandson of Benjamin Bell, considered to be the first Scottish scientific surgeon, and his father, grandfather, and great-uncle were all eminent doctors. Bell attended Edinburgh Academy, going on to study medicine at the University of Edinburgh Medical School in 1853, aged only 16. In 1859, he received a PhD with the thesis "Epithelial cancer: its pathology and treatment". In 1863, he was admitted to the Royal College of Surgeons of Edinburgh.

== Career ==
In his instruction, Bell emphasised the importance of close observation in making a diagnosis. A successful diagnosis, Bell taught students, needed a doctor to "observe carefully, deduce shrewdly, and confirm with evidence" – a technique which he termed "The Method". He demonstrated the process by bringing his out-patients – who he did not know – into lectures, where he then deduced their occupation, health, and recent activities from observation alone. In one instance, Bell accurately deduced that a woman had been to the Royal Botanic Garden Edinburgh from traces of red clay on her shoes, that she had left a child with a relative from the size of a coat she carried, and that she worked in a linoleum factory in Burntisland from dermatitis on her right hand. In another demonstration, Bell inferred that an elderly woman regularly smoked a short-stemmed pipe by noticing a small ulcer on her lower lip, and a glossy scar on her cheek. These skills led to him being considered a pioneer in forensic science (forensic pathology in particular), at a time when science was not yet widely used in criminal investigation.

In 1867, Bell was elected a member of the Harveian Society of Edinburgh and served as its president in 1897. In 1876, he was elected a member of the Aesculapian Club. He was elected President of the Royal College of Surgeons of Edinburgh in 1887.

Bell wrote several medical textbooks including the Manual of the Operations of Surgery, published in 1866.

== Personal life ==
In 1865, Bell married Edith Katherine Erskine Murray (1840–1874), daughter of the Hon. James Erskine Murray of the Elibank family. Together they had five children, three of whom survived infancy:

- Jane (or Jean) Isabella Erskine Murray McCance (née Bell) (18 January 1866 - 1923)
- Cecilia Craigie Stisted (née Bell) (7 December 1867 - 8 July 1955)
- Benjamin Bell (14 July 1869 - 17 June 1893)
- Katherine (or Catherine) Bell (27 June 1872 - ?)
- Stillborn son (1874)

In 1883, Bell bought 2 Melville Crescent, a large townhouse, previously the home of the engineer John Miller of Leithen.

Bell died on 4 October 1911. He was buried at the Dean Cemetery in Edinburgh alongside his wife Edith and their son Benjamin, and next to his parents' and brother's plots. The grave is midway along the north wall of the northern section to the original cemetery.

== Inspiration of Sherlock Holmes ==
Arthur Conan Doyle met Bell in 1877, and served as his outpatient clerk at the Edinburgh Royal Infirmary. Doyle observed that Bell seemed to be able to diagnose patients from little information, noticing minute details: "Dr Bell would [...] diagnose people as they came in, before they even opened their mouths. [...] He would tell them their symptoms and even give them details of their past life, and hardly ever would he make a mistake." When conceiving his fictional detective Sherlock Holmes, Doyle recalled: "I thought of my old teacher, Joe Bell, and of his eagle face, of his curious ways, or his eerie tricks of spotting details. If he were a detective, he would surely reduce this fascinating but unorganized business to something nearer to an exact science". Bell was aware of this inspiration, as Doyle wrote to him that it was "most certainly to you that I owe Sherlock Holmes".

Bell was involved in several police investigations, mostly in Scotland. Bell assisted in the investigation into the murder of Elizabeth Chantrelle in 1878, along with Edinburgh forensic expert Henry Littlejohn. In 1893, Bell and Littlejohn were called upon to investigate the Ardlamont mystery, and they conducted handwriting analysis to aid Scotland Yard in the Jack the Ripper murders.

== Dramatisation ==
The BBC television series Murder Rooms: The Dark Beginnings of Sherlock Holmes was a fictionalized account of Doyle's time as Bell's clerk. The series may have exaggerated Bell's criminal investigations as well as the degree to which Holmes was based on Bell (played by Ian Richardson), and it positioned Doyle in the role of a Dr. Watson to Bell's Holmes. The original one-off production, which led to the later series, was released on DVD and VHS in the US in 2003, titled Dr. Bell and Mr. Doyle – The Dark Beginnings of Sherlock Holmes.

In the Doctor Who episode "Tooth and Claw" in 2006, the time travelling adventurer known as the Doctor identifies himself as an ex-student of Bell to Queen Victoria.

The comic book Les dossiers du Professeur Bell by Joann Sfar is about the (fictional) supernatural adventures of Dr Bell.

In episode 11, Season 5, of the Fox TV show House M.D., Wilson presents House with Joseph Bell's Manual Of the Operations of Surgery as a Christmas gift. The character of House is based on Holmes, who, as noted, was based in turn on Bell. In episode 14 of the show's eighth and final season, House briefly comes to believe that his biological father is a man named Thomas Bell, played by prominent Scottish actor Billy Connolly.

The novel Mr. Doyle & Dr. Bell (1997) by Howard Engel is a fictionalized account of Joseph Bell and his influence on Conan Doyle.

In Elementary, an American procedural drama television series that was introduced as a contemporary update of Sir Arthur Conan Doyle's stories of Sherlock Holmes, Holmes and Watson often work with a Detective called Marcus Bell, which is likely a nod to the real-life Joseph Bell.

== Memorial ==
On 8 October 2011, the centenary of Bell's death, a bronze memorial plaque was erected at 2 Melville Crescent in Edinburgh, his home for his final decades. The plaque explains Bell's connection to Conan Doyle and Sherlock Holmes, and was organised and funded by the Japan Sherlock Holmes Club. The building is now the Japanese Consulate in Edinburgh.
