= Alice Robson =

Scottish medical doctor

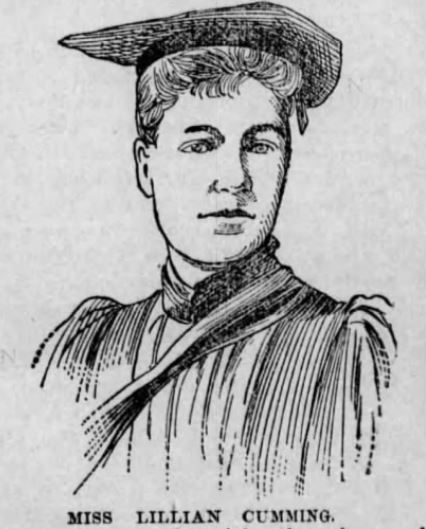
- Born: Alice Lilian Louise Cumming; 22 November 1870; Houston, Renfrewshire, Scotland
- Died: 4 July 1945 (aged 74)
- Occupation: Medical doctor
- Spouse: Henry Robson (m. 1901)
- Children: 4

Alice Lilian Louise Robson (née Cumming; 22 November 1870 – 4 July 1945) was a Scottish medical doctor and one of the first two women to be awarded a medical degree in Scotland.

== Early life and education ==
Alice Lilian Louise Cumming was born in Houston, Renfrewshire on 22 November 1870. Her father, James S. Cumming, was a general practitioner. She attended Queen Margaret College, studying arts before enrolling at Glasgow University to study medicine.

In 1894, Cumming received a Bachelor of Medicine and a Certified Midwife from the University of Glasgow. With Marion Gilchrist, she was one of the first two women who graduated in medicine in 1894. Robson graduated alongside doctor and suffragette Marion Gilchrist. They were first women to ever be awarded medical degrees in Scotland and they were featured in the international press.

The Journal of Education reported:

At the summer graduation ceremony of the University of Glasgow, held on 26th July, the degree of Bachelor of Medicine and Master in Surgery was conferred on women candidates for the first time in the history of any of the Scottish Universities. The two lady graduates who have had the honour of leading the van in this new departure are Miss Marion Gilchrist, Bothwell, and Miss Alice Lilian Louisa Cumming, Glasgow. Both have studied in Queen Margaret College, now the Women's Department of the University of Glasgow, for seven years, three in Arts and four in Medicine, their clinical work having been taken in the Royal Infirmary and Sick Children's Hospital... There was a large attendance of University students and of the general public at the ceremony and the two ladies were welcomed into the ranks of the Graduates in Medicine with much hearty and generous enthusiasm. Since graduation Miss Gilchrist has been appointed assistant to Dr Joseph McG. Robertson, a doctor in large practice in the West End of Glasgow; and Miss Cumming has accepted the post of Resident House Surgeon in the Eye Infirmary, Greenock.

It was written that Cumming would practice as an assistant in her father's practice in Blythswood Square, Glasgow.

In 1899, Cumming received a Doctor of Public Health from the University of Cambridge.

== Career ==
In 1904, Robson chaired a meeting of Ladies' Discussion Society. This was reported on by the Cambridge Independent Press, who referred to Robson as a "qualified medical woman". Robson worked for the Cambridge Charity Organisation Society and Addenbrooke's Hospital.

It is uncertain if Dr Robson practised medicine in Cambridge before the war, as she does not appear to be listed in the street directories as a physician up to this time. However The Cambridge Independent Press lists Mrs Robson appointed as a medical adviser to the Cambridge Charity Organisation Society. In the same paper there is one reference to a Dr Robson acting as an examiner with Dr Dorothy Hare at a Red Cross Nursing examination on Friday 14 January 1916, so it is possible they were contemporaries.
As early as 1915 the Addenbrooke’s Minutes report that the surgical team requested the use of women doctors to act as anaesthetists in order to meet the shortage of male doctors, called to the front. It was not until November 1919 that Mrs Robson was appointed. Other women were to join the team of anaesthetists but Mrs Robson is again mentioned in the hospital minutes in March 1929 when she offered her resignation after nine years. Interestingly she is reappointed in 1931 to join the team of auxiliary anaesthetists to be on hand to cover holidays.

— Addenbrooke's Archives (Addenbrooke's Hospital)

== Personal life ==
In 1901, she married Henry Robson, a Scottish mathematician and Fellow of Sidney Sussex College, Cambridge. Henry Robson later became the Bursar of Sidney Sussex College.

Alice and Henry Robson lived at 10 Park Terrace, Cambridge. They lived in Cambridge and had four daughters.
