= Faculty of Dentistry of the Royal College of Surgeons in Ireland =

Division of medical institution based in Dublin

Coordinates: 53.339151°N 6.263211°W

Royal College of Surgeons in Ireland
- Coláiste Ríoga na Máinleá in Éirinn
- Motto: Consilio Manuque (Scholarship and Dexterity)
- Type: Private
- Established: 11 February 1784
- Students: 1500
- Address: 123 St. Stephen's Green, Dublin, Ireland
- Campus: Urban
- Registrar President: Michael Horgan; Professor Gerald O'Sullivan FRCSI
- Affiliations: NUI, RCPI
- Website: http://www.facultyofdentistry.ie

The Faculty of Dentistry of the Royal College of Surgeons in Ireland was founded in 1963 with the core mission of advancing the science, art and practice of dentistry by the promotion of education, study and research.

The Faculty is responsible for setting standards of postgraduate training in both Ireland and other centres around the world.

The Faculty has more than 2000 Fellows and Members throughout the world.

== See also ==
- Faculty of Dental Surgery
- Royal College of Surgeons in Ireland
