= Murder of Elizabeth Chantrelle =

1878 murder case

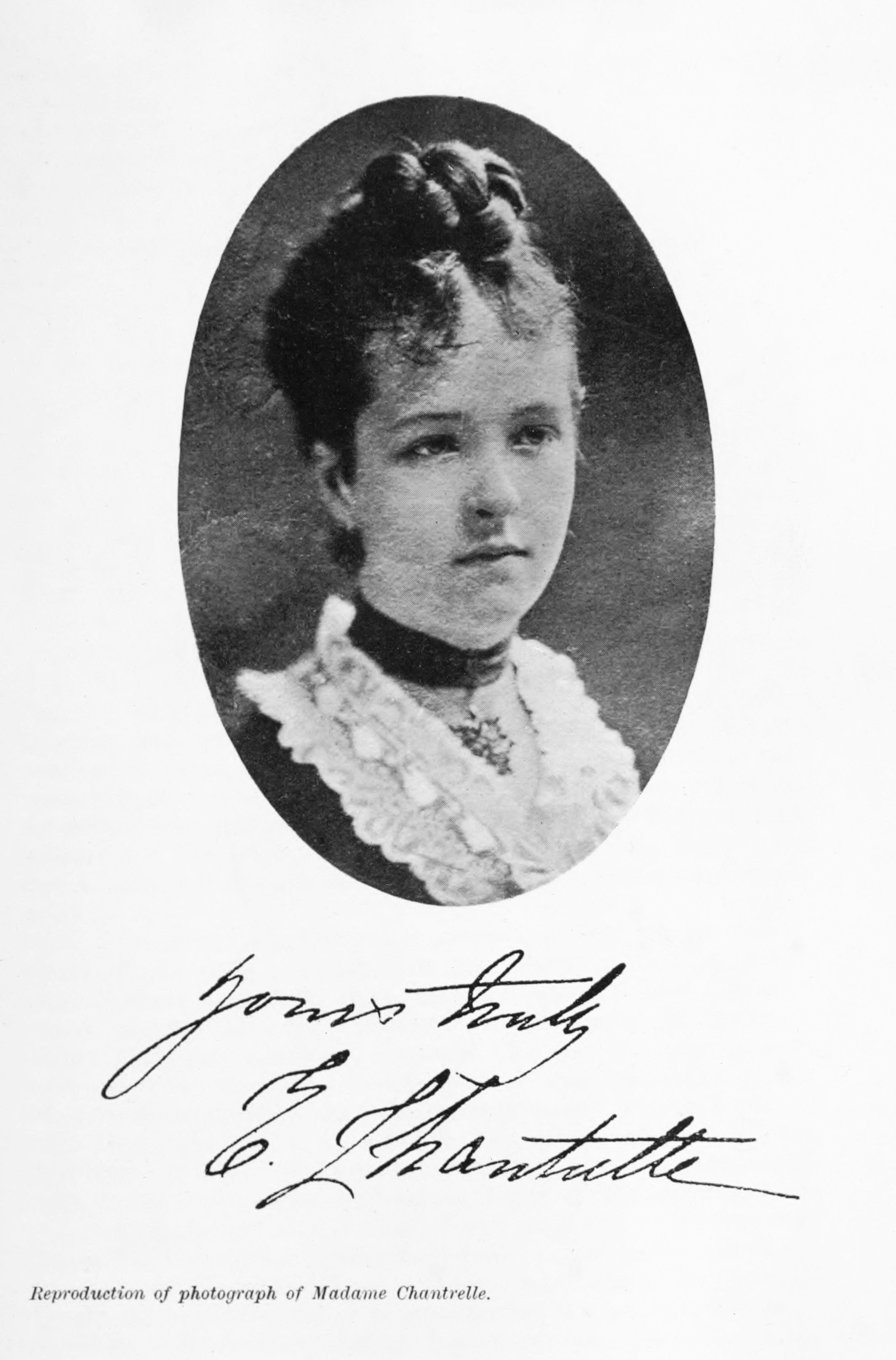
- Elizabeth Chantrelle c. 1876
- Location: Edinburgh, Scotland
- Date: 2 January 1878
- Attack type: Murder by poisoning
- Deaths: 1
- Victim: Elizabeth Chantrelle (née Dyer)
- Perpetrator: Eugène Marie Chantrelle
- Charges: Murder
- Verdict: Guilty

The murder of Elizabeth Chantrelle (née Dyer) was a crime committed by Frenchman Eugène Marie Chantrelle in 1878 in Edinburgh. Eugène was Elizabeth's former teacher who had married her when she was 17; on 2 January 1878, he murdered her by poison to collect a life insurance. He was convicted due to evidence collected by pioneering forensic experts Henry Littlejohn and Joseph Bell, and hanged at Calton Prison. The case is said to be one of the inspirations for Robert Louis Stevenson to write the literary classic Strange Case of Dr Jekyll and Mr Hyde.

== Background ==
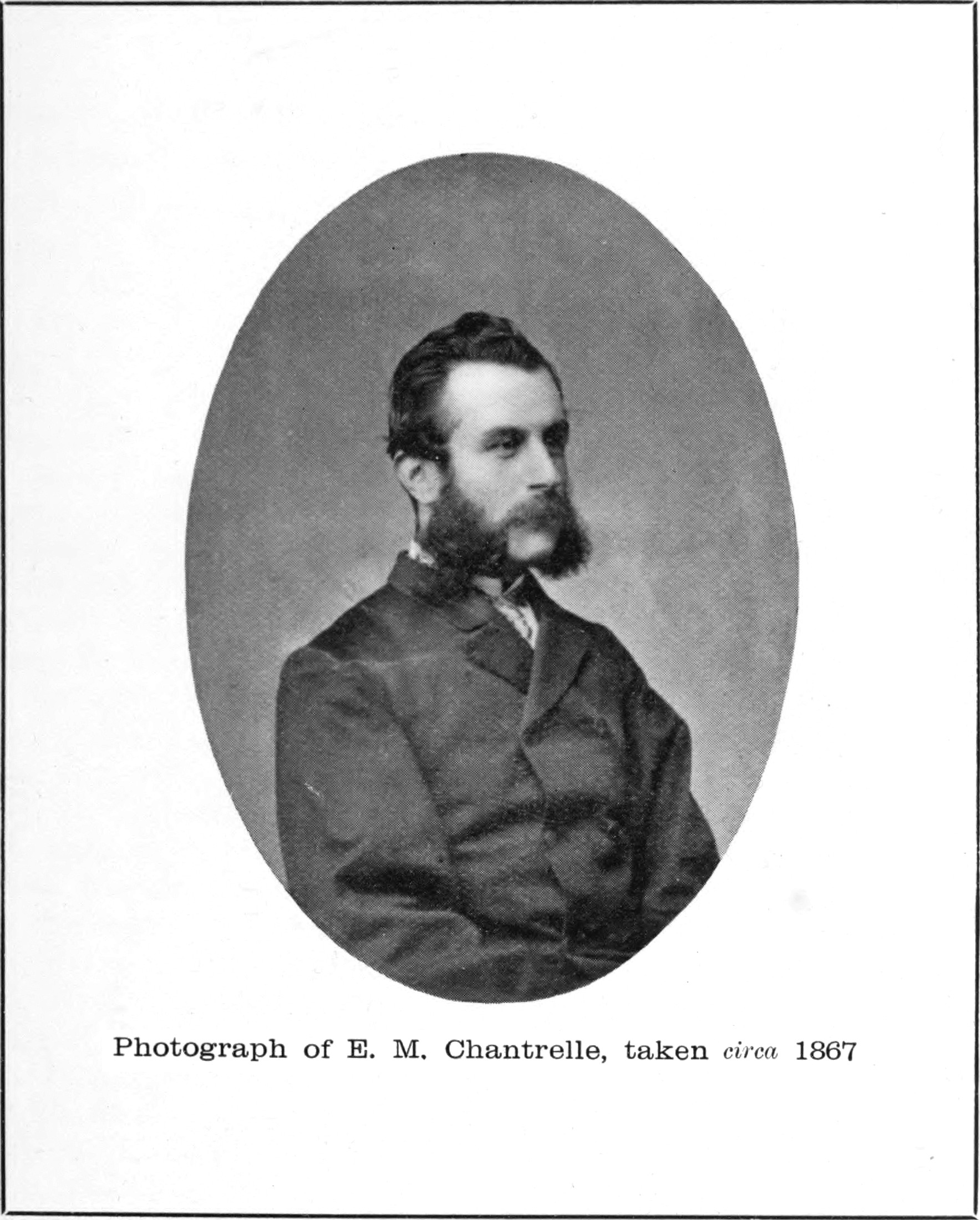
Eugène Chantrelle c. 1867

Eugène Chantrelle was born in 1834 in Nantes, and became a teacher of French at the private Newington Academy in Edinburgh. He began a relationship with a pupil, Elizabeth Cullen Dyer, who was born on 18 July 1851, and was 15 years old at the time. They married on 11 August 1868 when she was aged 17, and moved in together at 81a George Street. Elizabeth gave birth to their first child two months after they were married.

== Victimisation and murder ==
From the start, the marriage was not a happy one. His trial heard that, in addition to physical violence, he regularly threatened to poison her. On 18 August 1877, he took out a £1,000 life insurance policy against her accidental death. On the morning of 2 January 1878, Elizabeth was found unconscious in her room by her maid, who went to fetch a doctor. When they returned to the room, the maid noticed several oddities: a half-full glass of lemonade on the nightstand was now empty, some fruit were gone, and a smell of coal gas was in the air. Chantrelle was at the room's window, from which he quickly moved as if to keep attention away from the area. The doctor initially diagnosed Elizabeth with coal gas poisoning and moved her to a clinic, where she died in the afternoon without ever regaining consciousness.

The doctor then called on University of Edinburgh toxicologist Henry Littlejohn to investigate the case, who in turn enlisted the help of his colleague Joseph Bell, a pioneer of forensic science, and the inspiration for the character of Sherlock Holmes. Littlejohn and Bell suspected narcotic poisoning rather than an accident, which led to police getting involved in the case as a possible murder inquiry. After analysing vomit from a pillow and nightgown, Littlejohn and Bell detected opium, and an investigation showed Chantrelle had recently bought 30 doses of that substance. Bell further located a gas-fitter who had previously repaired a pipe outside the victim's bedroom window, and who attested to Chantrelle's keen interest in the workings of the pipe. Littlejohn and Bell concluded that Chantrelle poisoned his wife with opium and staged her room to resemble an accidental death from a burst gas pipe.

== Arrest, trial, and execution ==
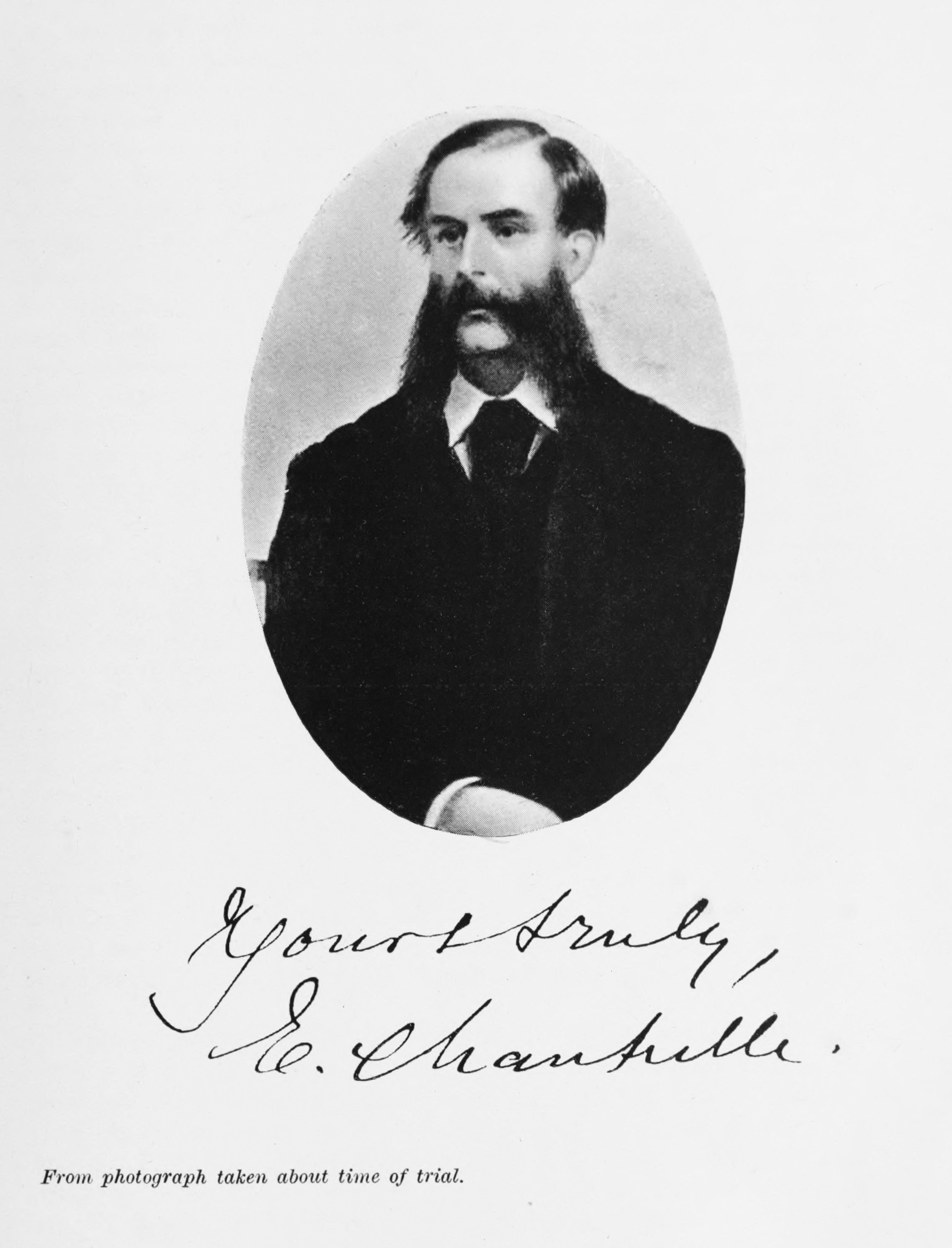
Eugène Chantrelle around the time of the trial in 1878

Chantrelle was arrested after Elizabeth's funeral at Grange Cemetery on 5 January 1878.

He pleaded not guilty to her murder. The trial opened on 7 May 1878, and lasted four days, after which a jury unanimously found him guilty of the murder. The judge sentenced him to death by hanging. Having not expected this outcome, Chantrelle gave a long, incoherent speech in which he claimed that Elizabeth had either taken the opium herself, or that someone had tried to frame him through the application of opium to her clothes. He was eventually taken away to Calton Prison.

Chantrelle was hanged in the grounds of Calton Prison on 31 May 1878. In one of his last statements, he said "Bye, bye, Littlejohn. Don't forget to give my compliments to Joe Bell. You both did a good job in bringing me to the scaffold." His body was buried on the prison grounds in an unmarked grave.

== Inspiration for Dr Jekyll and Mr Hyde ==
Author Robert Louis Stevenson's 1886 novella Strange Case of Dr Jekyll and Mr Hyde, in which a socially respectable character (Dr Jekyll) has a violent and monstrous alter ego (Mr Hyde), has been claimed to be inspired by several real instances of such 'double lives'. There is strong evidence that Stevenson was influenced by the Chantrelle case: Stevenson knew Eugène Chantrelle personally, having met him in Edinburgh at the house of a French teacher, and the pair spent a night drinking in a pub discussing a Molière translation. After the murder, Stevenson attended the trial in May 1878, including the conviction and sentencing. Much like the general public at the time, Stevenson was struck by the fact that Chantrelle had appeared to lead a normal life despite having a presumed murderous streak. In his memoirs, Stevenson wrote of Chantrelle: "He had left France because of murder; he had left England because of a murder; already, since he was in Edinburgh, more than one [...] had fallen victim to his little supper parties and his favourite dish of toasted cheese and opium".
