= Douglas Alston Gilchrist =

Douglas Alston Gilchrist FRSE FHAS (1860–1927) was a Scottish-born professor of agriculture; author and government advisor.

== Early life and education ==
The son of wealthy farmer William Gilchrist and his wife Margaret, Douglas Alston Gilchrist was born at Bothwell Park, Bothwell, South Lanarkshire, Scotland. He was the older brother of the suffragist Marion Gilchrist who, like himself, attended the famous Hamilton Academy school. Upon leaving the Academy, Gilchrist spent the next twelve years in practical farming before attending agriculture and science classes at the Glasgow (and West of Scotland) Technical College, after which he matriculated at the University of Edinburgh, graduating BSc in agriculture in 1889, and also gaining the Royal Agricultural Society of England's senior certificate and the Highland Agricultural Society of Scotland's diploma in agriculture, and its Fellowship (FHAS).

== Career and honours ==
Armorial Bearings, Armstrong College

In 1889 Gilchrist was appointed Director of the Agricultural Department, University College of North Wales, Bangor, leaving this position in 1894 to take up the professorship in agriculture at the old Reading College, a position he held until 1902 when he was appointed Professor in Agriculture and Rural Economy, Armstrong College, Durham University, a Chair he was to hold up to his death in 1927.

In February 1900 he was elected a Fellow of the Royal Society of Edinburgh. His proposers were Alexander Crum Brown, Andrew Peebles Aitken, Robert Wallace and Leonard Dobbin. However, he resigned from the Society in 1902.

In 1903 Gilchrist was awarded the degree of MSc in the University of Durham. Gilchrist was the author of numerous academic Papers and an advisor on agriculture to government.

== The Douglas Alston Gilchrist Scholarships ==
Douglas Gilchrist died at Newcastle upon Tyne, 4 April 1927, and under the terms his Will, in 1930 the Douglas Alston Gilchrist Scholarships (2 awards) were established, now administered by Newcastle University.

== Family ==
Gilchrist was married to Jessie Kathleen Ferguson.

His niece was the surgeon and historian Margaret Menzies Campbell.

== The Gilchrist Window ==
Douglas Gilchrist's sister, Marion, commissioned The Gilchrist Window (1936) by Douglas Strachan in the north transept of the Parish Church at Bothwell. The inscription below the window reads, "To the Glory of God. Erected by Marion Gilchrist in memory of her father William Gilchrist and her mother Margaret Williamson, her brothers, John William and Douglas, and her sister Agnes."

== Notes ==
Some sources cite Douglas Alston Gilchrist's birth year as 1859, others 1860. For the purposes of this article, 1860, the year stated in his obituary as a Fellow of the Royal Society of Edinburgh, is given as his birth year.

What was Armstrong College, Durham University, is now part of Newcastle University, which administers the Douglas Alston Gilchrist Scholarships in Agriculture.

The Glasgow and West of Scotland Technical College, became the Royal Technical College in 1912; the Royal College of Science and Technology in 1956, and in 1964, the University of Strathclyde.
