= Henry Littlejohn =

British surgeon and forensic scientist

Sir Henry Littlejohn MD LLD FRCSE
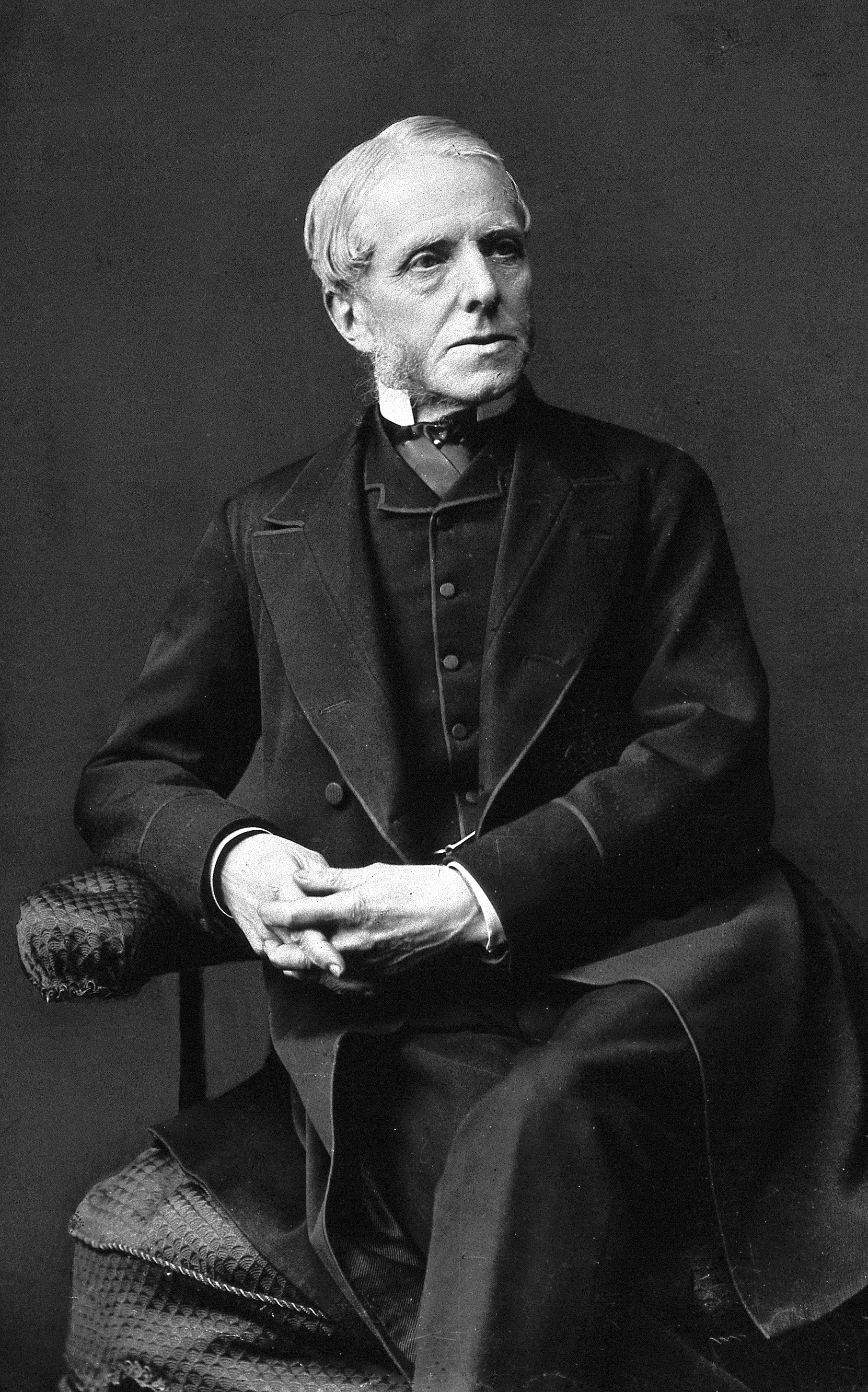
- Born: 8 May 1826; Edinburgh, Scotland
- Died: 30 September 1914 (aged 88); Arrochar, Dunbartonshire, Scotland
- Burial place: Dean Cemetery, Edinburgh
- Education: University of Edinburgh, Royal College of Surgeons of Edinburgh
- Years active: 46
- Known for: Advances in public health
- Relatives: Henry Harvey Littlejohn (son)
- Medical career
- Profession: Doctor
- Field: Public health, forensic science
- Notable works: Report on the sanitary condition of the City of Edinburgh (1865)

Sir Henry Duncan Littlejohn MD LLD FRCSE (8 May 1826 – 30 September 1914) was a Scottish surgeon, forensic scientist and public health official. He served for 46 years as Edinburgh's first Medical Officer of Health, during which time he brought about significant improvements in the living conditions and the health of the city's inhabitants. He also served as a police surgeon and medical adviser in Scottish criminal cases.

== Early life and education ==
Henry Littlejohn was born in Edinburgh on 8 May 1826 to Isabella Duncan and Thomas Littlejohn, a master baker of 33 Leith Street.

He studied at the Perth Academy before attending the Royal High School, Edinburgh (1838 to 1841). He went on to study medicine at the University of Edinburgh, graduating in 1847. He became a Licentiate of the Royal College of Surgeons of Edinburgh in the same year.

== Medical and teaching career ==
From 1847 to 1848, Littlejohn worked as a house surgeon at the Royal Infirmary of Edinburgh. After a short period of study in Paris, he returned to the Infirmary as an assistant pathologist. This was followed by a brief spell in general practice. He was admitted as a Fellow of the Royal College of Surgeons in 1854.

In 1856 he became a lecturer in medical jurisprudence at the Edinburgh Extramural School of Medicine at Surgeons' Hall, Edinburgh.

== Medical Officer of Health ==
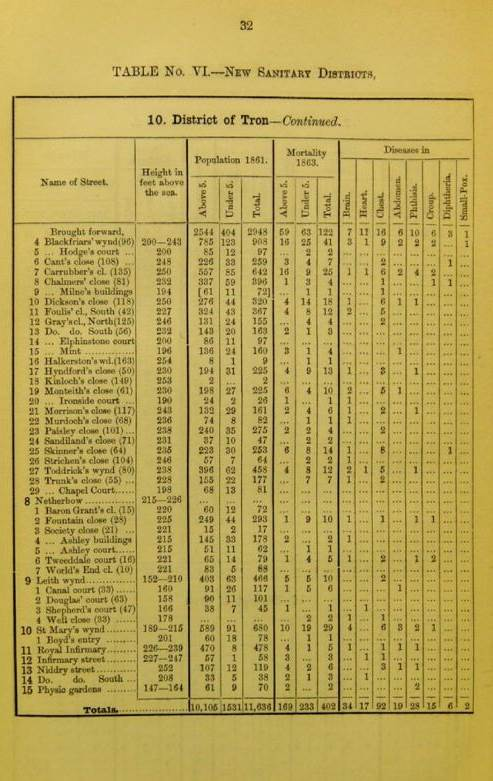
An extract from one of the tables in Littlejohn's 1865 report

In 1862, Littlejohn was appointed Edinburgh's first Medical Officer of Health. This was at a time when many of the town's inhabitants were living in squalor, in filthy overcrowded tenements, often with no water supply and with little or no sanitation. Disease was rampant. There had been two recent cholera epidemics, while typhoid, diphtheria and smallpox were endemic.

During his first three years in the post, Littlejohn carried out a meticulous investigation into the living conditions and the state of health of the town's inhabitants. His report, published in 1865, contained 120 pages of detailed statistics, analysing conditions in over one thousand separate streets, closes and tenements. It included extensive data on the prevalence of the most common diseases as well as historical data on earlier epidemics. The report convincingly demonstrated the link between deprivation, disease and mortality.

With the backing of Littlejohn's report, the Lord Provost, William Chambers, and the Town Council launched an ambitious programme of urban renewal in Edinburgh. This resulted in the demolition of the worst slums and created the largely Victorian Old Town that exists today. On Littlejohn's recommendation, the council also brought in regulations governing water supply, sewage, building standards, food hygiene, waste disposal and the management of cemeteries.

In order to track and anticipate the spread of infectious diseases through the population, Littlejohn campaigned for legal powers to compel medical practitioners to notify him of all cases of the most infectious diseases. Despite opposition from doctors, a clause was added to the 1879 Edinburgh Municipal Police Act making such notification compulsory – the first legislation of its kind in Britain. Significantly, the Act placed responsibility for notification on the attending doctor rather than the householder. This measure was extended to the whole of Scotland through the 1897 Public Health (Scotland) Act.

In 1900, Littlejohn identified a link between cigarette smoking and cancer, 62 years before the Royal College of Physicians produced a report which acknowledged such a link.

During Littlejohn's 46 years as Medical Officer of Health, the death rate in Edinburgh fell from 26 per thousand to 17 per thousand. There was a dramatic drop in outbreaks of smallpox and typhus. His introduction of compulsory notification of infectious diseases has been described as 'one of the major advances in public health of the 19th century'.

== Police surgeon and forensic scientist ==
Littlejohn enjoyed a parallel career in forensic science and criminal investigation. In 1854, the Town Council appointed him to the part-time post of police surgeon. He went on to serve as medical adviser to the Crown in Scottish criminal cases, in which role he would continue for over 50 years. He acted as expert witness in many criminal trials. These included three cases of child murder, the high-profile Ardlamont murder, and a case of culpable homicide resulting from a railway accident which claimed twenty lives. At the time of his retirement in 1908, the Scotsman noted that "there was no great criminal trial in the High Court in which he did not act as a Crown witness."

One of his most famous cases was that of the wife-murderer, Eugene Chantrelle. On the first day of 1878, Chantrelle's wife, Elizabeth, became violently ill, and died the next day. A broken gas pipe was discovered in her bedroom, and the police at first assumed that her death was the result of accidental gas poisoning. Littlejohn was not satisfied. Analysing some vomit found on her nightgown, he detected traces of opium. He ordered a full post mortem, which revealed that she had died of narcotic poisoning. Chantrelle was arrested, tried for murder, convicted and executed, mainly on Littlejohn's evidence.

== Appointments and honours ==
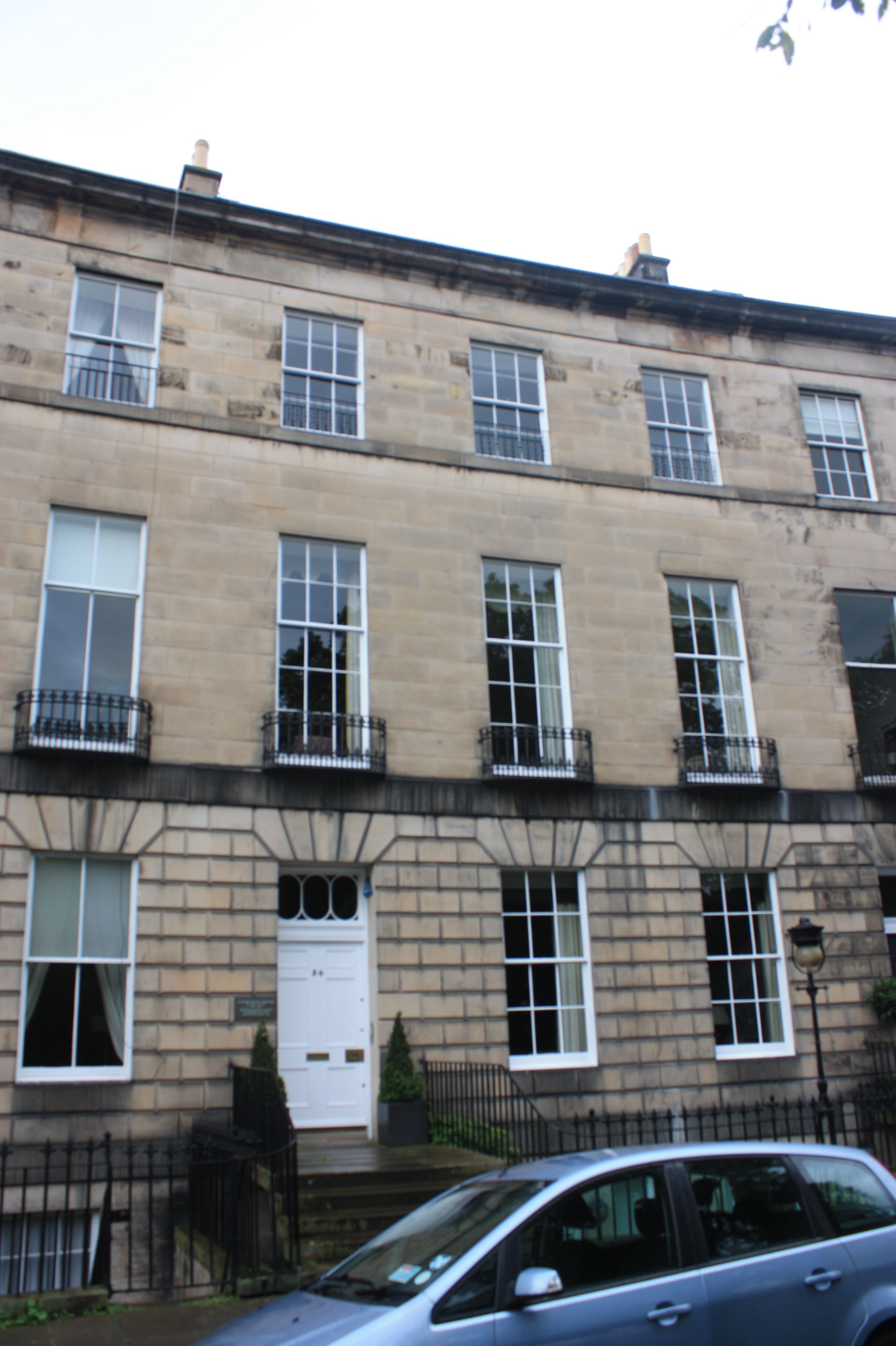
24 Royal Circus, Edinburgh

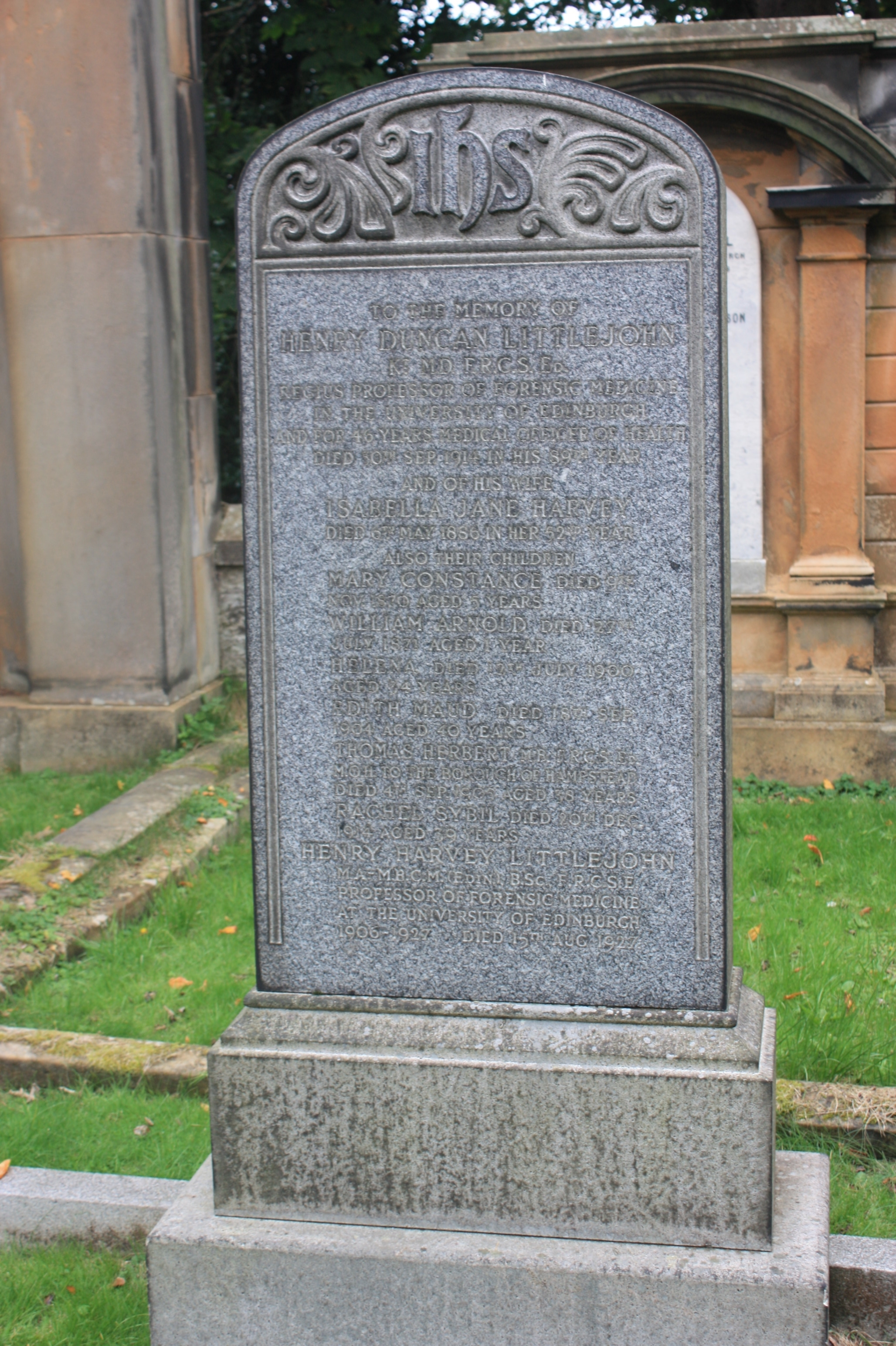
Littlejohn's grave at the Dean Cemetery

In 1855 Littlejohn was elected a member of the Harveian Society of Edinburgh and served as president in 1881. He was elected president of the Royal College of Surgeons of Edinburgh in 1875. From 1883 to 1885 he served as president of the Edinburgh Medico-Chirurgical Society. He received an honorary LLD from the University of Edinburgh in 1893. In the same year, he became president of the Royal Institute of Public Health.

He was knighted by Queen Victoria in 1895.

== Later life and family ==
In his later life, Littlejohn lived at 24 Royal Circus in Edinburgh's Second New Town. He retired from public office on 10 March 1908, at the age of 82.

His wife was Isabella Jane, daughter of H. Harvey. His son was Henry Harvey Littlejohn (1862–1927) (normally just called Harvey Littlejohn during his life but posthumously largely called Henry) who followed in his father's footsteps as a forensic scientist and medical officer, and who adopted similar techniques of investigation and problem solving.

Littlejohn died at his country house, Benreoch, near Arrochar, Dunbartonshire, on 30 September 1914. A strong proponent of cremation, he was cremated at the Glasgow Crematorium. His ashes were interred at the Dean Cemetery in Edinburgh. His grave is on the edge of the southern path towards the west end. He is buried with his wife, and their son and daughter.
