= Surgeons' Hall =

HQ of Royal College of Surgeons of Edinburgh

Surgeons' Hall Museum
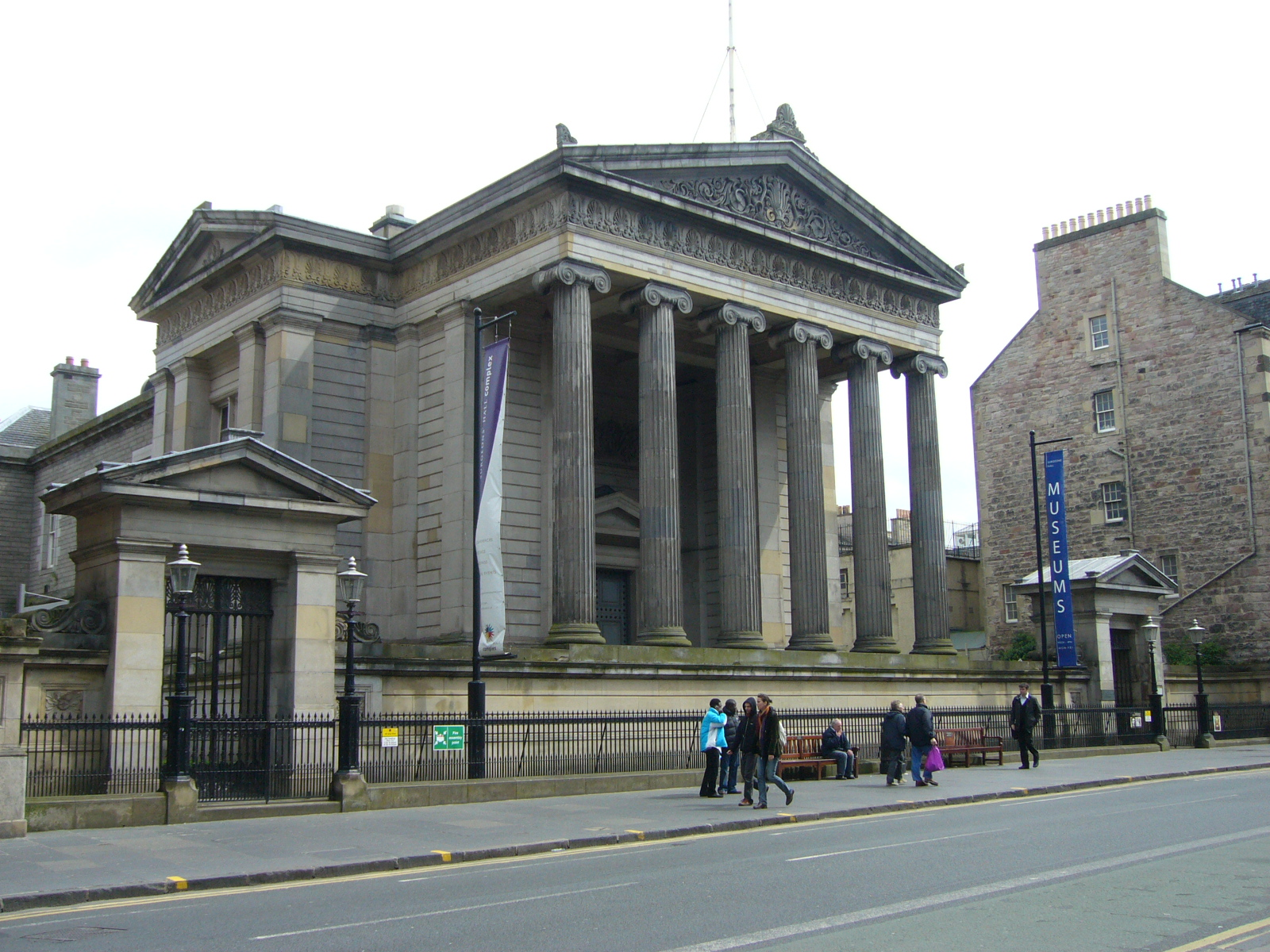
- Surgeons' Hall Museum

- Location within Edinburgh
- Established: 1697; 329 years ago
- Location: Nicolson Street, Edinburgh
- Coordinates: 55.9467°N 3.1853°W
- Director: Chanté St Clair Inglis
- Public transit access: Lothian Region buses 3,5,7,8,14,29, 30, 31,33,37, 47, 49 to Nicolson Street
- Website: www.museum.rcsed.ac.uk

Surgeons' Hall in Edinburgh, Scotland, is the headquarters of the Royal College of Surgeons of Edinburgh (RCSEd). It houses the Surgeons' Hall Museum, and the library and archive of the RCSEd. The present Surgeons' Hall was designed by William Henry Playfair and completed in 1832, and is a category A listed building.

Surgeons' Hall Museum is the major medical museum in Scotland, and one of Edinburgh's many tourist attractions. The museum is recognised as a collection of national significance by the Scottish Government.

The museum reopened in September 2015, after being closed for an eighteen-month period of redevelopment.

== History ==
=== Origins ===
The Royal College of Surgeons of Edinburgh was incorporated on 1 July 1505, when it received its Seal of Cause or charter and became styled as "The Incorporation of Surgeons and Barbers of Edinburgh". The barbers remained linked until 1722 with apothecaries joining from 1657. By charter of King George III in 1788 the incorporation had "Royal" added as a prefix.

The Museum at Surgeons' Hall, Edinburgh dates from 1699 when the incorporation announced that they were making a collection of ‘natural and artificial curiosities’. and advertised for these in the first edition of a local paper, the Edinburgh Gazette. Daniel Defoe, an early visitor in 1726, wrote in his A Tour thro' the Whole Island of Great Britain that the "chamber of rarities" contained many curious things too numerous for him to describe. Much of this early collection was given to the University of Edinburgh in the 1760s.

=== Nineteenth-century expansion ===
By the early years of the 19th century, the incorporation had received a Royal Charter to become the Royal College of Surgeons of Edinburgh. The college saw its primary role as the teaching of anatomy and surgery, the training of surgeons, and examination of their acquired knowledge. Anatomy and pathology specimens were crucial to that function. The museum expanded dramatically with the acquisition of two large collections. John Barclay, a successful anatomy demonstrator in the extramural school of medicine donated his collection, while Sir Charles Bell, Professor of Surgery in the University of London and latterly in the University of Edinburgh sold his collection to the museum. These collections were much too large to be housed in the original 1697 Surgeons' Hall, and so the surgeons commissioned the leading Edinburgh architect William Playfair to build the present day Surgeons' Hall, which opened in 1832. At first, the entire upper floor of the building was devoted to the museum collections, which were open to the public and attracted large visitor numbers. Throughout the 19th and early 20th century, the collection expanded as it became customary for surgeons and pathologists to donate not only specimens which they regarded as interesting or instructive, but surgical instruments and equipment. With the great scientific and technical advances of the time, the museum began to acquire anaesthetic equipment, histology slides, X-rays and photographs.

=== Twentieth-century developments ===
At the start of the 20th century, the College's need for a large meeting and ceremonial hall led to the conversion of about half of the museum space into what is now the main College hall. The 1907 minutes recorded the view that "it is essential to get rid of the Barclay collection which... has ceased to be of any value to the Fellows or to anyone visiting the museum." This was over-ruled and the retained Barclay collection was relocated to a new home, created by the conversion and incorporation of an adjoining tenement building.

Anatomical and pathological specimens in jars were seen as increasingly irrelevant as learning aids for trainee surgeons. The collections now began to focus on specialised areas, such as dentistry, histopathology, and radiology, whilst continuing the collection of surgical memorabilia – particularly instruments and equipment. In the 1950s much of the Barclay collection was given to other museums. For doctors the collections progressively became the realm of the researcher and the medical historian. While the museum had been open to the public since its earliest days, by the 1960s public access had become restricted to a few pre-booked tours.

==== Revival ====
In the latter decades of the 20th century the emphasis changed to make the collections more interesting to the lay public and more easily interpreted by them. In 1989 a grant from the Sir Jules Thorn Charitable Trust resulted in a permanent exhibition entitled 500 Years of Surgery in Scotland, which made use of a wide variety of media including models, paintings, photographs, film loops, book, journal and newspaper displays, and other memorabilia. This, together with a regular series of temporary exhibitions and constant improvement of the interpretation, resulted in a progressive increase in visitor numbers.

=== Upgrading 2014–2015 ===
In June 2014, the museum temporarily closed for a major upgrade. This was to provide lift access to the museum and improved and updated displays. These were the first radical alterations to the building since 1908. The museum reopened in September 2015 with this refurbishment allowing twice as many items to be exhibited. The work cost £4.2 million, with £2.7 m of this provided through a grant from the Heritage Lottery Fund.

==== 2015 expansion ====
In February 2015, the college revealed their plans for a £1.5 million expansion which would provide a new conference and events centre. The expansion was achieved by the college taking over an adjacent three-floor building on Hill Place, which had formerly been a languages school. this was opened in 2016 as the Prince Philip Building, named for the college's patron, Prince Philip, who became patron in 1955.

=== The museum buildings ===
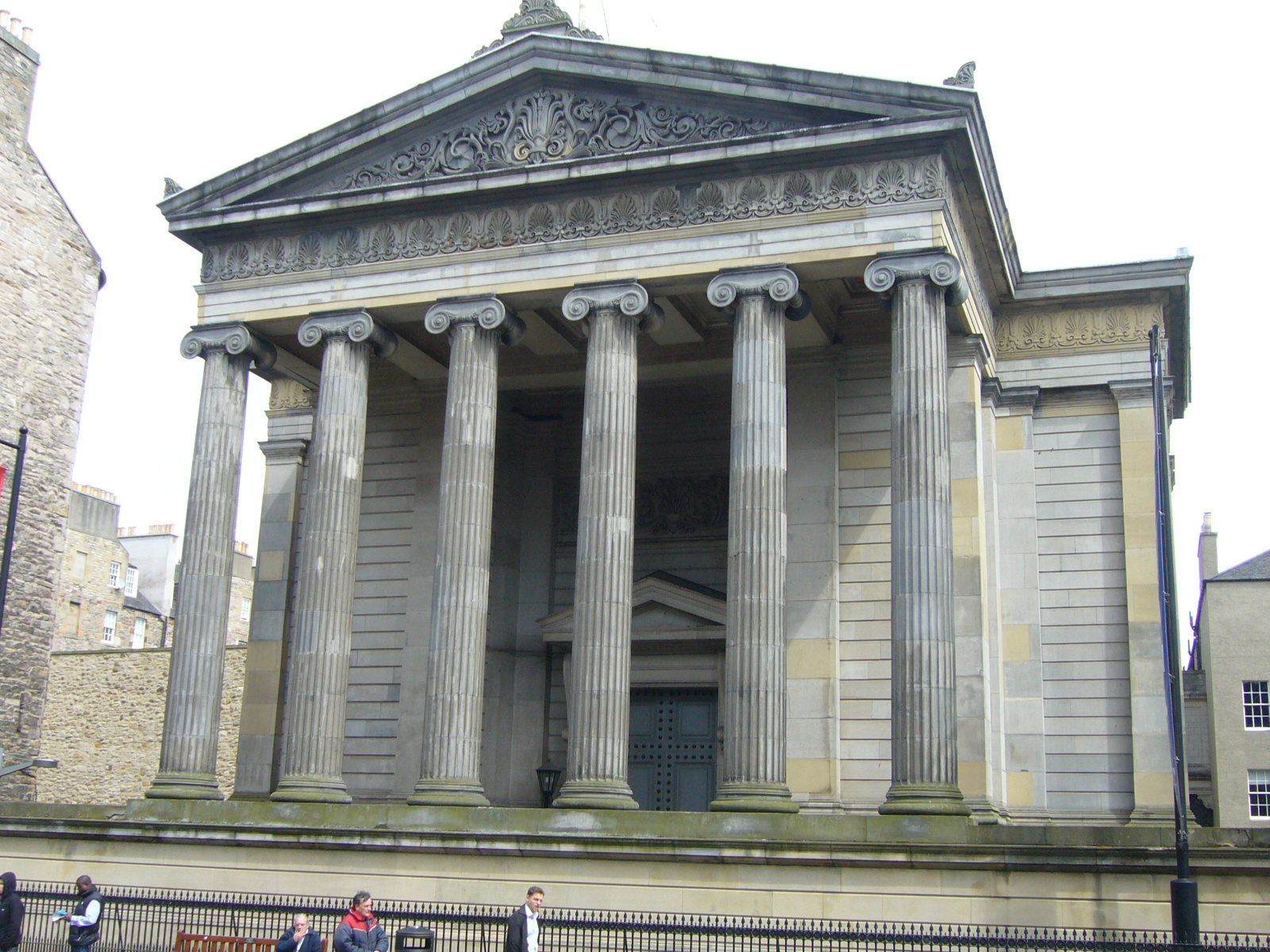

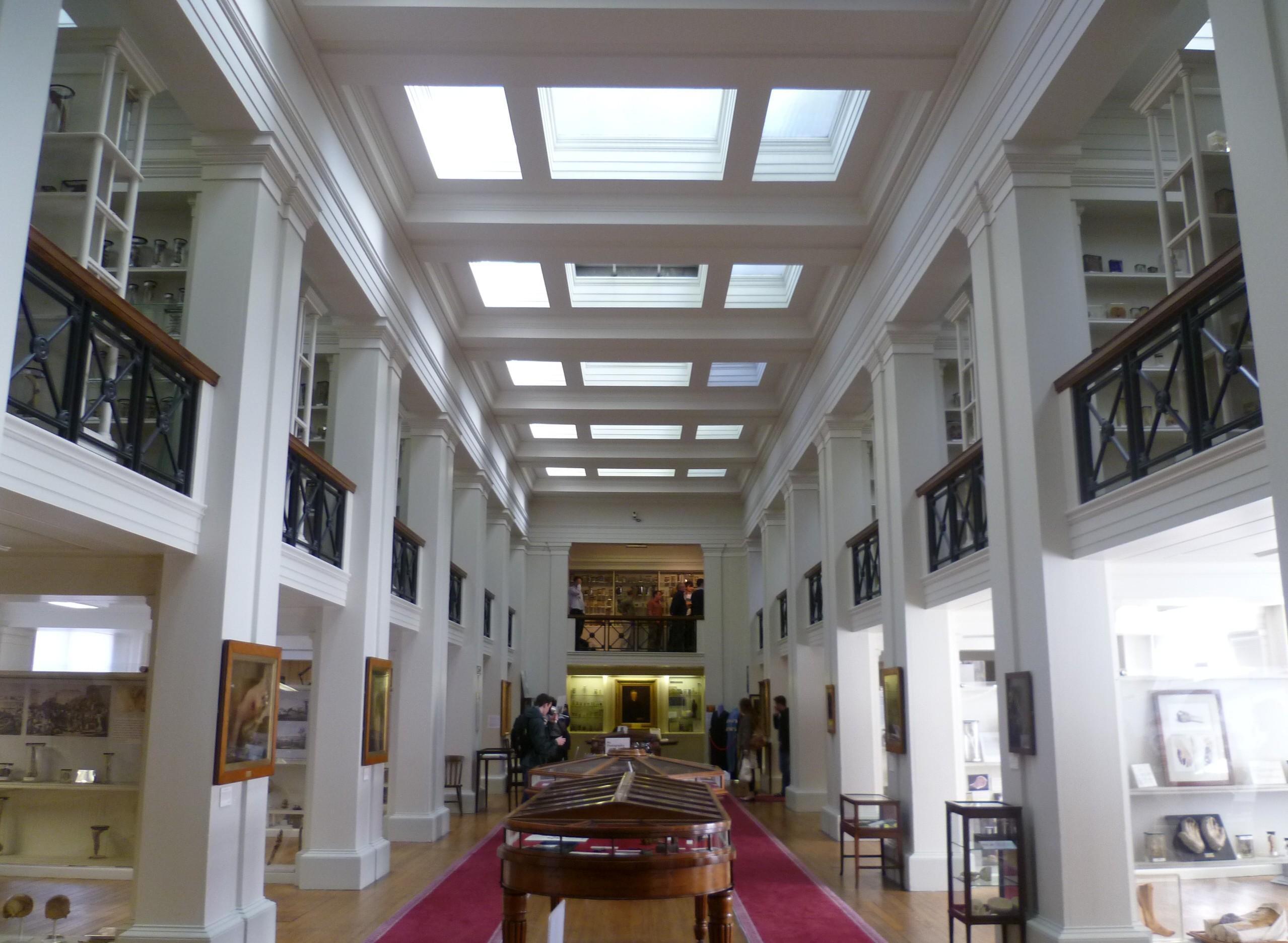

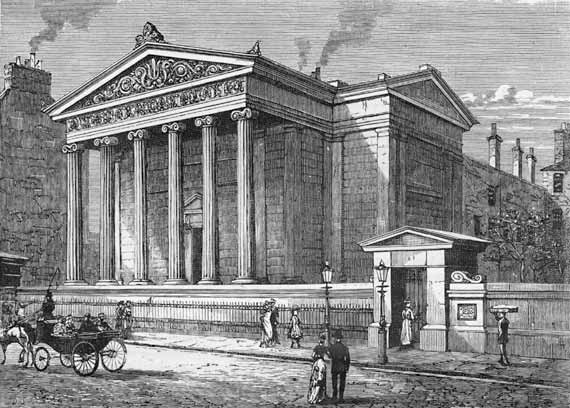
Surgeons' Hall

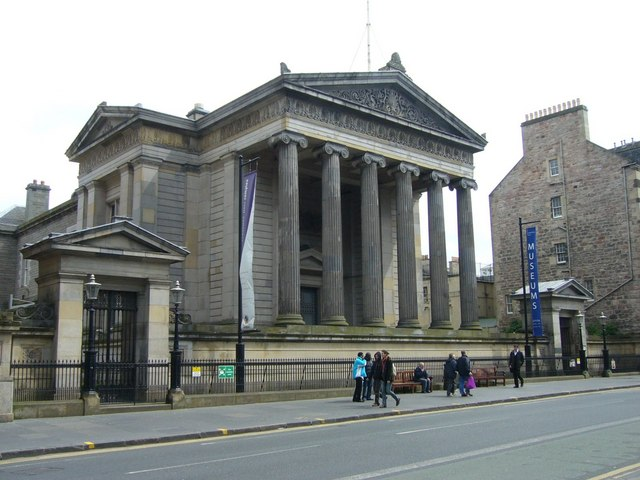

The collections originally occupied the entire upper floor of Playfair's Surgeons' Hall, which was built to house them. About half of this floorspace was converted into the College main Hall in 1905, but the original Playfair pathology museum next to it retained the Playfair design, decor and display cabinets. It is now named the Wohl Pathology Museum. The adjacent History of Surgery museum, the dental collection and the techniques and technologies display are in adjoining rooms which were originally part of the adjacent property at 9 Hill Square.

== Collections ==
=== The Charles Bell collection ===
Charles Bell was born in Edinburgh in 1774. He enrolled as a medical undergraduate at the university and also attended anatomy classes at the School of Anatomy run by his elder brother John Bell (1763–1820), whom he greatly admired and from whom he drew inspiration. He became a Fellow of the Royal College of Surgeons of Edinburgh, but both he and his brother were snubbed by the Scottish surgical establishment – neither was given a post in Edinburgh Royal Infirmary. His elder brother remained in Scotland and, in a tempestuous career, became the foremost Scottish surgeon of his day. Charles left for London, aged 30, in 1804. There he bought the Great Windmill Street Anatomy School where he established a reputation as a teacher of anatomy and surgery. He was appointed to the staff of the Middlesex Hospital and became professor of surgery. In London he amassed a museum of anatomical and pathology specimens which had grown to become one of the largest collections of its time. In 1825, he sold this collection to the Royal College of Surgeons of Edinburgh for £3000 (£2.4 million in 2009). The collection was packed under the supervision of Dr Robert Knox, museum conservator at the Edinburgh College, and shipped to Leith, the port for Edinburgh. It formed the heart of the Playfair Museum collection when the Playfair building opened in 1832, and much of it remains on display to this day.

=== Charles Bell’s corunna oil paintings ===
From an early age, Bell showed artistic talents that were developed by lessons from the foremost Scottish painter David Allan. Throughout his life, Bell put these skills to great use, personally illustrating his many textbooks. In 1809, he went to Portsmouth to help treat the casualties from the Battle of Corunna and there put his artistic abilities to great use. He produced a series of 15 oil paintings to illustrate the detail of the gunshots wounds suffered by the casualties. These paintings, on display in the museum, provide a valuable insight into the nature of early 19th-century gunshot wounds and their complications.

=== The Barclay collection ===
John Barclay (1758–1826) had established an anatomy school in his house in 10 Surgeons' Square, next to the College of Surgeons. This was a great success and established his reputation as one of the most renowned anatomy teachers in Europe. His collection of some 2,500 specimens was donated to the museum, but by the 1950s most of this had been donated to other collections, leaving only an elephant skull, three human skeletons and a few other specimens.

=== The Greig collection ===
This collection of some 250 skulls was donated to the museum by David Middleton Greig (1864–1936) who was conservator of the museum between 1920 and 1936. Greig, a surgeon in Dundee, was an international authority on bone disease and abnormalities of the skull and, during his working life, had amassed a collection of some 200 skulls which he donated to the college. The clinical details of each case was recorded and supplemented wherever possible by drawings and photographs.

=== The Menzies Campbell collection ===
John Menzies Campbell (1887–1974) was a Glasgow dentist and dental historian who amassed over his working lifetime a huge personal collection of specimens, instruments and paintings relating to the practice of dentistry. This was donated to the museum in 1964. The display includes a 19th century dentist's office, complete with 19th century instruments.

=== Casts and moulages ===
In the 19th and early 20th century wax and plaster casts or moulages showing abnormalities and diseases were widely used as teaching aids. The collection contains several of these casts, taken from tumours of the face and eye. There are casts showing foetal development and the anatomy and pathology of the intestine.

== Connections ==
=== The Burke and Hare connection ===
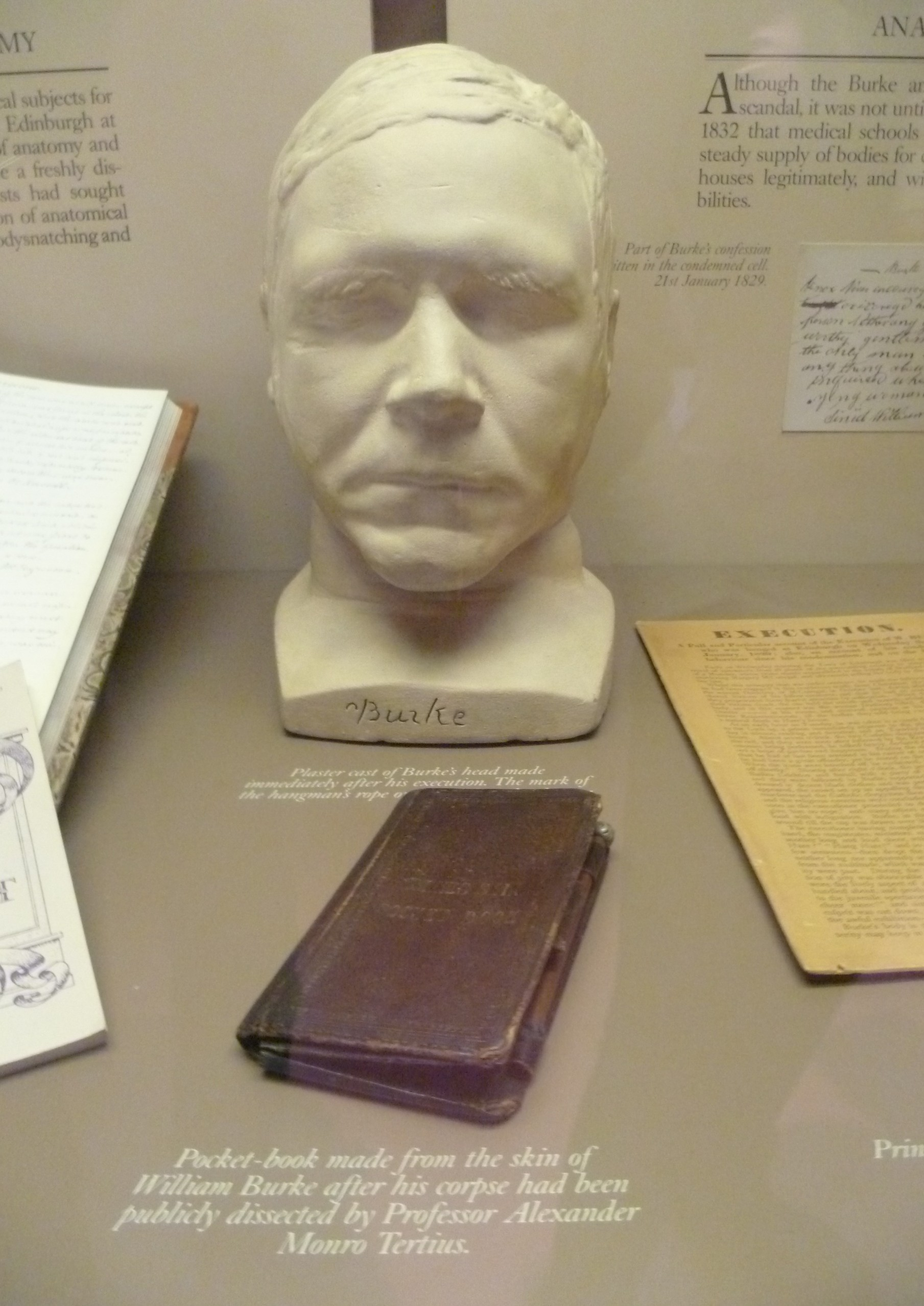
Burke's death mask and pocket book

Robert Knox, the conservator of the museum who organised and catalogued the Bell and Barclay collections, had established himself as a very successful teacher of anatomy in the extramural school in Surgeon Square. His anatomy classes were so popular that demand for bodies for anatomical dissection exceeded supply. Two Irishmen living in Edinburgh, William Burke and William Hare, resorted to murdering victims to supply Knox's anatomy school. Hare turned King's evidence and Burke was tried, found guilty of murder and hanged. His body was dissected by Alexander Monro tertius, the university professor of anatomy, and the museum has on display two items from that notorious episode – Burke's death mask and a pocket book made from his skin.

=== The Conan Doyle, Sherlock Holmes, and Joseph Bell connections ===
Joseph Bell (1837–1911) was an Edinburgh surgeon who was president of the Royal College of Surgeons of Edinburgh between 1887–89. He was a popular teacher noted for his diagnostic acumen, based on his powers of observation of meticulous detail, which were enhanced by his interest in the analysis of handwriting and of the origin of dialects. Among the medical students he taught was Arthur Conan Doyle, whom Bell selected as his clerk, or assistant. Doyle, gave up medicine to become a writer, and, having achieved fame and wealth through the Sherlock Holmes stories, wrote to his former chief "...it is most certainly to you that I owe Sherlock Holmes.”

=== The Edinburgh Seven connection ===
In November 1870, the Hall was the scene of a public riot when the first group of female medical students from the University of Edinburgh attempted to sit their anatomy exam. A crowd, which included male medical students attempted to prevent them from entering the building to sit the exam. These first seven women medical students endured a campaign of abuse throughout their studies but also garnered support from colleagues and politicians. Several of the Edinburgh Seven went on to found new hospitals and make significant contributions to improving the healthcare available to women around the world.

== Exhibitions ==
Subjects of recent exhibitions have included: breast cancer care, Charles Bell, chloroform, Joseph Lister, women's hospitals, and James Young Simpson.

== Education ==
The museum appointed its first full-time education officer in 2006 and since that time has provided regular educational tours and workshops for school students.

== Public engagement ==
In 2010, the museum appointed a public engagement officer who runs a full public programme throughout the year. The programme highlights different aspects of the museum and library collections, delving deeper into a greater number of topics and making the museum more accessible to a wider range of age and interest groups. Part of the public engagement development is done in collaboration with academic institutes, writers, artists, musicians and the museum's own volunteers who take lectures, talks, classes and workshops on an increasing variety of topics. The Public Engagement Outreach programme started in 2013.

== Research ==
Museum research involves identification and interpretation of individual objects. Recent research projects carried out in the museum have included studies on genetic markers for disease, facial reconstruction from skulls in the Greig collection, and diagnosis of skeletal disease using MRI scanning.

== The collections today ==
The museum collections are laid out as four permanent displays:

=== Wohl pathology museum ===
Located in the Playfair Hall, this consists of pathology specimens, surgical instruments, casts and paintings.

=== History of surgery museum ===
Surgeons' Hall, Edinburgh

On the ground floor a mock anatomy theatre is the venue for a short video which recounts the public dissection of David Myles in 1702. As each body part or system is described, these are demonstrated by projection onto a plastic model of the body lying on the dissecting table. The display cabinets trace the history of surgery, from the 16th century to the present day, with particular reference to Edinburgh's contribution.

=== Techniques and technologies and dental collection ===
Techniques and technologies displays surgical instruments and techniques from Roman times to the present day. The original Menzies Campbell collection has been expanded and includes dental instruments, artefacts, engravings and models as well as prints, paintings with dental themes

=== Body Voyager gallery ===
The Body Voyager gallery displays advances in robotic surgery. This is presented in three zones - the head, the torso and the limbs. The gallery also features interactive computer technology, where visitors can get the feel of a robotic surgery console. There are also displays of working surgical instruments, audio-visual presentations and photographs and paintings of robotic surgery.

Demonstrations, seminars and lectures take place in the "anatomy lab" and there is a gallery for temporary exhibitions.

Today the museum, like most similar organisations, no longer collects anatomical or pathological specimens or indeed any specimens of human tissue. The emphasis now is on explaining to the general public surgical disease, how it was treated over the centuries and how it is treated today. Aids to interpretation now include videos, hands-on surgical simulators and touch screen displays.

== Other uses ==
The Quincentenary Conference Centre, a modern annexe to the site, is used each August as a theatre venue at the Edinburgh Festival Fringe, when it is operated by the promotions company theSpaceUK and known as theSpace @ Surgeons' Hall. theSpaceUK also operate another building of the Royal College, the Symposium Hall, in nearby Hill Square.

== Bibliography ==
- Creswell, C. H. (1926). The Royal College of Surgeons of Edinburgh : historical notes from 1505 to 1905. Edinburgh, Privately printed for the College by Oliver and Boyd.
- Comrie, J. D. (1932). History of Scottish Medicine. London, The Wellcome Historical Medical Museum.
- Tansey, V., and Mekie, DEC (1982), The Museum of the Royal College of Surgeons of Edinburgh. Edinburgh. Royal College of Surgeons of Edinburgh
- Masson A. H. B. (1995), Portraits, paintings and busts in the Royal College of Surgeons of Edinburgh. Edinburgh. Royal College of Surgeons of Edinburgh
- Masson A. H. B. (2001), A College miscellany. Edinburgh. Royal College of Surgeons of Edinburgh
- Macintyre, IMC, MacLaren I . (2005). Surgeons' Lives : Royal College of Surgeons of Edinburgh : an anthology of College Fellows over 500 years. Edinburgh, Royal College of Surgeons of Edinburgh.ISBN 978-0950362090
- Patrizio, A., and D. Kemp (2006). Anatomy acts : how we come to know ourselves. Edinburgh, Birlinn.
- Kemp, D., S. Barnes, et al. (2009). Surgeons' Hall : a museum anthology. Edinburgh, Royal College of Surgeons.
- Dingwall, HM, Hamilton D, Macintyre IMC, McCrae M, Wright D. (2011), Scottish Medicine – An Illustrated History. Edinburgh. Birlinn. ISBN 978-1780270180
