= Margaret C. Campbell =

American marketing academic

Margaret Catherine Campbell is the Provost Professor of Marketing at the Leeds School of Business, University of Colorado Boulder. She served for a term as co-editor of the Journal of Consumer Research.

== Biography ==
Campbell has undergraduate degrees in psychology and economics from Stanford University, which she completed in 1985. She remained at Stanford for her PhD, which she received in 1992 from the Stanford Graduate School of Business. Her thesis was titled Perceived Manipulative Intent: a Potential Risk to Advertising, and was advised by Kevin Lane Keller.

At the end of her PhD, Campbell took a faculty position as an assistant professor of marketing at the UCLA Anderson School of Management. She moved to the University of Colorado in 2000, where she was promoted through the ranks, reaching full professor in 2012. She was given the provost professor distinction in 2017.

Campbell served a term as co-editor of the Journal of Consumer Research from 2018 through 2020. In 2017, she served a year-long term as president of the Association for Consumer Research.

== Research ==
Campbell's research concerns the reactions of consumers to actions of companies and brands.

Campbell's work on price fairness (building on earlier work of Kahneman, Knetsch, and Thaler) examines the circumstances under which consumers are likely to consider a price increase fair or unfair.

Campbell's work (joint with Amna Kirmani) on persuasion knowledge examines how consumers are likely to react to attempts at persuasion while shopping.

== Selected publications ==
- Campbell, Margaret C.; Kirmani, Amna (2000). "Consumers' Use of Persuasion Knowledge: The Effects of Accessibility and Cognitive Capacity on Perceptions of an Influence Agent". Journal of Consumer Research. 27 (1). Oxford University Press (OUP): 69–83. doi:10.1086/314309. ISSN 0093-5301.
- Campbell, Margaret C. (1999). "Perceptions of Price Unfairness: Antecedents and Consequences". Journal of Marketing Research. 36 (2). SAGE Publications: 187–199. doi:10.1177/002224379903600204. ISSN 0022-2437. S2CID 145538976.
