= FDSRCS England =

Fellowship in Dental Surgery of the Royal College of Surgeons of England (FDSRCS) is a dental postgraduate professional qualification. It is bestowed by the Faculty of Dental Surgery of the Royal College of Surgeons of England.

== Similar degrees ==
The Royal College of Surgeons in Ireland, The Royal College of Surgeons of Edinburgh and The Royal College of Physicians and Surgeons of Glasgow each has its equivalent Fellowship degree.

== Other degrees ==
The Faculty can also grant other qualifications as the Membership of the Faculty of Dental Surgery of the Royal College of Surgeons of England (MFDSRCS), Diploma in Dental Public Health, Diploma in Special Care Dentistry, Membership in Restorative Dentistry and the Membership in Surgical Dentistry.

== Current regulations ==
The FDSRCS was mostly granted after passing examinations. Currently, it can still be granted by the faculty after consideration of applicants' career and achievements; this is done through an election process by the faculty's council.

== See also ==
- Royal College of Surgeons of England
- Faculty of Dental Surgery
