= Marion Gilchrist (doctor) =

Scottish doctor and suffragette (1864–1952)

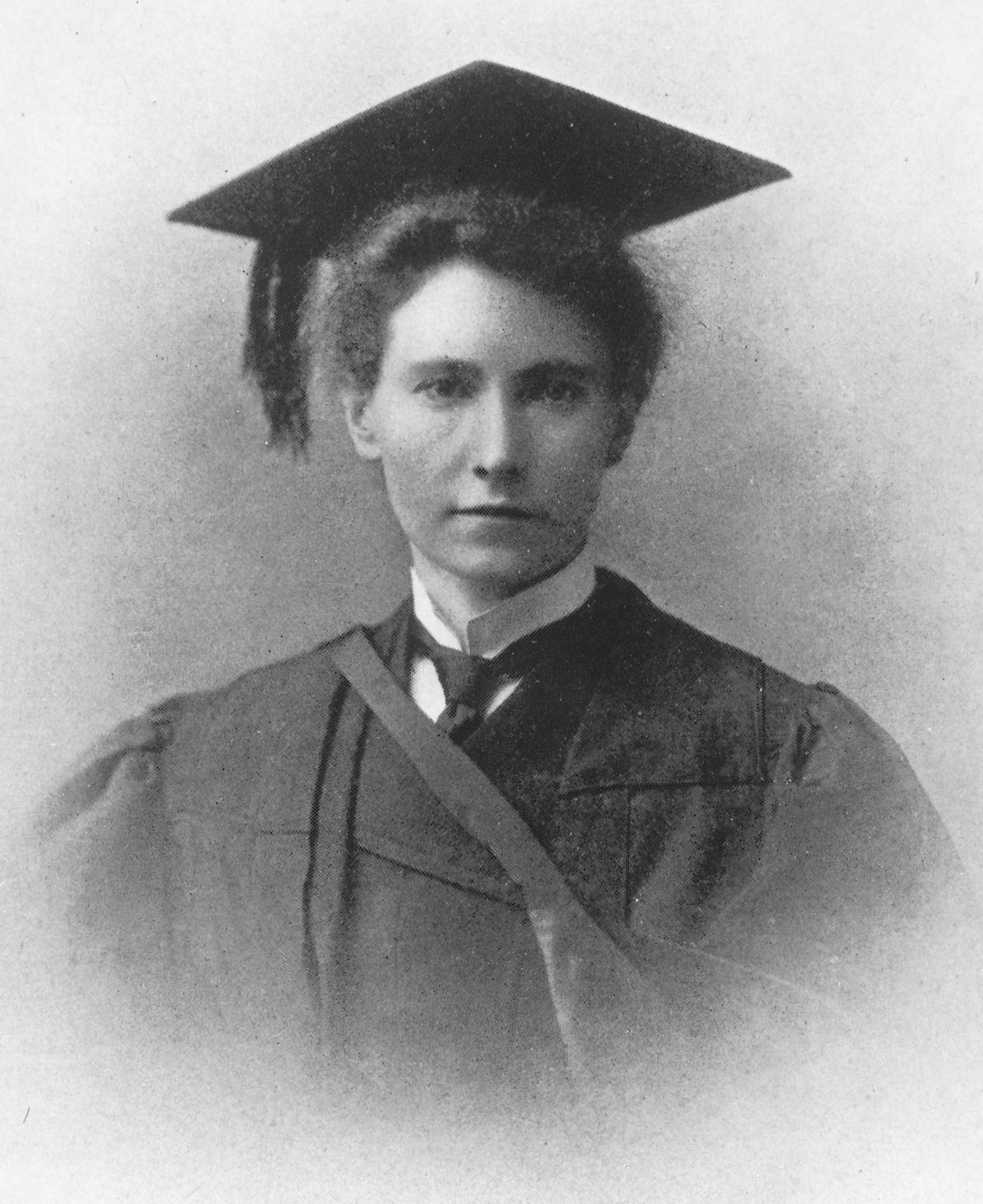
- Marion Gilchrist in 1894
- Born: 5 February 1864; Bothwell, Scotland
- Died: 7 September 1952 (aged 88); Glasgow, Scotland
- Education: Hamilton Academy; Queen Margaret College (Glasgow); University of Glasgow
- Occupations: Medical doctor, suffrage activist
- Known for: first female graduate of the University of Glasgow first woman to graduate with an MB and CH from a Scottish university Marion Gilchrist Prize
- Medical career
- Sub-specialties: general practice ophthalmology

Marion Gilchrist (5 February 1864 – 7 September 1952) was the first female graduate of the University of Glasgow, one of the first two women to qualify in medicine from a Scottish university; and a leading activist in the Women's suffrage Movement in Scotland. In recognition of her achievements she has been honoured in a number of ways.

== Early life and education ==
Gilchrist was born on 5 February 1864 at Bothwell Park farm, the youngest child of Margaret and William Gilchrist, a prosperous tenant farmer. She had four older siblings: three brothers, John, William and Douglas, and one sister, Agnes. Her brother was the Scottish agriculturalist Douglas Alston Gilchrist.

Her earlier education was at the local parish church when she was around seven years old. She met with some challenges in her education because her father and brother Douglas thought it pointless that she studied academic subjects. However, her brother John gave her encouragement and she attended Bothwell Primary School and Hamilton Academy.

In 1887, Gilchrist matriculated at Queen Margaret College, Glasgow, as an arts student and having begun the examinations while at Queen Margaret College, she attained LLA (Lady Literature in Arts), awarded by the University of St Andrews in 1890. In the same year, she enrolled at the new Queen Margaret College Medical School.

In July 1894, Gilchrist and Alice Robson became the first two women to graduate from the University of Glasgow, and the first women to qualify in medicine at a Scottish university. They graduated MB and CM.

While at university, Gilchrist was Vice-President of the Queen Margaret College Student Union, Vice-President of the Literary and Debating Society and Convener of the Queen Margaret College Committee of the Glasgow University Liberal Club. On 22 January 1894, she was elected President of the Women Students' Representative Council at its first meeting at Queen Margaret College.

== Career ==
=== Medical career ===
After graduation, Gilchrist entered general practice, and following the death of her father in 1903 set up her own practice at 5 Buckingham Terrace, Glasgow, remaining at that address for the rest of her life. Until 1928 she shared her home and consulting rooms with Dr Katherine Chapman (1883-1948). A graduate of Glasgow University, Chapman was a medical electrician at Glasgow Royal Infirmary and an expert radiologist. Like Gilchrist, she campaigned for women's suffrage in Glasgow before setting up a private practice in the West End of London in 1928. Gilchrist's niece, Margaret Menzies Campbell, also worked with her at Buckingham Terrace.

Specialising in ophthalmology, Gilchrist was appointed Assistant Surgeon for Diseases of the Eye at the Glasgow Victoria Infirmary, a post she held from 1914 to 1930.

In 1927, she was also appointed as an ophthalmic surgeon at Redlands Hospital for Women, Glasgow. Gilchrist gave her time on a voluntary basis as physician (1903–11) to Queen Margaret College Settlement's Invalid Children's School.

She was a leading member of the British Medical Association, and the first woman chair of its Glasgow division. She was also a trustee of the Muirhead Trust.

== Suffragette movement ==
Gilchrist was one of the founding members of the Glasgow and West of Scotland Association for Women's Suffrage (1902). She left the Association in 1907 to join the Women's Social and Political Union and the Women's Freedom League. Gilchrist examined Constance Lytton before her protest aiming to get arrested disguised as a working woman. In 1922, she was elected President of the Glasgow and West Scotland Association of the Medical Women's Federation.

== Death ==
Gilchrist died at her home on 7 September 1952. She never married.

== Further Information ==
Gilchrist gifted a stained glass window to St Bride's Church, Bothwell in memory of her parents, brothers and sisters. The window was designed by Dr Douglas Strachan and depicts the four elements and four seasons.

For International Women's Day in 2000, women members of the Students Representative Council of Glasgow University changed the name of the Sir William Pearce building to her name instead..

== Honours ==
Gilchrist's achievements were honoured when her home town of Bothwell named a public garden and a car park after her. The University of Glasgow named the Postgraduate Club after her. In 1932, a gift of £1,500 was used to endow a bed at Redlands Women’s hospital for the treatment of eye diseases which was also named in recognition of her.

The Gilchrist Window (1936) in the north transept of the Parish Church in her birthplace of Bothwell was created by Douglas Strachan from funds gifted by Gilchrist. The inscription below the window reads, "To the Glory of God. Erected by Marion Gilchrist in memory of her father William Gilchrist and her mother Margaret Williamson, her brothers, John William and Douglas, and her sister Agnes."

The Marion Gilchrist Prize was established in 1952 from Marion Gilchrist's bequest and is awarded annually by the University of Glasgow to "the most distinguished woman graduate in Medicine of the year."

In 2012, on the 60th anniversary of her death, Bothwell Library had an exhibition to honour her achievements.

The tour company "Gallus Pedals" has named a bicycle after her as one of ten Glasgow women "Trailblazers" in various categories. Gilchrist is in the category "Pioneers in Science and Medicine" along with Muriel Robertson and Dorothea Chalmers Smith.

== See also ==
- Grace Cadell
- Edinburgh Seven
