= Faculty of Dental Surgery =

The Faculty of Dental Surgery of the Royal College of Surgeons of England is an independent UK professional body committed to enabling dental specialists to provide patients with the highest possible standards of practice and care. The faculty is an integral part of the Royal College of Surgeons of England and is located at the college's headquarters in Lincoln's Inn Fields in London.

The faculty was established in 1957 to meet the requirement that the training of dental specialists involves the same academic discipline as that demanded for medicine and surgery. Subsequent to the 1946 NHS Act UK dental graduates were required to show evidence of several years' postgraduate training in all aspects of dentistry and to have acquired a recognised postgraduate qualification.

There are two other faculties of dental surgery in the UK: one based at the Royal College of Surgeons of Edinburgh and the other a part of the Royal College of Physicians and Surgeons of Glasgow. There is also a Faculty of Dentistry which is a part of the Royal College of Surgeons in Ireland. All four faculties work closely together on many professional issues.

== Faculty Dental Journal ==
Faculty Dental Journal
- Discipline: Dentistry
- Language: English
- Edited by: StJohn Crean

Publication details
- History: 2010–present
- Publisher: Royal College of Surgeons of England Faculty of Dental Surgery (England)
- Frequency: Quarterly

Standard abbreviations
- ISO 4: Fac. Dent. J.

Indexing
- ISSN: 2042-6852 (print); 2042-6860 (web)
- OCLC no.: 607975752

Links
- Journal homepage; Online access

The Faculty Dental Journal is a quarterly peer-reviewed medical journal of dentistry. It was established in 2010 and is published by the Faculty of Dental Surgery. The editor-in-chief is StJohn Crean (University of Central Lancashire).

The journal received the "best new journal" award from the Association of Learned and Professional Society Publishers in 2013.

== Postgraduate qualifications ==
The faculty can grant the following postgraduate qualifications to dentists:

- MJDF - Membership of the joint dental faculties at the Royal College of Surgeons of England (in conjunction with the college's Faculty of General Dental Practice)
- LDS - Licence in dental surgery, the oldest continuously existing dental qualification in the United Kingdom. Begun in 1860, under a charter by HM Queen Victoria in The 1858 Medical Act, it granted the Royal College of Surgeons the power to institute and hold examinations for the purpose of testing the fitness of persons to practise as dentists and to grant certificates of such fitness. It currently permits first registration on the General Dental Council's register to overseas-qualified dentists.
- DDPH - Diploma in dental public health
- DSCD - Diploma in special care dentistry
- MRD - Membership in restorative dentistry, a bi-collegiate specialist dental surgery examination run jointly by the Faculties of England and Glasgow
- IMOrth - Intercollegiate Membership in Orthodontics, a bi-collegiate specialist dental surgery examination run jointly by the Faculties of England and Glasgow
- MOralSurg - Membership in oral surgery, a tri-collegiate specialist dental surgery examination run jointly by the faculties of England, Edinburgh and Glasgow
- MSurgDent - Membership in surgical dentistry, a tri-collegiate specialist dental surgery examination run jointly by the faculties of England, Edinburgh and Glasgow (replaced by M Oral Surg)
- MPaedDent - Membership in paediatric dentistry, a tri-collegiate specialist dental surgery examination run jointly by the faculties of England, Edinburgh and Glasgow
- MSpecCareDent - a tri-collegiate specialist dental surgery examination run jointly by the faculties of England, Edinburgh and Glasgow

== See also ==
- Royal College of Surgeons of England
- FDSRCS England
- Royal College of Surgeons of Edinburgh
- Royal College of Physicians and Surgeons of Glasgow
- Royal College of Surgeons in Ireland
- Faculty of Dentistry of the Royal College of Surgeons in Ireland
- Faculty of General Dental Practice
