= List of University of Aberdeen people =

The University of Aberdeen has produced leading figures in the UK, Scottish, and foreign governments, including the Lord Chancellor George Gordon, former Counsellor of State William Barclay, the former Secretary of State for Scotland, Alistair Carmichael, former Secretary of State for Scotland, George Mackenzie, former Chancellor of the Exchequer, Alistair Darling, the former Paymaster General, Tessa Jowell, the former Deputy Leader of the Scottish National Party, Angus Robertson, the former Leader of the Scottish Labour Party, Kezia Dugdale, the former Deputy Leader of the Scottish Conservative Party, Murdo Fraser, the former Leader of the Scottish Liberal Democrats, Nicol Stephen, the former leader of the Scottish Green Party, Robin Harper, John Rose, former Finance Minister and Solicitor General of Canada, Sylvester Douglas, former Chief Secretary for Ireland, and Cosmo Gordon, politician and co-founder of the Royal Society of Edinburgh.

Aberdeen has also produced numerous politicians, Lords, MPs, MSPs, and cabinet members. The former Chief Constable of Police Scotland and Deputy Commissioner of the Metropolitan Police, Steve House, and the former Chief Constable of Police Scotland, Iain Livingstone. Additionally, businessmen such as Stephen Carter, founding CEO of Ofcom and Minister for Communications, Technology and Broadcasting under Gordon Brown, David Reid, former chairman of Tesco, Sir Thomas Sutherland, the founder of Hongkong and Shanghai Banking Corporation (HSBC), and Will Whitehorn, former president of Virgin Galactic, and Donald Cruickshank, former chairman of the London Stock Exchange.

Prominent alumni in law include former Lord President Duncan Forbes, Lord Advocate George Mackenzie, Lady Dorrian, the current Lord Justice Clerk in the Court of Session, William Grant, former Master of the Rolls, Frank Mulholland, former Lord Advocate and Solicitor General, Andrew Skene, former Solicitor General and co-founder of the Bannatyne Club, Priyantha Jayawardena, current Judge of the Supreme Court of Sri Lanka, Bertha Wilson, the first female Pusine Justice of the Supreme Court of Canada, Cosmo Innes, former Principal Clerk of the Session and historian, Bruce Allan Clark, prominent Canadian lawyer and First Nations activist, James Stephen, abolitionist lawyer who drafted the Slave Trade Act 1807 for William Wilberforce, and Alexander Asher, Dean of the Faculty of Advocates. Aberdeen has also produced numerous Senators of the College of Justice: Alastair Campbell, Alexander Seton, Francis Grant, James Ferguson, Morag Wise, Lord Woolman, and Lord Sandison.

Aberdeen is well known in historical, philosophical and theological circles, and it was an important centre in the Scottish Reformation and the Scottish Enlightenment. John Erskine, a religious reformer who ranks only after John Knox in importance of those who made the Scottish Reformation happen, John Lesley, Roman Catholic Bishop of Ross, historian, and counsellor to Mary, Queen of Scots, and Florentus Volusensus, a Renaissance humanist. The six Aberdeen Doctors, under the tutelage of Patrick Forbes, who opposed the National Covenant of 1638 and whose opposition was important in instigating the First Bishops' War. Thomas Reid, the founder of the Scottish common sense realism, Thomas Blackwell, John Gregory, James Beattie, James Macpherson, George Campbell, and Alexander Gerard, were all significant figures in the Scottish Enlightenment.

Aberdeen has produced three Historiographer Royal: John Hill Burton, David Masson, and Robert Rait. Gilbert Burnet, Bishop of Salisbury, philosopher, adviser to William and Mary and noted historian of the Scottish Reformation and English Civil War, James Mackintosh, Whig politician, philosopher, and historian of the French Revolution and the Glorious Revolution, Joseph Robertson and John Stuart, historians and founders of the Spalding Club, and James Burnett, a pioneer anthropologist and founder of modern comparative historical linguistics and a precursive figure in the modern theory of evolution. William Smith, the first Provost of the University of Pennsylvania, James Blair, founder of The College of William and Mary, and William Small, co-founder of the Lunar Society and teacher of Thomas Jefferson. Other academics who were ungraduates at Aberdeen include William Geddes, Sue Black, President of the Royal Anthropological Institute, Michael Lynch, George Croom Robertson, Robert Adamson, William Robinson Clark, Andrew Ross, Colin Campbell, Oliver D. Crisp, James Legge, and Arthur Thomson. James Gregory, Duncan Liddel, Henry Farquharson, George Chrystal, and Leetsch C. Hsu, were noted mathematicians.

Prominent alumni of the medical faculty include Patrick Manson, who first proposed malaria was transmitted by mosquito, and was the founder of the tropical medicine field, the London School of Hygiene & Tropical Medicine, and the Dairy Farm in 1886. Robert Brown, botanist and discoverer of Brownian motion, William Watson Cheyne, pioneer in the use of antiseptic surgical methods under Joseph Lister, Neil Arnott, inventor of the waterbed and one of the founders of University College London, Kai Ho, politician, co-founder of the University of Hong Kong and teacher of Sun Yat-sen, Peter Shepherd, who introduced the concept of teaching first aid to civilians, James Cantlie, pioneer in the use of first aid, William Wilson Jameson, Chief Medical Officer (1942–44) and an important figure in the development of the National Health Service, Graeme Catto, former President of the General Medical Council, Alexander Ogston, discoverer of Staphylococcus aureus, Alexander Stuart, Alexander Mowat, pioneer of paediatric hepatology, John Mudge, Robert Daniel Lawrence, founder of the British Diabetic Association, Joseph Adams, founder of medical genetics, and Arthur Keith, discoverer of the sinoatrial node. The first full-body MRI scanner was also invented in Aberdeen. Nora Wattie OBE, pioneer for women and children's health care in Glasgow slums.

Alumni in literature and journalism include Alexander Ross, Chaplain-in-Ordinary to Charles I and the first to translate the Quran into English, Thomas Urqhuart, the first to translate Rabelais into English, writer and poet Tobias Smollett, Ali Smith, the author of the Booker Prize nominated novel Hotel World and the Whitbread Award winning novel The Accidental, George Coleman the Younger, James Fordyce, Rosemary Ashton, Quain Professor of English Language and Literature at UCL, Simon Farquhar, Adam Roberts, and Archibald Forbes. George Chalmers, historian, antiquarian, occasional economist, and writer and serial biographer who courted controversy when paid by the Pitt ministry to publish a hostile biography on Thomas Paine, read for an MA at King's. George MacDonald, a pioneering figure in the field of fantasy literature and a mentor of fellow writer Lewis Carroll, read for an MA between 1840 and 1845. James Murdoch, journalist and linguist, wrote the first comprehensive history of Japan in the English language. Alexander Kennedy Isbister, Metis lawyer, journalist and educator, Nan Shepherd, the Modernist writer and poet, and Eric Linklater, poet, author, and military historian, who both played key roles in the Scottish Renaissance.

Aberdeen has produced radio, music and television personalities including Iain Glen, Nicky Campbell, Laura Main, James Fleet, Emun Elliott, James Naughtie, Sandy Gall, Iain Cuthbertson, Momus, Glen Oglaza, Rebstar, Rhod Sharp, and Derek Rae. Filmmaker Joseph A Adesunloye was also a student. Fiona Harvey, who has been described in media coverage as an alleged real-life inspiration for a character in the Netflix series Baby Reindeer, studied law at the university in the 1980s.

Those known in architectural circles include William Thornton, the designer of the United States Capitol, Charles Mitchell who worked with John Dobson and commissioned the elegant art nouveau church of St George's Jesmond from Thomas Ralph Spence; and Alexander Marshall MacKenzie, who designed Australia House and the Waldorf Hilton. Most significantly, James Gibbs, one of Britain's most influential architects and designer of the Radcliffe Camera at Oxford University and Senate House at Cambridge University, matriculated at the university.

Other figures include the inventor of percussion ignition, Alexander John Forsyth; Robert Gordon, the founder of Robert Gordon's College and Robert Gordon University; Brigadier General in the US Continental Army and close friend to George Washington, Hugh Mercer; the soldier and Frederick the Great's Generalfeldmarschall of the Prussian Royal Army James Keith; botanists C. H. Gimingham and M. R. Henderson; dermatologist Sir James Galloway; plant pathologist Lawrence Ogilvie; founding Classics professor of the University of Queensland John Lundie Michie; James Forbes, founder of the Scotch College; William MacGregor, Lieutenant-Governor of British New Guinea, Governor of Newfoundland and Governor of Queensland, and first Chancellor of the University of Queensland; ornithologist James Macdonald; mountaineers Tom Patey and Andy Nisbet; Colonial Secretary of Hong Kong Frederick Stewart; sports broadcaster Tyrone Smith of STV News; sports broadcaster and international rugby player Ian Robertson; Taliban kidnap victim Linda Norgrove; comedian James Veitch; and the first Foreign Minister of the Republic of Kosovo, Skënder Hyseni in 1986.

Princess Royal Anne, Richard Dawkins, David Attenborough, Isaac Watts, Denis Law, J. K. Rowling, Thomas Hardy, Justin Welby, Andrew Carnegie, Edward Elgar, Henri Becquerel, and Tony Robinson, have been awarded honorary degrees from the university. Prizes awarded to alumni include the Lumsden and Sachs Fellowship.

== Nobel Prize winners ==
- John Macleod, jointly with Frederick Banting, for the research which led to the development of insulin as a treatment for diabetes (1923)
- John Boyd Orr, Director of the Rowett Institute and Professor of Agriculture from 1942 to 1945, in recognition of his contribution to the worldwide fight against hunger (1949)
- Frederick Soddy, Professor of Chemistry at the University of Aberdeen from 1914 to 1919, for his work on radioactivity and isotopes (1921)
- Richard Laurence Millington Synge, biochemist with the Rowett Institute from 1948 to 1967, for the invention of partition chromatography, a technique used in the separation mixtures of similar chemicals that revolutionised analytical chemistry (1952)
- George Paget Thomson, Professor of Natural Philosophy (Physics) at Aberdeen from 1922 to 1930, together with the American physicist Clinton Davisson "for their (independent) experimental discovery of the diffraction of electrons by crystals" (1937)

== Academics ==
=== Anthropology ===
- Sue Black
- Tim Ingold
- Arthur Keith
- Lord Monboddo

=== Biology ===
- George Dickie
- Anne Glover
- Sevvandi Jayakody
- Hans Kosterlitz
- Hugh Pennington
- Neil Gow

=== Chemistry ===
- Frederick Soddy
- Anthony R. West

=== Classics ===
- John Stuart Blackie
- Barbara Craig
- William Geddes
- D. E. L. Haynes
- Peter Noble
- William Mitchell Ramsay
- Alexander Souter
- Jane Stevenson

=== Divinity ===
- Robin Barbour
- John Behr
- Helen Bond
- Ian Bradley
- Brian Brock
- Ruth Edwards
- Tom Greggs
- Iain Torrance

=== Economics ===
- Robert Hamilton

=== Engineering and physical sciences ===
- George Dunnet
- James Cossar Ewart
- Alister Clavering Hardy
- Lancelot Thomas Hogben
- William MacGillivray
- Henry Alleyne Nicholson
- James Nicol
- Paul Racey
- James Ritchie
- Arthur Thomson
- V. C. Wynne-Edwards

=== English, literature, and poetry ===
- Faridah Àbíké-Íyímídé
- Simon Farquhar
- Shihab Ghanem
- H. J. C. Grierson
- Momus, born Nick Currie, musician and writer
- George Rousseau
- Andrew Rutherford

=== Geology ===
- David J Batten
- Peter Clift

=== History and history of art ===
- Theo Barker
- J B Black
- Steve Boardman
- Hector Boece
- Roy Bridges
- Stefan Brink
- Paul Dukes
- David Dumville
- Karin Friedrich
- Robert I Frost
- Alastair J Macdonald
- Thomas Weber

=== Law ===
- William Elphinstone
- Neil Kennedy
- Thomas Smith
- Peter Stein

=== Mathematics and astronomy ===
- Patrick Copland
- Colin Maclaurin
- Alan Rendall

=== Medicine and physiology ===
- Dugald Baird
- Enitan Carrol
- Professor Stanley Davidson
- Alexander Stuart Douglas
- David White Finlay
- Thomas Fraser
- James Learmonth
- John Macleod
- John Alexander MacWilliam
- John Marnoch
- Lloyd Matowe
- Hugh Mercer
- Alexander Ogston
- George Smith
- William Stirling
- Nathaniel Wallich
- Robert Henderson

=== Philosophy and logic ===
- Robert Adamson
- James Black Baillie
- James Beattie
- Hector Boece
- Christopher Fynsk
- L. Gordon Graham
- John Laird
- John Lee
- Donald M. MacKinnon
- William Ritchie Sorley
- Catherine Wilson

=== Physics ===
- William A. Edelstein
- Reginald Victor Jones (1946–1981)
- John Mallard
- James Clerk Maxwell (1856–1860)
- George Paget Thomson (1922–1930), Nobel Laureate, 1937

=== Psychology ===
- John Callender

=== Zoology ===
- Henry Alleyne Nicholson
- Imants Priede
- Charles Wyville Thomson
