= Regius Professor of Natural History =

Regius Professor of Natural History may refer to:

- Regius Professor of Natural History (Aberdeen), at the University of Aberdeen
- Regius Professor of Natural History (Glasgow), previous title of the Regius Professor of Zoology at the University of Glasgow
- Regius Professor of Natural History, precursor to the Regius Professor of Geology at the University of Edinburgh
