= John Marnoch =

Scottish surgeon

Sir John Marnoch KCVO DL
- Born: 23 May 1867
- Died: 2 February 1936 (aged 68)
- Occupation: Surgeon
- Known for: Operating on the future King George VI
- Military career
- Allegiance: United Kingdom
- Branch: British Army
- Service years: 1895–
- Rank: Brevet Colonel
- Conflicts: First World War

Sir John Marnoch KCVO DL (23 May 1867 – 2 February 1936) was a Scottish surgeon and British Army officer. He was Surgeon to the Royal Household in Scotland, Regius Professor of Surgery at the University of Aberdeen (1909 to 1932), and President of the Aberdeen Medico-Chirurgical Society (1909 to 1910).

== Early life and education ==
Marnoch was born on 23 May 1867 in Aberdeen, Scotland, the son of James Annand Marnoch, a postman from Kintore. He was educated at Aberdeen Grammar School, then an all-boys grammar school in Aberdeen. He studied at Kings and Marischal College Aberdeen (i.e. the University of Aberdeen), from which he graduated with an undergraduate Master of Arts (MA Hons) degree in 1888, and Bachelor of Medicine (MB) and Master of Surgery (CM) degrees with highest honours in 1891.

== Career ==
=== Early career ===
From 1891 to 1893, following graduation, he held training posts at the Aberdeen Royal Infirmary and the Royal Hospital for Sick Children, Edinburgh. He was appointed assistant surgeon at the Royal Infirmary in 1893, and promoted to surgeon in charge of wards in 1900.

Alongside his medical roles, Marnoch was made a lecturer in clinical surgery at the University of Aberdeen in 1900. On the retirement of Sir Alexander Ogston in 1909, he was appointed to Regius Professor of Surgery. He stepped down in June 1932, and was succeeded by James Learmonth as Regius Professor: Marnoch was then made emeritus professor.

Marnoch was commissioned as a surgeon-lieutenant in the 1st Aberdeen volunteer artillery in 1895. His military service continued when he was transferred in 1909 as an "a la suite" Officer to the 1st Scot. General. Hospital. Mobilised Lieut.-Col., Aug. 1914. M.O. i/c spec. mil. section (Surgery of reconstruction), 1st Scottish. General Hospital with rank of Brevet-Colonel; Inspector of Tetanus, Northern Area January 1915.

There is an annual Sir John Marnoch lecture in Aberdeen University medical school.

=== Operation on the Duke of York ===
Marnoch had been an army surgeon in the volunteer corps for many years and at the outbreak of war he was commissioned in the 1st Scottish General Hospital RAMC with the rank of lieutenant-colonel (latterly Brevet Colonel). Three weeks after the outbreak of war the Kings Surgeon in Scotland, Sir James Reid, received a call from the Palace asking him to go to Wick in northern Scotland. There he received Prince Albert (‘Bertie’, 1895–1952), second son of the King, and the future King George VI. Prince Albert, who was serving as a midshipman on HMS Collingwood, had suffered from abdominal problems from an early age but on this occasion appendicitis was diagnosed. Reid travelled with the prince to Aberdeen on the hospital ship Rohilla. Marnoch performed an appendectomy on Albert in the Northern Nursing Home, Albyn Place, Aberdeen on 29 August 1914. The prince made a good recovery. He later returned to serve on the ship and thereafter took part in the Battle of Jutland.

== Personal life ==
Marnoch was a keen amateur musician and through his friendship with Charles Sanford Terry, Burnett-Fletcher Professor of History and Archaeology at the University of Aberdeen, he received the bound final proof of the full score of Edward Elgar's Violin Concerto. Terry was a close friend of Elgar and had been gifted the proof for his help with the proofreading of the concerto.

== Honours ==
- Knighted KCVO - 1928 Birthday Honours
- Deputy Lieutenants of Aberdeen – 5 April 1930 Brevet Colonel Sir John Marnoch KCVO
