= Paul Dukes (historian) =

British historian (1934–2021)

- Born: 5 April 1934; Wallington, Surrey
- Died: 25 August 2021 (aged 87)
- Education: Peterhouse, Cambridge
- Occupation: Historian
- Years active: 1951-1999
- Employer: University of Aberdeen
- Known for: History of Russia, Europe and the World

Paul Dukes FRSE (5 April 1934 – 25 August 2021) was a historian at the University of Aberdeen, known for his work relating to Russia and Europe.

== Early life ==
Dukes was born in Wallington, Surrey, a suburb of London. He was an Exhibitioner at Peterhouse, Cambridge from 1951 to 1954, and then from 1954 to 1956, he was Teaching Fellow in American history at the University of Washington in Seattle, completing an MA thesis under the supervision of Max Savelle, Jonathan Boucher, Tory Parson, Teacher and Political Theorist.

He then returned to the UK to carry out his National Service from 1956 to 1958, studying the Russian Language at the Joint Services School for Linguists in Crail, Fife, Scotland. After demobilisation, he taught American History for the University of Maryland Overseas at US bases in Germany and France from 1958 to 1959 and then began work for a PhD at the School of Slavonic and East European Studies, University of London. He completed his doctoral dissertation, The Russian Nobility and the Legislative Commission of 1767 under Hugh Seton-Watson and John L. H. Keep in 1964.^{*}

== Academic career ==
In September 1964, John D. Hargreaves, Burnett-Fletcher Chair of History at the University of Aberdeen appointed him as Assistant. Dukes remained at Aberdeen except for visiting appointments at Auckland in 1974 and Cornell in 1988. Successive appointments at Aberdeen included a stint as Head of Department. Beginning in 1989, he was Director of the Centre for Soviet (later Russian) and East European Studies.

His first book, on Catherine the Great, based on his PhD dissertation, was published in 1967 (and reissued in 2008). Then, over subsequent years, he published books on Russian, European and World History.

In 1999, after 35 years at Aberdeen, he retired. He was honoured by a Festschrift and also by election as a Fellow of the Royal Society of Edinburgh – the Scottish Academy. He has continued to publish on relevant topics. A new interest in how the study of history should adapt itself to the imperatives of the Anthropocene era led to a book, with an approach stemming from the Scottish Enlightenment. This has encouraged him to produce an intermittent blog Pandisciplinarity, now discontinued. He has completed a history of the Urals, and a study of great men in the Second World War. He was invited to The People's Republic of China: Nankai University, Tianjin in 2005 and to Nankai University and Jilin University, Changchun in 2012.

== Bibliography ==
- Dukes, Paul (1967). Catherine the Great and the Russian nobility : a study based on the materials of the Legislative Commission of 1767. Cambridge: Cambridge University Press. Reprinted 2008.
- (Joint editor with R. C. Bridges, J. D. Hargreaves and William Scott) Nations and Empires: Documents on the History of Europe and on its Relations with the World since 1648, Macmillan, 1969.
- The Emergence of the Superpowers: A Short Comparative History of the USA and the USSR, Macmillan and Harper & Row, 1970 (Dutch translation,Amerika Rusland : vergelijkende geschiedenis 1974).
- A History of Russia: Medieval, Modern, Contemporary, Macmillan and McGraw Hill, 1974;. 2nd. ed., Macmillan and Duke UP, 1990; 3rd. ed., Macmillan and Duke UP, 1997. (Romanian translation, Istoria Rusiei, 2009)
- Russia under Catherine the Great, 2 vols., Oriental Research Partners, 1978-9.
- October and the World: Perspectives on the Russian Revolution, Macmillan, 1979.
- The Making of Russian Absolutism, 1613-1801, Longman History of Russia, Longman, 1982; 2nd ed., 1990.
- A History of Europe, 1648-1948: The Arrival, The Rise, the Fall, Macmillan, 1985.
- The Last Great Game, USA versus USSR: Events, Conjunctures, Structures, Pinter, 1989.
- (Joint Editor with John Dunkley) Culture and Revolution, Pinter, 1989.
- (Editor) Russia and Europe, Collins & Brown, 1991.
- (Joint Editor with Terry Brotherstone) The Trotsky Reappraisal, Edinburgh UP, 1992. (Japanese translation, トロツキー再評価 /Torotsukī saihyōka, 1994)
- (Editor) The Universities of Aberdeen and Europe: The First Three Centuries, Quincentennial Studies in the History of the University of Aberdeen, General Editor Jennifer Carter, Aberdeen UP, 1995.
- (Editor) Frontiers of European Culture, Edwin Mellen Press, 1996.
- World Order in History: Russia and the West, Routledge, 1995.
- The Superpowers: A Short History, Taylor and Francis, 2000. This is his most widely held book; According to WorldCat, the book is held in 1050 libraries
- Paths to a New Europe: From Pre-Modern to Post-Modern Times, Palgrave, 2004.
- The USA in the Making of the USSR: The Washington Conference, 1921-1922, and ‘Uninvited Russia’, Taylor and Francis, 2004.
- (Joint Author with Jarmo T. Kotilaine and Graeme P. Herd) Stuarts and Romanovs: The Rise and Fall of a Special Relationship, Dundee UP, 2009.
- Minutes to Midnight: History and the Anthropocene Era since 1763, Anthem, 2011.
- — (November 2013). "Big History, deep history and the Anthropocene". History Matters. History Today. 63 (11): 4–5.
- A History of the Urals: Russia's Crucible from the Early Empire to the Post-Soviet Era, Bloomsbury, 2015.
- — (January 2017). "The Problem with Counterfactualism". History Matters. History Today. 67 (1).
- Great Men in the Second World War: The Rise and Fall of the Big Three, Bloomsbury, 2017.
