= Elgin Academy, Moray =

Elgin Academy

Location
- Morriston Road; Elgin, Moray, IV30 4ND; Scotland; 57°39′09″N 3°19′41″W

Information
- Established: 1801; 225 years ago
- Local authority: Moray
- Staff: 73 (FTE)
- Enrolment: 1024 (2018)
- Houses: Gordon Innes Moray Randolph Seafield
- Colours: Navy Blue, Black and Red
- Website: www.elginacademy.co.uk

Elgin Academy is a secondary school in Elgin, Moray, Scotland. The school was ranked 181 out of 340 schools in Scotland by the Times with 37% of pupils attaining five Highers.

== Admissions ==
Pupils at Elgin Academy are in years S1 to S6. Most arrive in first year (S1) from one of the nearby primary schools, which include Bishopmill Primary, West End Primary, East End Primary, Seafield Primary and St Sylvesters. Other pupils arrive in later years, mainly because of the nearby Royal Air Force base at Lossiemouth.

== History ==
Elgin Academy is the biggest school in Moray, with a history going back to the Middle Ages. The first school was built on the adjacent corners of Academy Street and Francis Place, now the site of the local youth cafe. The second academy was built in 1801, on the site that is now Moray College.

The third Elgin Academy building, on Morriston Road, was built in the late 1960s and opened in 1969.

In 2006 plans to merge the academy with Elgin High School were rejected after a public consultation. Instead a new £30 million building was constructed under private finance initiative, and opened in 2012.

== List of headteachers ==
- Ian Andrew – 1922 to 1933 (later head of Robert Gordon's College from 1933 to 1943, and from 1943 to 1953 of George Watson's College)
- Harry Bell OBE – 1933 to 1936 (later rector of Dollar Academy from 1936 to 1960)
- Henry Humble – 1950 to 1964
- Alastair Glashan – 1964 to 1987
- Norman Strachan – from 1987 to 2001
- Alistair Brown – from 2001 to 2006
- Margaret Cowie – from 2007 to 2011
- David Barnett – from 2011 to January 2019 (moved to work at Cults Academy in Aberdeen in January 2019)
- Kyle Scott – from January 2019 – January 2024
- Natalie Munro – from February 2024 (Acting)
- Neil Johnson – from August 2024

== Notable former pupils ==
- Gregor Hayter, former professional rugby player, played for Caledonia Reds, Edinburgh Rugby and Glasgow Warriors as well as in Italy. Was educated at the academy in the late 1980s and early 1990s.
- Richard Foster, professional footballer played for Aberdeen, Rangers and Ross County was educated at the academy in the late 1990s.
- Prof Alexander Stuart Douglas, Regius Professor of Medicine at Aberdeen University was educated at the academy in the 1930s before graduating with a MBChB from Glasgow University in 1944.
