= James Ritchie (naturalist) =

Scottish naturalist and archaeologist

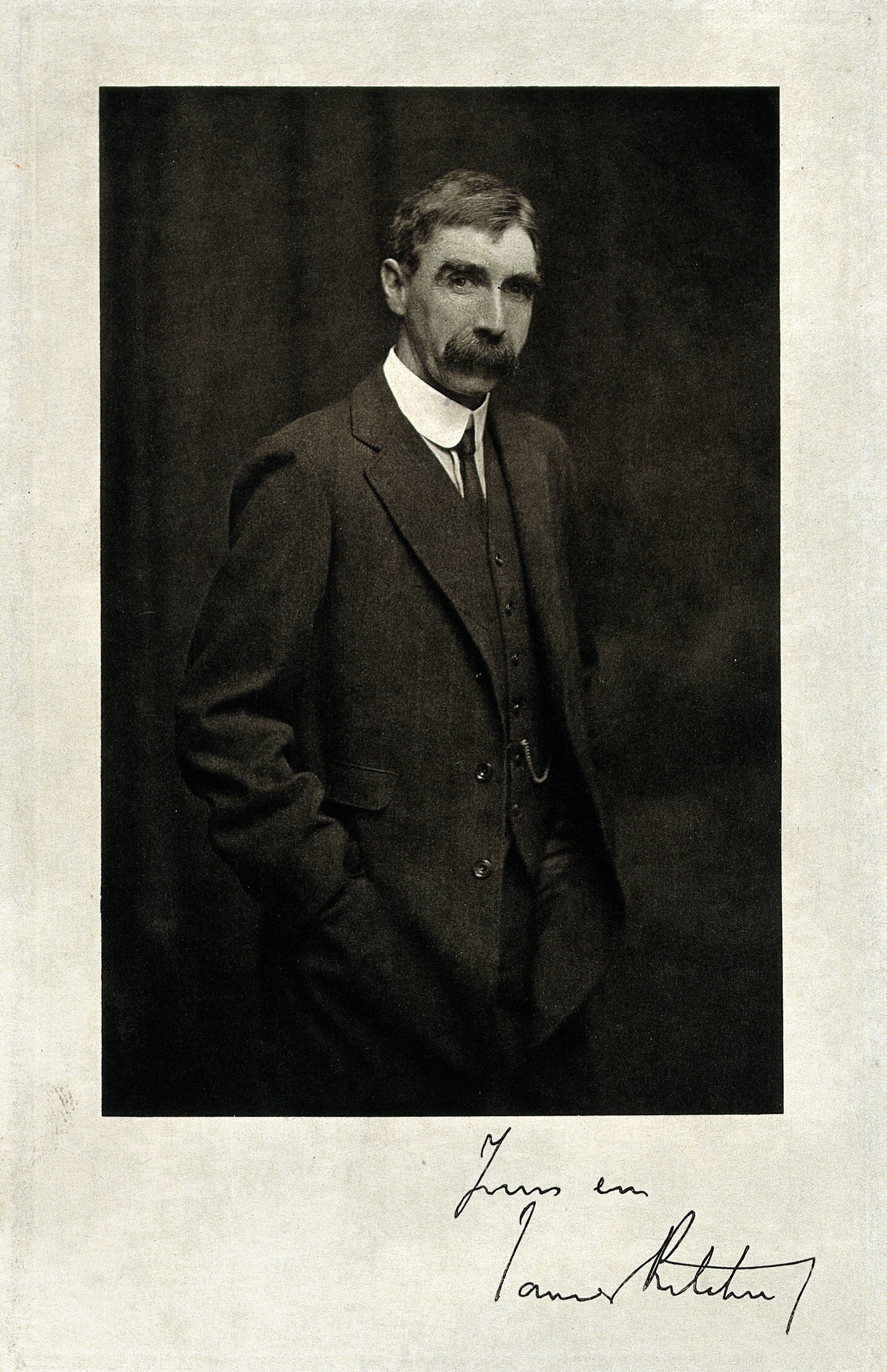
James Ritchie (date unknown)

James Ritchie CBE PRSE (27 May 1882 – 19 October 1958) was a Scottish naturalist and archaeologist, who was Professor of Natural History at the University of Edinburgh 1936–52 and President of the Royal Society of Edinburgh 1952–1958.

== Life ==
He was born on 27 May 1882 in Port Elphinstone in Aberdeenshire the son of James Ritchie, the local schoolmaster. He was educated at Gordon's College in Aberdeen then studied Science at Aberdeen University.

In 1916 he was elected a Fellow of the Royal Society of Edinburgh. His proposers were Sir Thomas Carlaw Martin, James Cossar Ewart, James Hartley Ashworth and Cargill Gilston Knott. He won the Society's Keith Prize for the period 1941–43. He served as Secretary 1928–31; Vice President 1931–34, 1940–43 and 1951–54; and President 1954–58.

From 1921 to 1930 he was Keeper of Natural History at the Royal Scottish Museum on Chambers Street in Edinburgh. In 1930 he left Edinburgh to take up a post of Regius Professor of Natural History at Aberdeen University but returned to Edinburgh in 1936 to take a professorship at Edinburgh University.

He retired in 1952 and died on 19 October 1958.

He left his collection of 266 hydroids to the Royal Scottish Museum.

== Family ==
He was married to Jessie Jane Elliot (d.1933). Their children included the physiologist Anthony Elliot Ritchie FRSE.

== Publications ==
- The Influence of Man on Animal Life in Scotland
- A Study of Faunal Evolution

== Artistic recognition ==
His painting, by Alfred Edward Borthwick, hangs at the Royal Society of Edinburgh.
