= Richard Lawrence Himsworth =

Sir Richard Lawrence Himsworth (14 June 1937 – 17 February 2020) was a British endocrinologist and public health administrator.

== Biography ==
Born in London, he was the second son of Sir Harold Himsworth. He was educated at Westminster School, and in 1956 entered Trinity College, Cambridge, later studying medicine at University College London.

Himsworth was appointed to a MRC fellowship at Columbia University in 1970. He was made Regius Professor of Medicine at the University of Aberdeen in 1985.

== Personal life ==
He married Sara Margaret Tattersall (born 1939) in 1966, whom he had two sons and a daughter.
