= Regius Professor of Surgery (Aberdeen) =

The Regius Professor of Surgery is a Regius professorship held at the University of Aberdeen. The position was created by Queen Victoria in 1839 and was originally a professorship at Marischal College, until it amalgamated with King's College in 1860 to become the modern University of Aberdeen.

== Holders ==
- 1839–1882: William Pirrie
- 1882–1909: Alexander Ogston
- 1910–1932: Sir John Marnoch
- 1932–1938: James Learmonth
- 1939–1962: William Wilson
- 1962–1982: George Smith
- 1982–1985: vacant
- 1985–1998: Oleg Eremin
- 1998–2000: vacant
- 2000–present: James Hutchison
