= Harold Percival Himsworth =

British medical scientist (1905–1993)

Sir Harold Percival "Harry" Himsworth, KCB, FRS (19 May 1905 – 1 November 1993) was a British scientist, best known for his medical research on diabetes mellitus.

== Early life ==
He was born in Huddersfield, West Yorkshire, the son of Joseph Arnold Himsworth and Amy Eliza Barraclough. He was educated at the local Spring Grove School and King James's Grammar School, Almondbury. He married Charlotte Gray in 1932: they had two sons. His second son, Richard Lawrence Himsworth (1937–2020), was an endocrinologist and public health administrator.

== Medical career ==
He studied medicine at the University of London and trained in University College Hospital (UCH). His early involvement in medical research (especially of diabetes and later of liver disease) would lead to an important 1936 paper in The Lancet, distinguishing the two main types of diabetes. He delivered the Goulstonian Lecture at the Royal College of Physicians in 1939 entitled Mechanism of diabetes mellitus

He was appointed Professor of Medicine at the University of London and the Secretary of the Medical Research Council (MRC) for the very long period of 1949-1968.

He was awarded a KCB in the New Year honours of 1952 and in 1953 was appointed Honorary Physician to the Queen. He was elected a fellow of the Royal Society in March, 1955, a member of the American Academy of Arts and Sciences in 1957, and the American Philosophical Society in 1972.

The Prime Minister of the day saw Sir Harold Himsworth's report about the 'committee considering the effects of ..... nuclear radiation' The Prime Minister's comment was "A pity, but we cannot help it". (dated 16 Nov 1955). From the office of AERE Directors Office.

His archives are being held by the Wellcome Library, London.

== Dieting ==
Himsworth recommended a high-carbohydrate diet to treat diabetes. Professor Edwin Gale has noted:

He demonstrated that injected insulin produced a greater hypoglycaemic response in individuals treated with the high carbohydrate diet, thus demonstrating that diet could influence insulin sensitivity. The high carbohydrate diet worked because it allowed the flow of glucose to the tissues to be maintained at a lower head of pressure by making people more sensitive to their own insulin.
