= James Duncan Matthews =

Scottish zoologist

- Born: 12 November 1851; Aberdeen, Scotland
- Died: 21 November 1890 (aged 39)
- Burial place: St Nicholas Churchyard, Aberdeen
- Education: Aberdeen University
- Occupation: zoologist
- Known for: involved in food fish research
- Parents: James Matthews (father); Elizabeth Duncan (mother)
- Awards: Fellow, Royal Society of Edinburgh

James Duncan Matthews FRSE (12 November 1851 – 21 November 1890) was a short-lived but influential Scottish zoologist who worked closely with James Cossar Ewart.

== Life ==
He was born 12 November 1851 at 16 Adelphi Court in Aberdeen the son of the future Lord Provost, James Matthews, an architect, and his wife, Elizabeth Duncan. He originally trained as an architect but in 1869 he suffered a severe attack of typhoid fever which greatly damaged his health. He then entered Aberdeen University studying Zoology under James Cossar Ewart who became a lifelong colleague and friend (Ewart was actually the younger of the pair). He travelled to both Australia and America for educational and health reasons.

He worked with George Brook at the Fishery Board of Scotland involved in food fish research.

In 1883 he was elected a Fellow of the Royal Society of Edinburgh. His proposers were William Turner, James Matthews Duncan, John Gray McKendrick and James Cossar Ewart.

He died on 21 November 1890. He is buried with his parents in St Nicholas Churchyard in Aberdeen.
