= J. B. Black =

Scottish historian

John Bennett Black FRHistS (1883–1964) was a Scottish historian whose primary topic of study was Elizabethan England. From 1930 to 1953 he was Burnett-Fletcher Professor of History at the University of Aberdeen where a prize is awarded each year in his name.

Born in Glasgow, he earned his MA in English Language and Literature at the University of Glasgow in 1907, and his BA in Modern History at Balliol College, Oxford, in 1910. From Oxford he won the Arnold Prize in 1913 for his study of Anglo-French relations during the reign of Elizabeth I. Black was appointed Lecturer in British History at Glasgow 1910, and in the Great War served as a Lieutenant in the Highland Light Infantry 1916–1918, and was a prisoner of war in 1918. Following the war in 1919 he moved to Queen's University at Kingston, Ontario, where he was a professor of Modern History. In 1920 he relocated to the University of Sheffield as Professor of Modern History, serving as Dean of the Faculty of Arts from 1923 to 1930. In 1930 Black moved to Aberdeen to take up the Burnett-Fletcher Chair.

His 1926 work The Art of History, though now superseded, was the first important scholarly consideration of Enlightenment historiography in the twentieth century. It was an examination of Voltaire, David Hume, William Robertson and Edward Gibbon.

He is best known for The Reign of Elizabeth (1936) the second volume of the Oxford History of England series to appear (although it was Volume 8 in the 15-volume series).

Among other works, he also offered a short paper on Hector Boece's Historia Gentis Scotorum in a volume which he co-authored with W. Douglas Simpson, on the occasion of the Quatercentenary of the Death of Hector Boece, first Principal of the University.

Black received an Hon. LLD from Glasgow in 1949, and from Aberdeen in 1954, where he also served as Dean of the Faculty of Arts from 1939 to 1942 and as a member of the Court from 1939 to 1947. He died on 25 November 1964.
