= David White Finlay =

Scottish physician and yachtsman

Professor David White Finlay FRSE FRCP

Professor of Practice of Medicine, University of Aberdeen
- In office 1891–1912

Personal details
- Born: 1 September 1840 Glasgow, Scotland
- Died: 4 November 1923 (aged 83) Helensburgh, Dunbartonshire, Scotland
- Occupation: Physician

David White Finlay (1 September 1840 – 4 November 1923) was a Scottish physician and yachtsman. He was Regius Professor of Medicine at Aberdeen University 1891 to 1912. He was Honorary Physician to the King in Scotland to both King Edward VII and King George V.

== Life ==
He was born at 6 Ure Place in Glasgow on 1 September 1840, the son of James Finlay, a partner in the firm of Finlay & Neilson. He attended Glasgow High School before studying medicine at Glasgow University graduating BA in 1860 and gaining his doctorate (MD) in 1864. After some years of foreign travel and further studies (including Vienna) he settled in London in 1873. He then worked in St James and St Georges Dispensary, and in the Stone Hospital before moving to the Middlesex Hospital. In 1881 he began lecturing in both Forensic Medicine. In 1883 he undertook a Diploma in Public Health at Cambridge University adding this to his lecturing thereafter, and then added Practical Medicine to his repertoire in 1884.

In 1891 he gained a chair at Aberdeen University and left London. He also took on a role as Physician at Aberdeen Royal Infirmary. In 1899 he was elected a Fellow of the Royal Society of Edinburgh. His proposers were Sir William Thomson, Lord Kelvin, John Gray McKendrick, John Glaister and Sir Thomas Oliver. He served on the General Medical Council from 1901 to 1911. In 1907 he became Dean of the Faculty of Medicine at Aberdeen.

In 1912 he retired to Helensburgh but came out of retirement in 1914 to assist during the First World War serving at the Scottish National Red Cross Hospital in Bellahouston at the rank of Lt Colonel in the Royal Army Medical Corps.

He died in Helensburgh on 4 November 1923.

== Publications ==
- Reminiscences of Yacht Races and some Racing Yachts (1910)

== Family ==
David White Finlay was born on 1 September 1840 to James Finlay (died 13/5/1849) and Isabella White. He had 4 brothers, John (1830-1854), Alexander (1833-1895), James (1836-1910) and William Neilson (1842-1903). John died aged 23 in Malta when on a trip to the Holy Land. Alexander was a Seascape Painter. James was a GP in Helensburgh when A J Cronin (writer of Dr. Finlay's Casbook) was in his youth in Helensburgh. In Aug 1878 in Marylebone, London David married Catherine Mary Thompson, daughter of the shipowner, Stephen Thompson. They had four sons and four daughters viz. Ronald Stephen (1879-1884), Brenda Mary (1880-1952), Kenneth George ( 1882-1974), James (1884-1884), Oliver (1884-1950), Ruth Averill (1885-1937), Lesley (1886-1923) and Marjorie Niven (1889-1980). Both David's parents died when he was young. His stepmother, Jane Niven, a native of Kirkoswald, brought up the 5 boys. David is buried in Helensburgh Cemetery with his wife and six of his eight children (excepting Ruth and Marjorie). His brother, James, and his stepmother, Jane Niven, are buried next to his grave. His son, Kenneth, composed several hymn tunes viz. Ayrshire, Finnart, Garelochside, Glenfinlas, Hamilton, Helensburgh, Land of our Birth, Praise to God and West Burn.
