= Burnett-Fletcher Chair of History =

The Burnett-Fletcher Chair of History at the University of Aberdeen, was founded in 1903. The professorship was established upon funds left by John Burnett, merchant in Aberdeen, and by Mary E. Fletcher, widow of Robert Fletcher. It is a general chair in history, not dedicated to a particular field or subject area. It was originally named the Burnett-Fletcher Chair of History and Archaeology.

== Holders of the Burnett-Fletcher Chair of History ==
- Professor C.S. Terry 1903–1930
- Professor J.B. Black 1930–1953
- Professor G.O. Sayles 1953–1962
- Professor John D. Hargreaves 1962–1985
- Professor Peter H. Ramsey 1986–1992
- Professor Allan I. Macinnes 1993–2007
- Vacant 2007–2013
- Professor Robert I. Frost 2013–present

== Bibliography ==
- Milne, Doreen J. (1998). A Century of History: The Establishment and First Century of the Department of History in the University of Aberdeen. Aberdeen: Centre for Scottish Studies for the Department of History. ISBN 9780906265246.
- Sayles, G. O. (1982). Scripta Diversa. History Series. Vol. 15. London: Hambledon Press. ISBN 0907628125.
