= George Dunnet =

Scottish ornithologist and ecologist (1928–1995)

George Mackenzie Dunnet CBE FRSE FIN FRSA (19 April 1928 – 11 September 1995) was a Scottish ornithologist and ecologist. He acted as an official advisor to the British government on ecological issues relating to the North Sea oil industry, salmon farming and the link (if any) between badgers and bovine tuberculosis. The latter resulted in a government report generally called the Dunnet Report.

He was the first Director of the Culterty Field Station (studying a variety of ecological issues) at Aberdeen University.

== Life ==
He was born at Dunnet in Caithness on 19 April 1928 the son of John George Dunnet. He was raised in Stuartfield and attended Peterhead Academy. He then went to Aberdeen University graduating BSc in 1949.

He worked briefly at the Bureau of Animal Populations in Oxford before undertaking a five-year study research trip to Australia as part of the Wildlife Survey Section of CSIRO, mainly concentrating on flea types on various species. He identified over 40 new species and subspecies during this period. He was then invited to head the new Culterty Research Station at Aberdeen University under Prof Vero Wynne-Edwards in 1957. He then succeeded Wynne-Edwards as Regius Professor of Natural History in 1974, continuing this role until 1992. He later served as Dean of the Faculty of Science for the university.

In 1970 he was elected a Fellow of the Royal Society of Edinburgh. His proposers were Vero Wynne-Edwards, John N Black, Julius Eggeling, and Charles Gimingham. He won the Society's Neill Prize for the period 1987–89.

He famously resigned from his role as principal (and sole) scientific advisor to Scottish Natural Heritage due to ongoing dissatisfaction with the SNH's lack of scientific input to their decision-making.

He was created a Commander of the Order of the British Empire (CBE) in the 1994 New Year's Honours List.

He died of a stroke whilst attending a conference in Copenhagen in Denmark on 11 September 1995. The conference was debating the ecological effects of the proposed Øresund Bridge.

== Positions of Note ==
- Chairman of the Salmon Advisory Committee 1986-1995
- Member of the Advisory Committee on Science to the Nature Conservancy Council
- Chairman of the Shetland Oil Terminal Environmental Advisory Group (SOTEAG)
- Chairman of the Review Team on Badgers and Bovine Tuberculosis

== Publications ==
- Fleas of British Mammals (1948)

== Family ==
He married Margaret ("Mom") Thomson in 1953. They had one son and two daughters (one of whom died).
