= William MacGillivray =

Scottish naturalist and ornithologist (1796–1852)

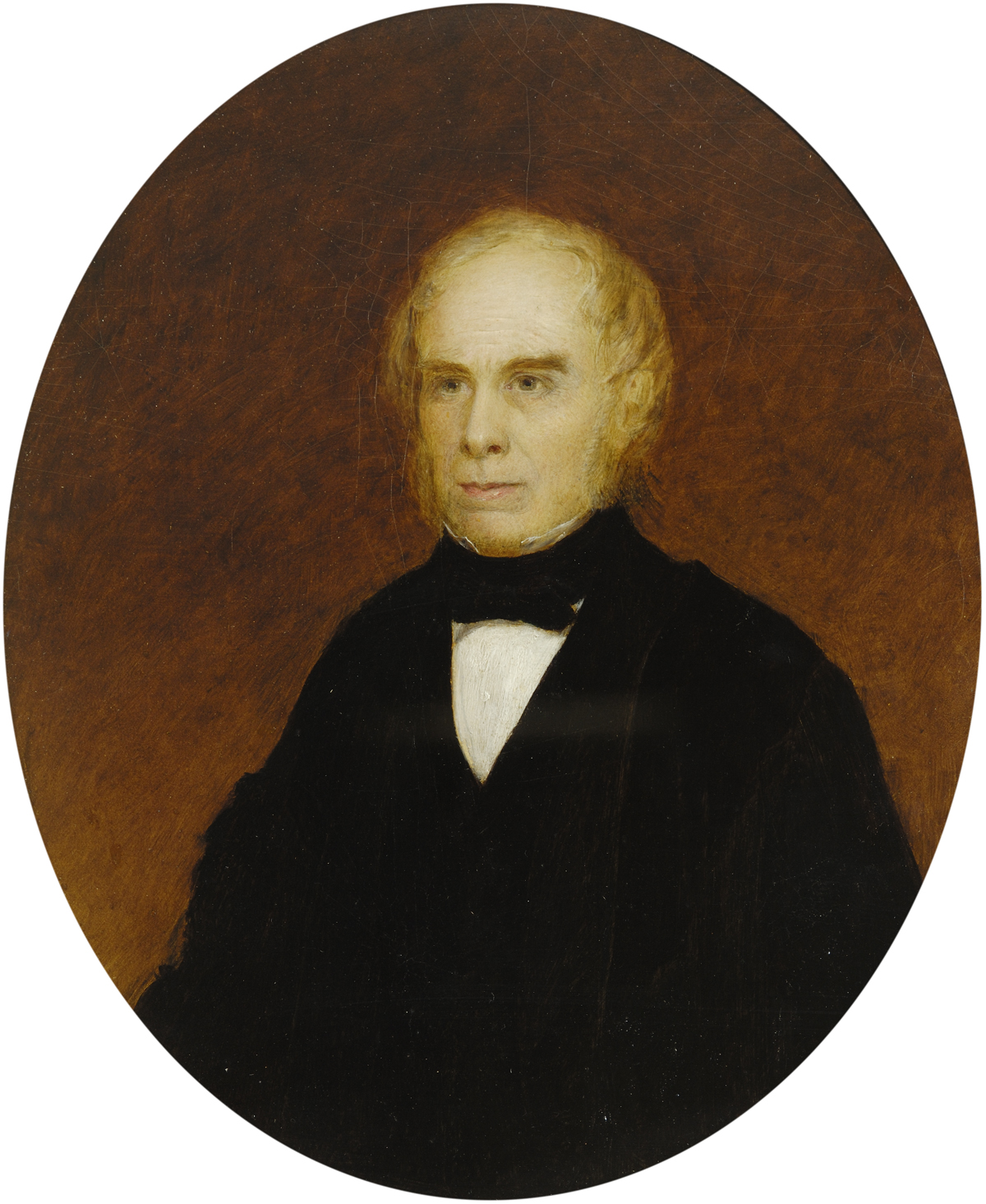
- William MacGillivray in middle age, probably in 1841; Collection of the University of Aberdeen
- Born: 25 January 1796; Old Aberdeen
- Died: 4 September 1852 (aged 56); Aberdeen
- Resting place: Edinburgh
- Scientific career
- Fields: Ornithology
- Workplaces: University of Aberdeen

William MacGillivray FRSE (25 January 1796 – 4 September 1852) was a Scottish naturalist and ornithologist.

== Early life and education ==
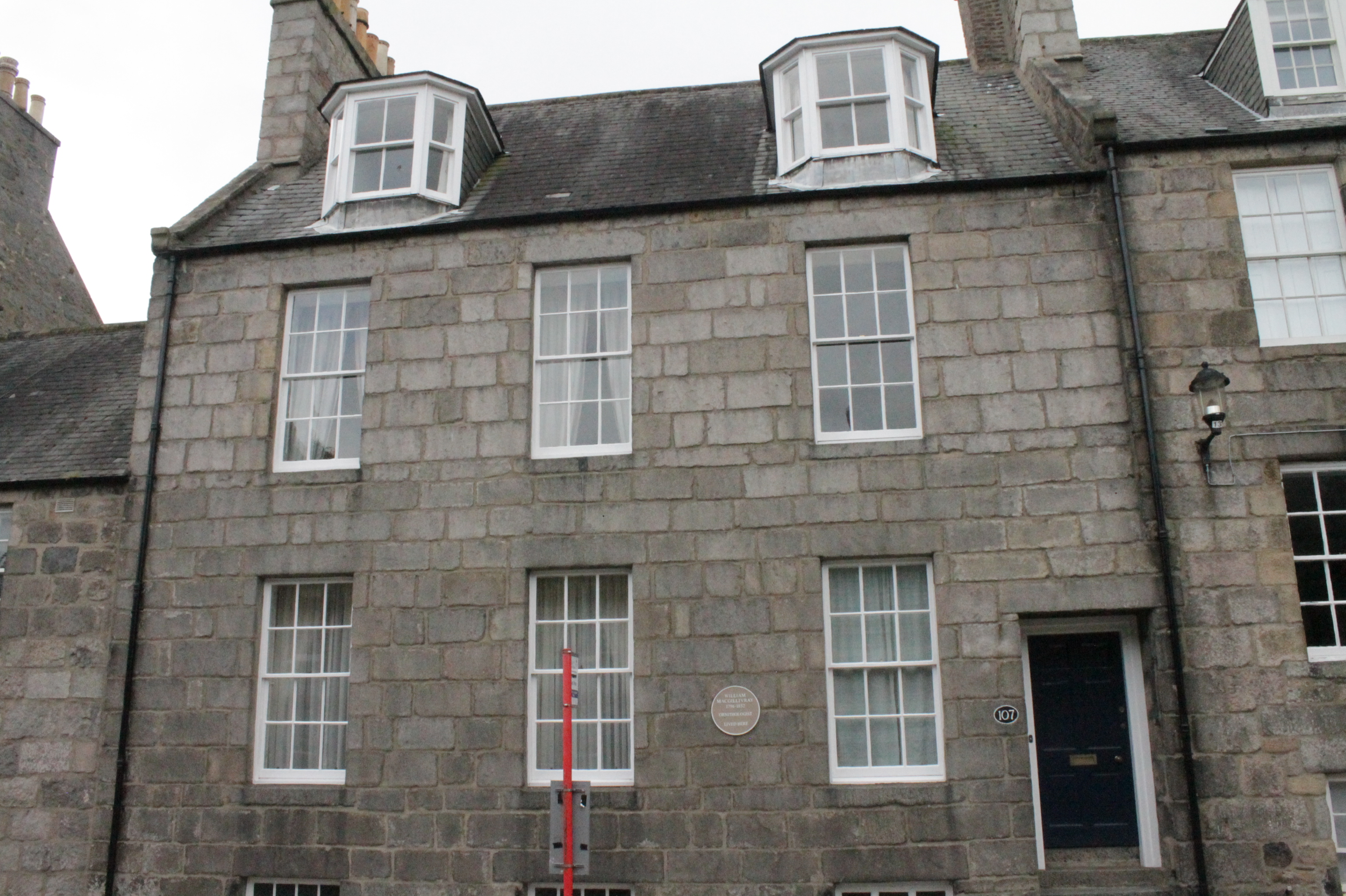
107 High Street, Old Aberdeen

MacGillivray was born in Old Aberdeen and brought up on Harris. He returned to Aberdeen where he studied medicine at King's College, graduating MA in 1815.

== Career ==
He was an Assistant Dissector in the Anatomy classes at King's College. In 1823 he became assistant to Robert Jameson, the Regius Professor of Natural History at the University of Edinburgh. He was curator of the museum of the Royal College of Surgeons of Edinburgh from 1831, resigning in 1841 to become Regius Professor of Natural History at Marischal College, Aberdeen.

MacGillivray was a friend of American bird expert John James Audubon. He wrote a large part of Audubon's Ornithological Biographies from 1830 to 1839. Audubon named MacGillivray's warbler for him.

MacGillivray correctly distinguished between the hooded crow and carrion crow, but they were considered only to be subspecies for the next one and a half centuries until, in 2002, on DNA evidence, the hooded crow was awarded species status.

== Personal life ==
In 1820 he married Marion Askill from Harris. The couple had 10 children, two of whom died in infancy. In Old Aberdeen, he lived at 107 High Street.

Two of MacGillivray's sons achieved recognition as naturalists. His eldest son, John MacGillivray (1822–1867), published an account of the voyage round the world of HMS Rattlesnake, to which he was the onboard naturalist. Another son, Paul, published an Aberdeen Flora in 1853, and donated 214 of his father's paintings to the Natural History Museum.

MacGillivray died at 67 Crown Street in Aberdeen on 5 September 1852 but is buried in New Calton Cemetery in Edinburgh. The grave faces east onto the eastern path.

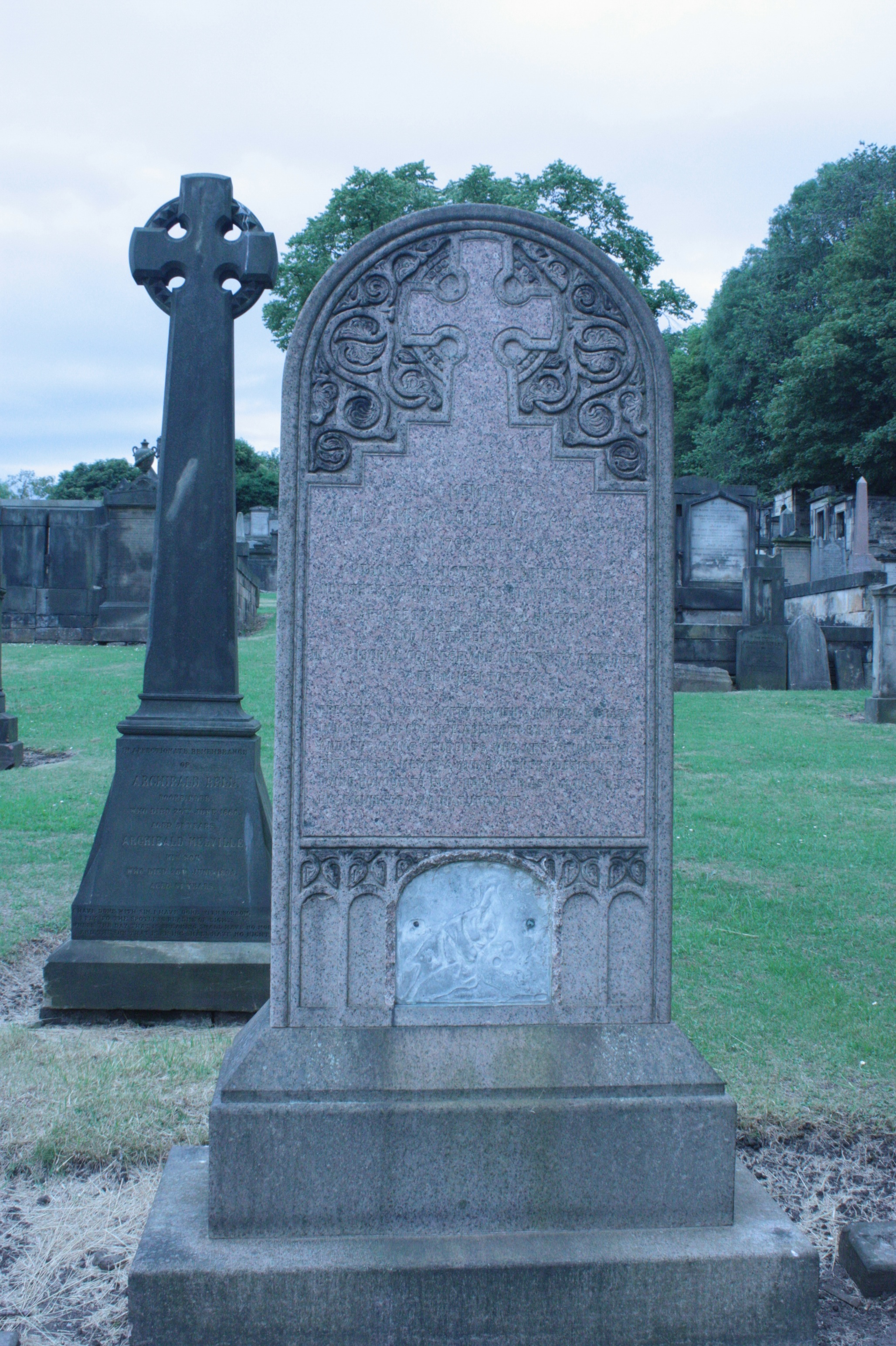
William MacGillivray's grave, New Calton Cemetery

== Legacy ==
A detailed version of MacGillivray's life, written by a namesake, was published 49 years after the ornithologist's death.

== Works ==
MacGillivray's works include:

- Lives of Eminent Zoologists from Aristotle to Linnaeus (1830)
- A Systematic Arrangement of British Plants (1830)
- The Travels and Researches of Alexander von Humboldt (1832)
- A History of British Quadrupeds (1838)
- A Manual of Botany, Comprising Vegetable Anatomy and Physiology (1840)
- A History of the Molluscous Animals of Aberdeen, Banff and Kincardine (1843)
- A Manual of British Ornithology (1840–1842)
- A History of British Birds, indigenous and migratory, in five volumes (1837–1852)
- Natural History of Deeside and Braemar (1855), published posthumously
- A Hebridean Naturalist's Journal 1817–1818 (1996), published posthumously
- A Walk to London (1998), published posthumously

MacGillivray illustrated Henry Witham's 1833 The Internal Structure of Fossil Vegetables found in the Carboniferous and Oolitic deposits of Great Britain, and edited The Conchologist's Text-Book through several editions. The standard author abbreviation W.MacGill. is used to indicate this person as the author when citing a botanical name.

== See also ==
- Thomas Bewick
- William Yarrell
