= Thomas Fraser (physician) =

Thomas Fraser (1872 - 1951) was a Scottish physician, who studied the effects of giving people extracts of fish pancreatic islets of Langerhans.

A graduate of the University of Aberdeen, he became a well-known medical doctor, teacher, and administrator in northern Scotland. During World War I, he served as lieutenant colonel, commanding the 89th (1st Highland) Ambulance, and was present at the Landing at Cape Helles. Later he served in France and London, and was awarded the Distinguished Service Order and Order of the British Empire. Between 1939 and 1942, he was president of the British Medical Association.

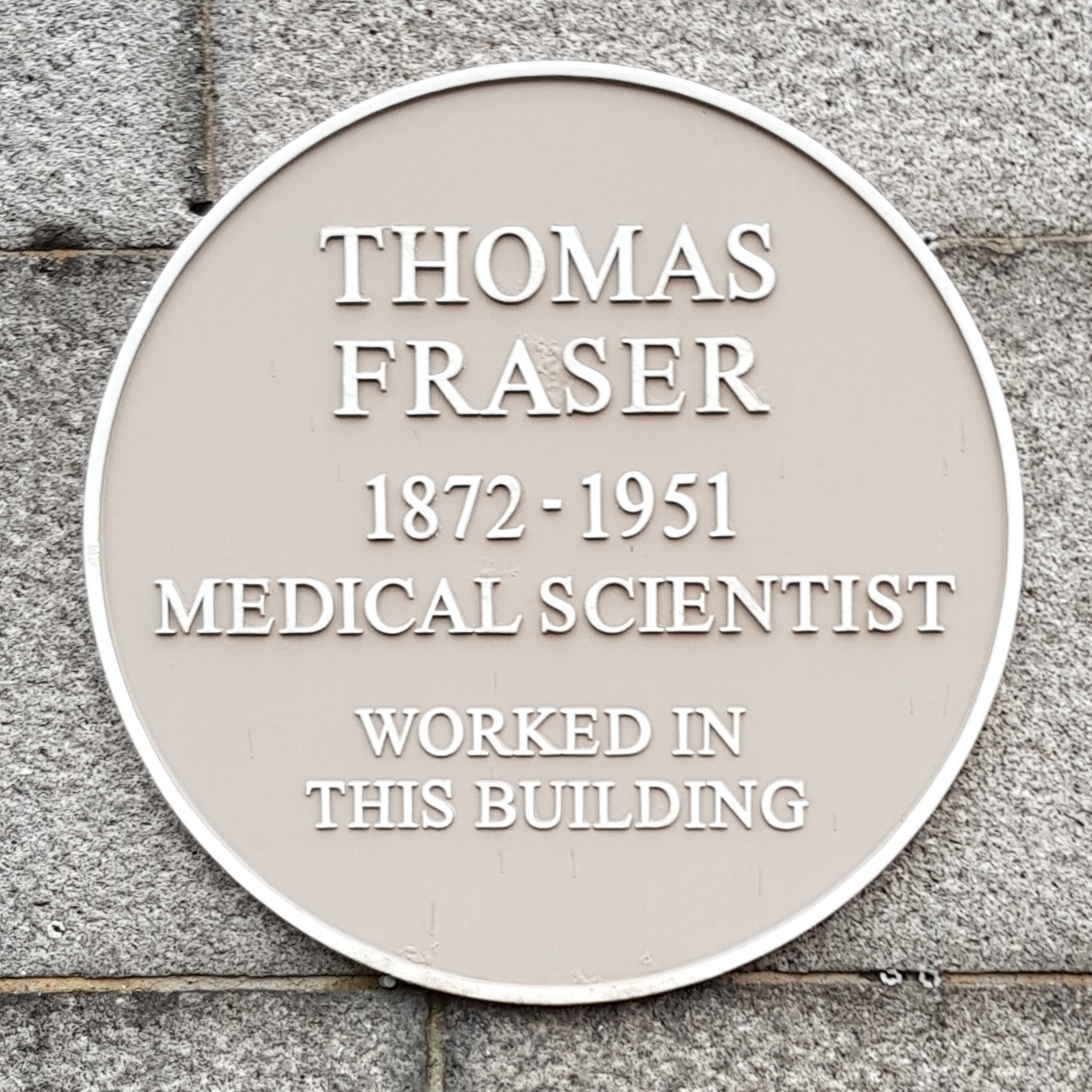
Thomas Fraser plaque

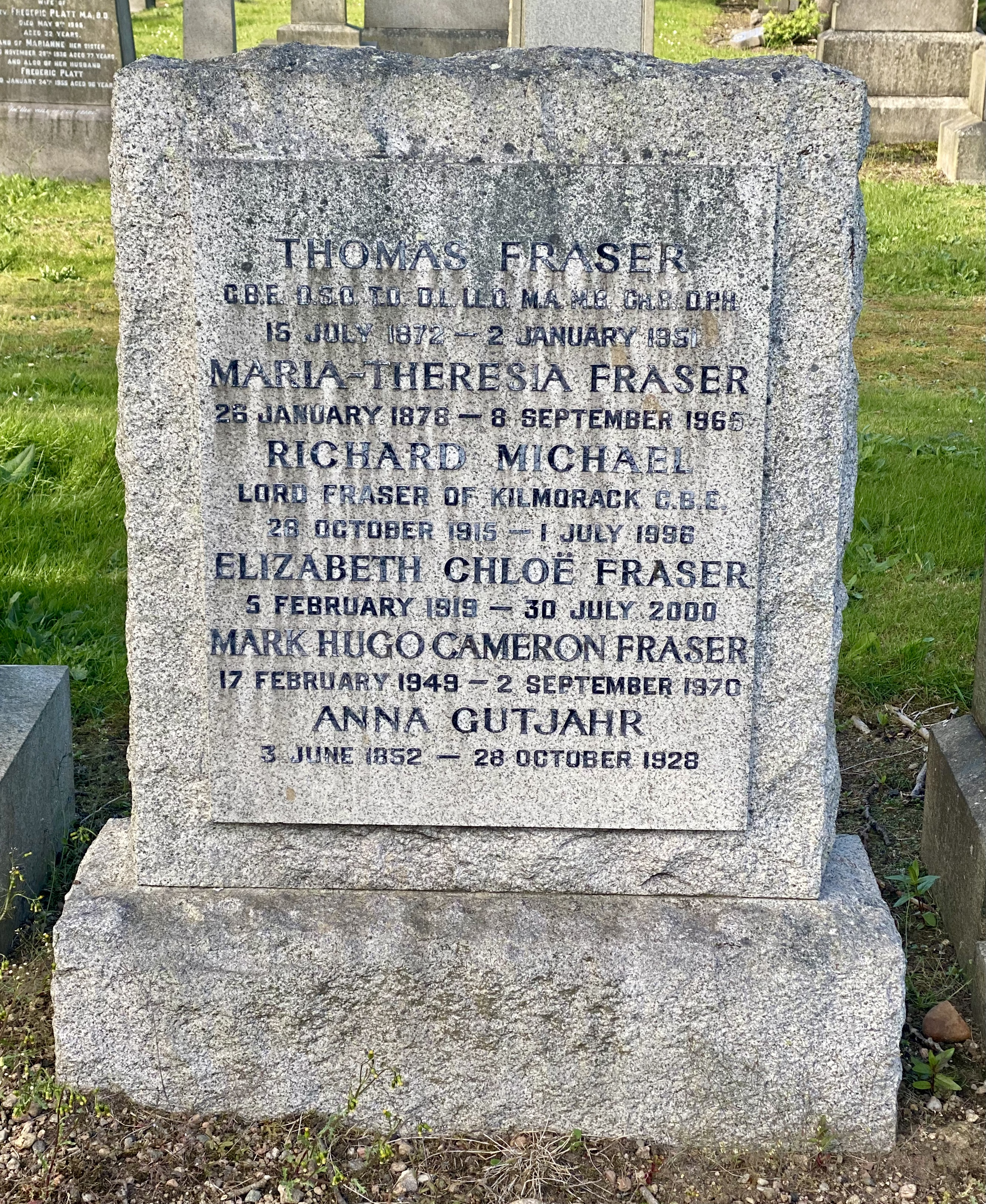
Thomas Fraser (1872–1951) gravestone
