= Regius Professor of Natural History (Aberdeen) =

The Regius Professor of Natural History is a Regius Professorship at the University of Aberdeen in Scotland. It was originally called the Regius Professor of Civil and Natural History at Marischal College until in 1860 Marischal College and King's Colleges merged to form the University of Aberdeen, and the title changed to Natural History.

Name	Tenure
Francis Skene	11 January 1753 – 1775
George Skene	1775–88
William Morgan	10 May 1788 – 2 September 1788
James Beattie	22 October 1788 – 5 October 1810
Rev Robert Rainy	1811 – 10 April 1811
James (Jas) Davidson	1 July 1811 – 19 February 1841
William MacGillivray	17 May 1841 – 5 September 1852
James Nicol	15 September 1853 – 15 September 1860
Name change to Natural History
James Nicol	15 September 1860 – 1878
James Cossar Ewart	1879-82
Henry Alleyne Nicholson	1882–99
John Arthur Thomson	1899–1930
James Ritchie	1930–36
Lancelot Thomas Hogben	1937–41
Alister Clavering Hardy	1942–45
Vero Copner Wynne-Edwards	1946–74
George Mackenzie Dunnet	1974–92
Paul Adrian Racey	1993–2009
Vacant	2009–14
Christopher John Secombes	2014 onwards
