= John D. Hargreaves =

British historian (1924–2015)

John Desmond Hargreaves (25 January 1924 – 14 February 2015) was the Burnett-Fletcher Professor of History at the University of Aberdeen.

Hargreaves was noted for his work on the history of Africa; its colonisation and de-colonisation. His career at Aberdeen began in 1954 when he was appointed as a lecturer in History. Hargreaves received his chair in 1962.

Hargreaves went part-time in 1982 and retired in 1985. A Festschrift was produced in his honour.

Hargreaves died on 14 February 2015 at the age of 91.

== Selected publications ==
- Hargreaves, John D. Prelude to the Partition of West Africa, London, Macmillan (1963).
- Hargreaves, John D. West Africa: The Former French States, Englewood Cliffs, N.J., Prentice-Hall (1967).
- Hargreaves, John D. West Africa Partitioned: The Loaded Pause, 1885-89. Vol. 1, London, Macmillan (1974).
- Hargreaves, John D. The End of Colonial Rule in West Africa, London, The Historical Association (1976).
- Hargreaves, John D. The End of Colonial Rule in West Africa: Essays in Contemporary History, London, Macmillan (1979).
- Hargreaves, John D. West Africa Partitioned: The Elephants and the Grass. Vol. 2, London, Macmillan (1985).
- Hargreaves, John D. Decolonization in Africa, London, Longman (1988; 2nd ed. 1996).

== Festschrift ==
- Bridges, Roy (1999) Imperialism, Decolonization and Africa: Studies Presented to John Hargreaves (Cambridge Imperial and Post-Colonial Studies Series) Basingstoke : Macmillan
