= Regius Professor of Medicine (Aberdeen) =

Professorship at the University of Aberdeen, Scotland

The Regius Professor of Medicine is an appointment held at the University of Aberdeen, in Scotland and was formally founded in 1858 by Queen Victoria.

The University of Aberdeen, however, states that this professorship was founded in 1497 and is the oldest regius chair in the English speaking world. That claim is based upon the establishment at King's College, Aberdeen, at the end of the 15th century of a teaching post known as the "Mediciner". The first recorded Mediciner was John Cumyne, appointed before 1522, but the role lapsed between 1571 and 1619 and it is stated that there were no lectures between 1793 and 1838.

The role of the Mediciner was much broader than the later concept of "professor of medicine" and described as follows:

"The study of medicine was, as has been mentioned in connection with the monasteries, regarded as an important branch of scholarship. At this time it was usual for well-educated men to include a knowledge of physics among their literary and philosophical studies, even when there was no intention of adopting medicine as a profession... The aim was to produce not a practitioner but a scholar, not craftmanship but erudition. Instruction in medicine, while it might be slight, was associated with a course in arts and philosophy. The person who received a degree was doctus in medicina - learned in medicine - but not necessarily a skilled practitioner of the craft".

The first "professor of medicine" at Aberdeen was at Marischal College in 1700 (first held by Patrick Chalmers). The formal establishment of a "Regius Chair" in medicine was in 1858 under the title of Regius Chair in Materia Medica, later renamed the Regius Chair in Medicine. That appears to have been merged with the earlier title of "professor of medicine" (1700) and "mediciner" (1522). Although technically "regally founded" by dint of being established following the inception of King's College, there is no evidence that it was known as the "Regius Chair of Medicine" prior to 1858.

== Holders ==
- 1860-1875 Professor John Macrobin Despite there being a letter's patent, Macrobin was refused the attribute Regius.
- 1875-1891 Professor James W. E. Smith Shand
- 1891-1912 Professor David White Finlay Finlay was addressed as Regius Professor of the Practice of Medicine.
- 1912-1928 Professor Ashley MacIntosh
- 1930-1938 Professor Stanley Davidson
- 1939-1948 Professor Robert Aitken
- 1948-1970 Professor Harold Williams Fullerton
- 1970-1985 Professor Alexander Stuart Douglas
- 1985-1993 Professor Richard Himsworth
- 1994-2007 Professor Andrew Rees
- 2009-2015 Professor Michael Frenneaux
