= Alexander Stuart Douglas =

Scottish physician (1921–1998)

Professor Alexander Stuart Douglas FRSE FRCP
- Born: 2 October 1921; Elgin, Moray, Scotland
- Died: 15 November 1998 (aged 77)
- Occupation: Physician

Alexander Stuart Douglas (2 October 1921 – 15 November 1998) was a physician and haematologist. He was Regius Professor of Medicine at Aberdeen University from 1970 to 1985.

He received international acclaim for his discoveries in relation to blood coagulation, causes of abnormal bleeding, and causes of thrombosis. He played a key role in identifying the role of anticoagulants and antiplatelet agents in preventing heart attacks, setting a modern benchmark for the treatment of heart disease.

He was one of the two people in 1951 establishing that Haemophilia split into two groups: isolating what is now commonly called Haemophilia B, then known as Christmas disease after its first known host, Stephen Christmas.

== Life ==
He was born in Elgin in northern Scotland, on 2 October 1921, and was the son of Robert Douglas (1871–1948), a crofter. He was educated at Elgin Academy. He studied medicine at Glasgow University graduating BSc in 1941. In 1944, Glasgow University granted him MB ChB.

From 1945 to 1948 he served as a Major in the Royal Army Medical Corps in the post-war re-establishment of Palestine and was Mentioned in Dispatches.

After this period he worked in the Blood Coagulation Research Unit in Oxford with Robert Gwyn Macfarlane. Jointly they isolated and identified the condition now known as Haemophilia B, but then known as Christmas Disease after its first identified sufferer, Stephen Christmas.

From 1953, he was a lecturer in medicine at Glasgow University. In 1965 he was seconded to Nairobi University. In 1970, he was awarded the chair in Medicine at Aberdeen University.

In 1993, in his old age, he was elected a Fellow of the Royal Society of Edinburgh. His proposers were Prof John Mallard, S C Frazer, Prof E M McGirr, H M Keir, Prof John Anderson Strong, Prof Hans Kosterlitz, I A McGregor, and F W Robertson.

He died on 15 November 1998, aged 77.

== Family ==
His wife was Christina and they had one son and one daughter.

== Publications ==
- Seasonal Variation in Health and Diseases (1994)
