= Paul Racey =

British zoologist

Paul Adrian Racey FRSE is a British zoologist specialising in mammalian reproductive biology and bat ecology. He served as Regius Professor of Natural History at the University of Aberdeen from 1993 until his retirement in 2009, and subsequently held an honorary visiting professorship at the University of Exeter. He is widely regarded as a leading authority on bats, and the species Pipistrellus raceyi was named in his honour.

== Career ==
In 1973 Racey was appointed Lecturer in Zoology at the University of Aberdeen, progressing to Senior Lecturer (1980) and then to a personal chair as Professor of Zoology (1985). He served as Head of the Department of Zoology from 1987 to 1993. In 1993 he was appointed Regius Professor of Natural History, a chair he held until his retirement in 2009.

Following his retirement, Racey was awarded a Leverhulme Emeritus Fellowship (2010–2011) to continue research on bat ecology and conservation in Madagascar. Since 2007 he has held an Honorary Visiting Professorship at the Centre for Ecology and Conservation, University of Exeter.

== Research ==
Racey's principal research interests are mammalian reproductive biology, bat ecology, and conservation biology. At Aberdeen he established five research groups covering: the ecology of temperate-zone bats; animal energetics; marine mammalogy; molecular genetics in ecology; and the ecology and conservation of Malagasy bats.

His work on bat reproduction demonstrated that bats are the only mammals with a variable gestation period. He and his group also showed that radar can deter bats from approaching wind turbines. Over the course of his career Racey has published more than 200 scientific papers and co-edited several books, including Bat Biology and Conservation (1998, with Thomas H. Kunz) and Island Bats (2009, with T.H. Fleming).

His research group in Madagascar, established in 1998 with Darwin Initiative funding, contributed to the founding of the conservation NGO Madagasikara Voakajy in 2005, which works on the ecology and conservation of bats, chameleons, frogs, and birds in Madagascar.

== Conservation and professional roles ==
Racey was one of the founders of the Bat Conservation Trust and served as its first elected chairman from 1990 to 1996, subsequently becoming a Vice President and Science and Conservation Advisor. He served on the Scientific Advisory Board of Bat Conservation International from 1985 onwards, and chaired the IUCN Species Survival Commission Bat Specialist Group from 1986 to 2015.

== Honours and awards ==
- Gerrit S. Miller Award, North American Society for Bat Research (1995) – for outstanding service and contribution to chiropteran biology
- Silver Medal, Mammal Society (1996) – for outstanding contribution to mammalian reproduction and ecology
- Named one of 50 "Conservation Heroes" by BBC Wildlife (2008)
- Lifetime Achievement Award, Bat Conservation Trust (2009)
- Honorary Membership, American Society of Mammalogists (2010) – for distinguished service to mammalogy
- Honorary Life Membership, Bat Conservation Trust (2015)

== Selected publications ==
- Kunz, T.H. and Racey, P.A. (eds.) (1998). Bat Biology and Conservation. Smithsonian Institution Press. ISBN 1560988258
- Hutson, A.M., Mickleburgh, S.P., and Racey, P.A. (2001). Microchiropteran Bats: Global Status Survey and Conservation Action Plan. IUCN, Gland, Switzerland.
- Fleming, T.H. and Racey, P.A. (eds.) (2009). Island Bats: Evolution, Ecology, and Conservation. University of Chicago Press.
