= James Cossar Ewart =

Scottish zoologist (1851-1933)

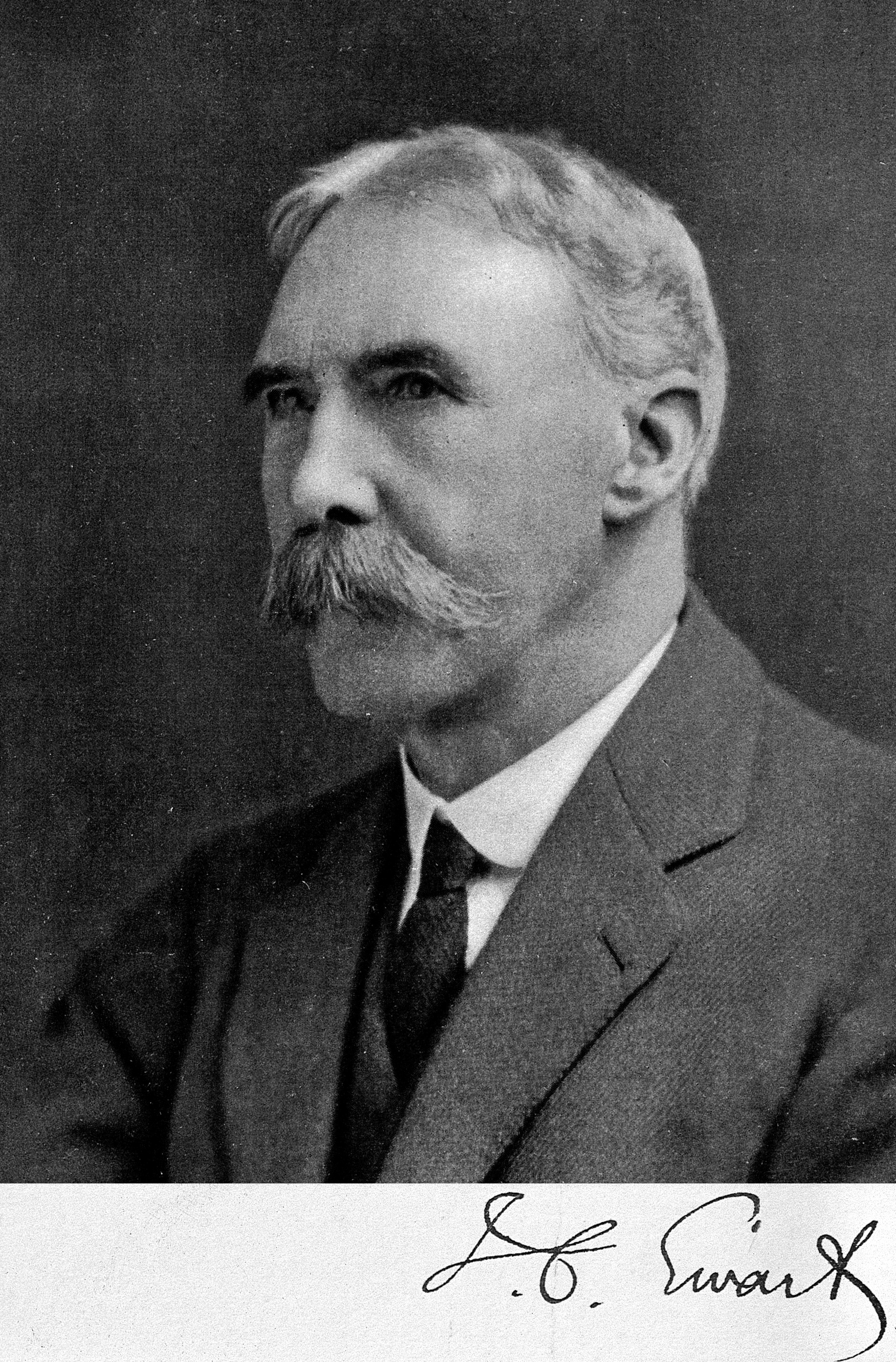

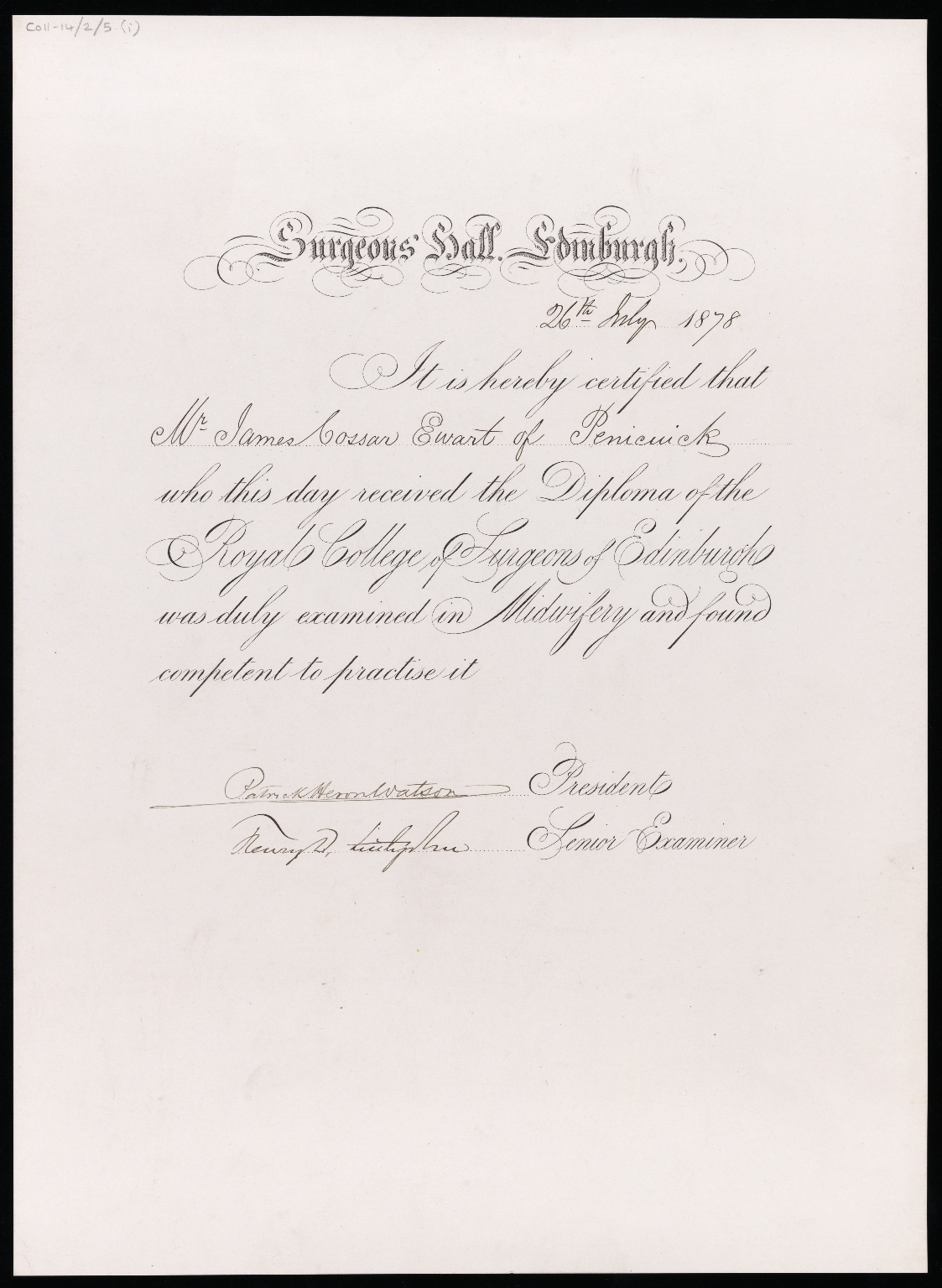
The Diploma of the Royal College of Surgeons of Edinburgh, awarded to James Cossar Ewart in 1878.

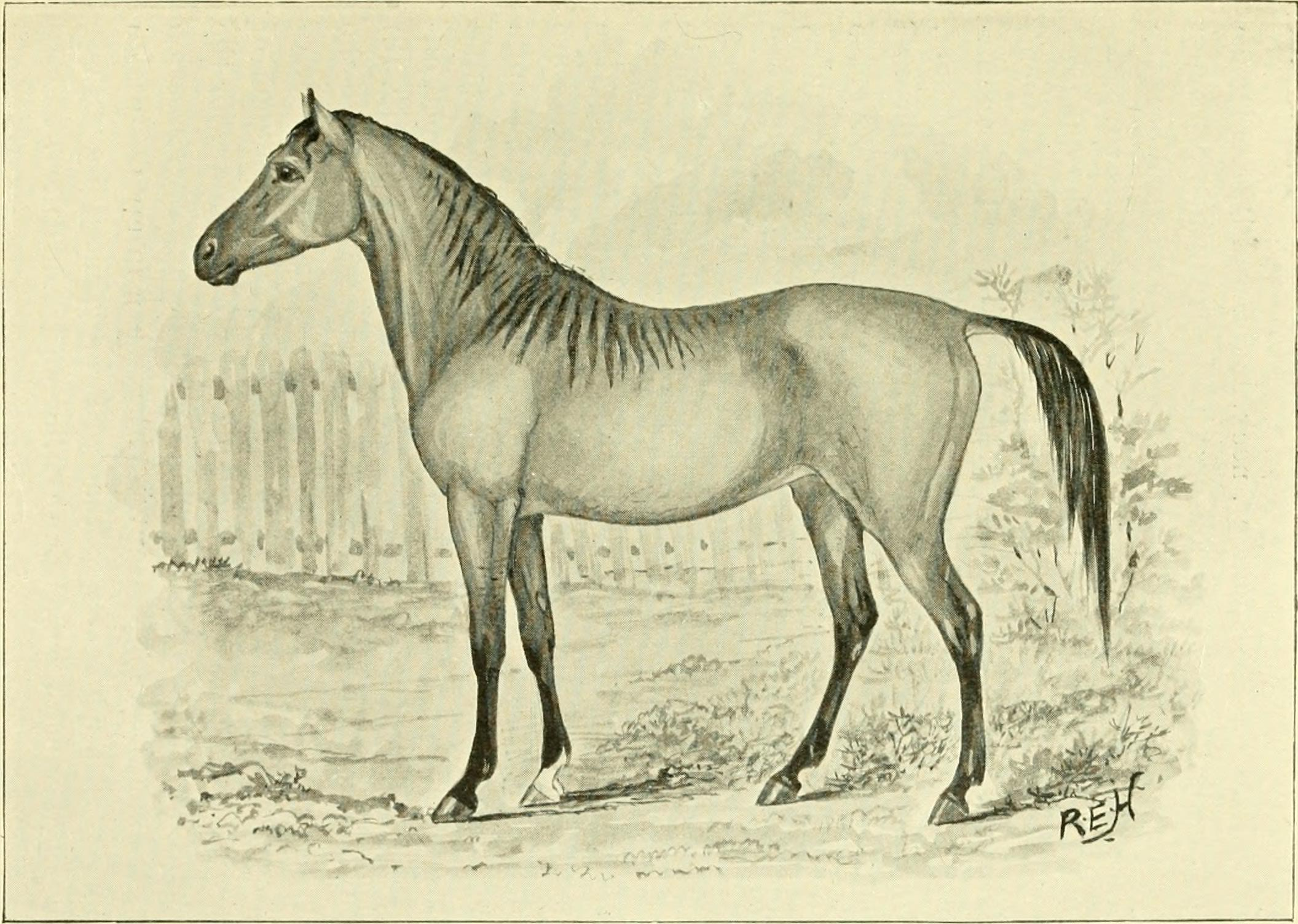
One of Ewart's creations from The Penycuik Experiments

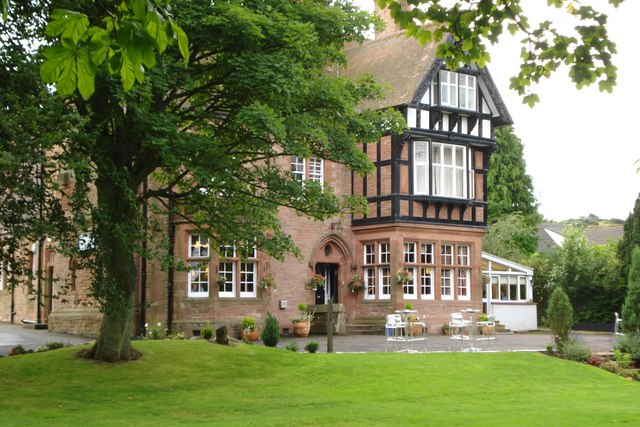
Ewart's house in Penicuik

James Cossar Ewart FRS FRSE (26 November 1851 – 31 December 1933) was a Scottish zoologist. He performed breeding experiments with horses and zebras which disproved earlier theories of heredity.

== Life ==
Ewart was born in Penicuik, Midlothian, Scotland, the son of Jean Cossar and John Ewart, a joiner. He studied medicine from 1871 to 1874 at the University of Edinburgh where he graduated with an MB ChB. After graduation, he became an anatomy demonstrator under William Turner and then held the position of Curator of the Zoological Museum at University College, London, where he assisted Ray Lankester (later director of the Natural History Museum) by making zoological preparations for the museum and providing teaching support for Lankester's course in practical zoology. In 1878 he returned to Scotland to take a post of Regius Professor of Natural History at the University of Aberdeen from where he moved to the University of Edinburgh in 1882, staying in the post until 1927. In Aberdeen he encountered James Duncan Matthews, a mature student (older than himself) and they became friends until Matthew's premature death in 1890.

In 1879 he was elected a Fellow of the Royal Society of Edinburgh. His proposers were Sir William Turner, William Rutherford, William Rutherford Sanders and John Chiene. He won the Society's Neill Prize for 1895-98 and served as their Vice-President 1907 to 1912.

In 1890 he was elected a member of the Harveian Society of Edinburgh. He was elected a Fellow of the Royal Society in June 1893, having jointly delivered their Croonian Lecture in 1881.

Among various other studies, he performed breeding experiments with horses and zebras. He carried out these experiments at "The Bungalow", now the Navaar House in Penicuik, well before the rediscovery of Gregor Mendel's works. Ewart crossed a male zebra with a female pony to show that the theory of telegony inherited from the Greeks was unsound. Telegony held that a female with a history of mating with multiple males would pass on genetic qualities of all previous partners to her offspring. Ewart later bred the mare which had produced zebra-horse hybrids with a pony, and the offspring showed no zebra qualities in either markings or temperament. Ewart's goal was also to produce a draught animal for South African conditions, resistant to African diseases and more tractable than a mule.

In 1883 he commissioned George Washington Browne to design a grand new house in Penicuik, finished in 1885, which is where he died on New Year's Eve 1933/34. It is now the Craigiebield House Hotel.

== Family ==
He married three times, his first wife being the sister of Edward Albert Sharpey-Schafer.

== Publications ==
- The Penycuik Experiments (1899)
