= James Learmonth =

Scottish surgeon (1895–1967)

Sir James Rögnvald Learmonth KCVO CBE FRSE FRCSE
- Born: 23 March 1895; Gatehouse of Fleet, Kirkcudbrightshire, Scotland
- Died: 27 September 1967 (aged 72); Broughton, Scottish Borders
- Spouse: Charlotte Newell Bundy (m. 1925)
- Children: 2

Academic background
- Education: Kilmarnock Academy
- Alma mater: University of Glasgow

Academic work
- Discipline: Surgery
- Sub-discipline: Neurosurgery
- Institutions: University of Aberdeen

Sir James Rögnvald Learmonth KCVO CBE FRSE FRCSE (1895–1967) was a Scottish surgeon who made pioneering advances in nerve surgery.

== Early years ==
James Rögnvald Learmonth was born on 23 March 1895 in Gatehouse of Fleet, Kirkcudbrightshire, Scotland. He first studied at Girthon School where his father, William Learmonth, was headmaster, later moving to Kilmarnock Academy. From there, he went to the University of Glasgow to study medicine, starting in the autumn of 1913. He completed his first year, but further study was interrupted by the outbreak of World War I. He served in France on the Western Front as a commissioned officer with the King's Own Scottish Borderers. By the end of the war, he had attained the rank of captain.

== Medical career ==
After the war, Learmonth returned to the University of Glasgow and added to the honours he had received in his first year, graduating in 1921. He was considered the "outstanding medical student of his year", being awarded the university's Brunton Medal. He then continued his medical training at Glasgow's Western Infirmary during 1921 and 1922. This was followed by a period of research that led to a Rockefeller Scholarship at the Mayo Clinic in Rochester, Minnesota, USA, for the year 1924–5.

Following his research work in the US, he returned to Scotland and resumed his work at the Western Infirmary in Glasgow. He also continued to study and in 1927 he obtained his Masters in Surgery (Ch.M.) and in 1928 he became a Fellow of the Royal College of Surgeons of Edinburgh. His research work led to him being invited back to the Mayo Clinic for a second time, and he worked there for the next four years.

In 1932, Learmonth chose to give up his practice in the US and returned to Scotland to take up the position of Regius Professor of Surgery at the University of Aberdeen, a position he would hold for the next six years until 1938. He then held professorships in surgery at the University of Edinburgh from 1939 until his retirement in 1956. The first was the Chair of Surgery (1939), which he then held jointly with the Regius Chair of Clinical Surgery (1946). One of his students at Edinburgh during this period was Sheila Sherlock, who became a pioneering hepatologist.

In 1949, Learmonth performed a lumbar sympathectomy on King George VI to treat the king's vascular disease (thromboangiitis obliterans). For this service, Learmonth was made a Knight Commander of the Royal Victorian Order (KCVO), being "knighted in the king's bedroom". He was also appointed as a surgeon to the King in Scotland, and following his death as a surgeon to the new Queen in Scotland from 1952 to 1960.

== Awards and honours ==
Learmonth's awards and honours include being appointed Fellow of the Royal Society of Edinburgh (1944), Commander of The Most Excellent Order of the British Empire (1945), honorary Fellow of the Royal College of Surgeons of England (1949), and chevalier of the Légion d'honneur (1951). He was elected to the Harveian Society of Edinburgh and the Aesculapian Club in 1949. He was also awarded the 1951 Lister Medal for his contributions to surgical science. The corresponding Lister Oration, given at the Royal College of Surgeons of England, was delivered on 4 April 1952, and was titled 'After Fifty-Six Years'.

Learmonth was also recognised with honorary Doctor of Laws (LL.D.) degrees from the University of Glasgow (1949), the University of Strasbourg, the University of Paris, the University of St Andrews, the University of Edinburgh, the University of Oslo, and the University of Sydney. He was also made honorary Fellow of the American College of Surgeons (1950), the Royal Australasian College of Surgeons (1954), and the Royal Faculty of Physicians and Surgeons of Glasgow (1954).

== Final years ==
Learmonth retired in 1956 at the age of 61. He moved to Broughton with his wife, Charlotte Newell Bundy, whom he had met and married in 1925 during his first period working at the Mayo Clinic. Charlotte was the daughter of F. G. and Nellie Bundy, of St. Johnsbury, Vermont, USA. They had two children, a son and a daughter. In his retirement, Learmonth worked as an assessor for the University of Glasgow. Early in 1967, Learmonth, who was a heavy smoker, was diagnosed with lung cancer; he died at his home in Broughton later that year on 27 September 1967.

Obituaries were published in the Annals of the Royal College of Surgeons of England, The British Medical Journal, The Lancet, and the Glasgow University Gazette. One of the tributes in the British Medical Journal stated that Learmonth "ranks with William Mayo, Harvey Cushing and Geoffrey Jefferson as one of the surgical giants of our time".
