= Parkland =

Parkland often refers to a park.

Parkland or Parklands may also refer to:

== Geography ==
- Aspen parkland, a biome transitional between prairie and boreal forest (taiga)
- Landscaped parkland, a managed rural area associated with European country houses

== Places ==
=== Australia ===
- Adelaide Park Lands, the figure eight of green space surrounding the Adelaide CBD and North Adelaide, South Australia
- Parklands, Tasmania, a suburb of Burnie
- Parklands, Western Australia, a suburb of Mandurah

=== Canada ===
- Parkland, Calgary, Alberta, a neighborhood in the city of Calgary
- Parkland County, a municipal district in Alberta, Canada
  - Sturgeon River—Parkland, a federal electoral district in central Alberta
  - Parkland (electoral district), a federal electoral district in central Alberta
- Parkland Region, a region in Manitoba, Canada

=== United States ===
- Parkland, Florida, a suburban city
- Parkland, Illinois, an unincorporated community
- Parkland, Louisville, Kentucky, a neighborhood
- Parkland, Detroit, Michigan, a neighborhood
- Parkland, Philadelphia, a section of Philadelphia which houses a majority of Philadelphia's public parks
- Parkland, Washington
- Parkland, Wisconsin, a town
- Parkland (community), Wisconsin, an unincorporated community

=== Elsewhere ===
- Parklands, Nairobi, Kenya; a suburb of Nairobi
- Parklands, New Zealand, a suburb of Christchurch
- Parklands, Cape Town, South Africa; a suburb of Cape Town
- Parklands, Newcastle upon Tyne, England, UK; a district of the British city

== Facilities and structures ==
- Parklands Hotel, a hotel in Perth, Scotland, UK

=== Schools ===
- Parkland College, Illinois, USA; a community college located in Champaign
- Parkland College (Saskatchewan), Canada; a junior, regional, and community college with several campuses in northeastern Saskatchewan
- Parklands College, Parklands, South Africa; a pre-primary through secondary private school
- Parkland Middle School, Rockville, Maryland, USA
- Parkland Secondary School, North Saanich, Vancouver Island, British Columbia, Canada
- Parkland High School (disambiguation)

=== Medical facilities ===
- Parkland Health & Hospital System, a hospital district in Dallas, Texas, USA
- Parkland Medical Center, a hospital in Derry, New Hampshire, USA
- Parkland Memorial Hospital, a public hospital in Dallas, Texas, USA

== Groups, organizations, companies ==
- Parkland Fuel, a Canadian fuel company based in Calgary, Alberta
- Parkland Conference, Wisconsin, a defunct conference in the Wisconsin Interscholastic

== Films ==
- Parklands (film), a 1996 Australian film
- Parkland (film), a 2013 American film about the aftermath of the assassination of John F. Kennedy
- Song of Parkland, an HBO documentary film about the Parkland high school shooting

== Other ==
- Parkland formula, used in medicine
- Parkland high school shooting, a 2018 mass shooting in Parkland, Florida

== See also ==
- Park (disambiguation)
- Land (disambiguation)
