= North Philadelphia West =

Coordinates: 39.9860°N 75.1717°W

- Neighborhood of Philadelphia
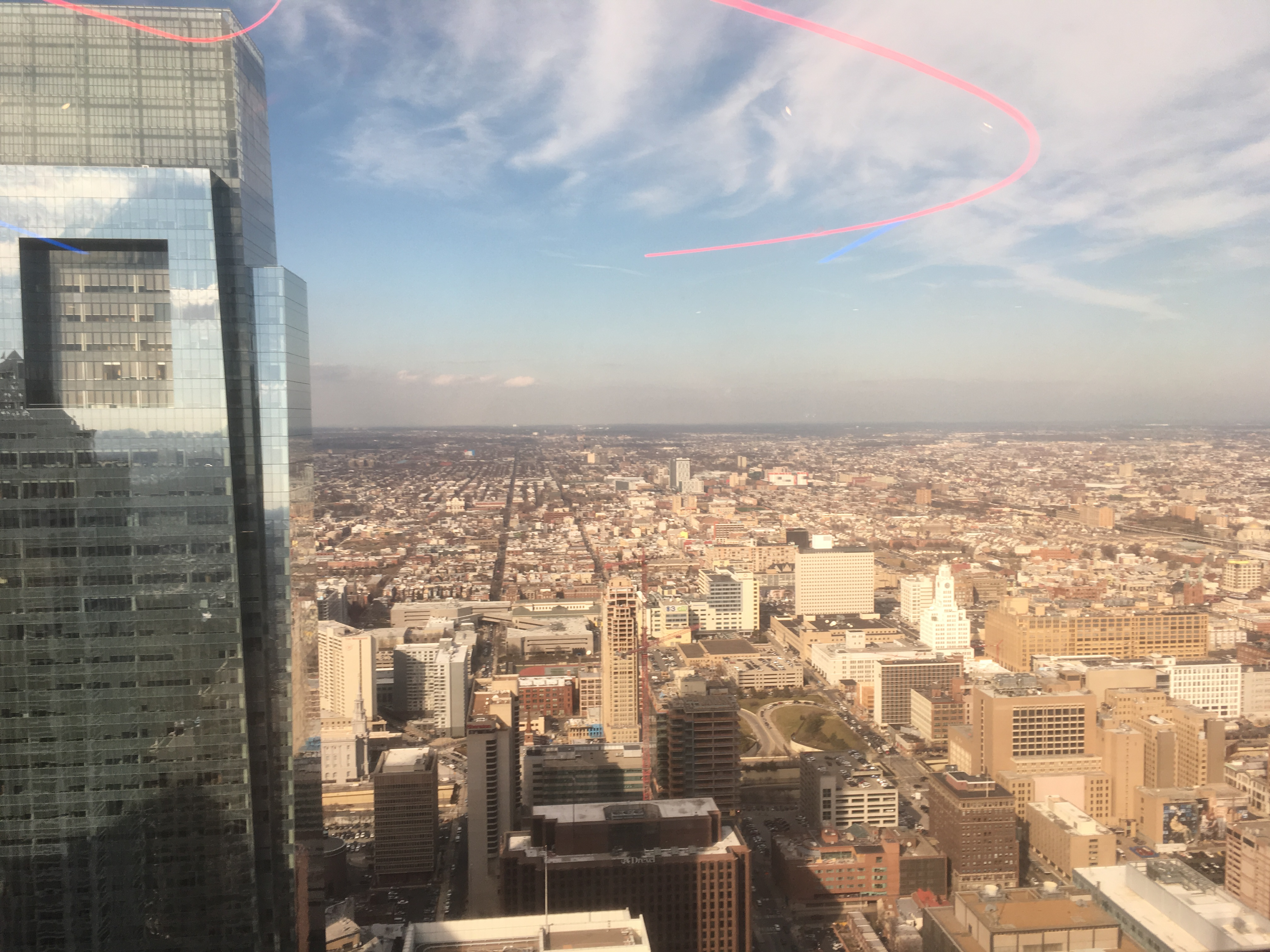

- Location within Philadelphia
- Country: United States
- State: Pennsylvania
- County: Philadelphia
- City: Philadelphia
- Postal code: 19132
- Area codes: 215, 267 and 445

North Philadelphia West is a neighborhood that is located in the western central part of the North Philadelphia section of Philadelphia, Pennsylvania, United States, east of the Schuylkill River.

== History and notable features ==
North Philadelphia West is a section of North Philadelphia that is located west of North Broad St. It is bordered by Poplar Street and West Girard Avenue in the south, West Lehigh Avenue in the north and Ridge Avenue in the west. North Philadelphia West is bordered by the neighborhoods of North Philadelphia/East, Fairmount, Parkland and Allegheny West.

The Stanton neighborhood is bounded by York Street to the north, 16th Street to the east, Sedgley Avenue to the west, and Cecil B. Moore Avenue to the south.

North Central, Philadelphia is located to the east of North Philadelphia West.

A district office plan was proposed as a future major development.

The neighborhood's zip codes are 19121, 19129, 19130, and 19132.

== Demographics ==
In March 2018, the section had a 20.95% unemployment rate with 45.96% living in poverty.
