= Cocoanut Grove fire =

1942 nightclub fire in Boston, Massachusetts, US

- The Shawmut Street side of the Cocoanut Grove nightclub after the fire

- Cocoanut Grove fire (Greater Boston area) Cocoanut Grove fire (Boston)
- Date: November 28, 1942
- Time: Around 10:15 pm
- Location: Bay Village, Boston, Massachusetts, U.S.; 42°21′0″N 71°4′6″W
- Cause: Ignition of decorative cloth
- Deaths: 492
- Injuries: 130
- Suspects: Barney Welansky
- Charges: Manslaughter, numerous building code and safety violations
- Verdict: Guilty
- Convictions: Manslaughter

The Cocoanut Grove fire was a nightclub fire in Boston, Massachusetts, US on November 28, 1942, which resulted in the deaths of 492 people. It is the deadliest nightclub fire in history and the third-deadliest single-building fire in the United States (after the September 11 attacks and Iroquois Theatre fire). The Cocoanut Grove was one of Boston's most popular nightspots, attracting many celebrity visitors. It was owned by Barnet "Barney" Welansky, who was closely connected to the Mafia and Mayor Maurice J. Tobin. Fire regulations had been flouted; some exit doors had been locked to prevent unauthorized entry, and the elaborate palm tree décor contained flammable materials. The air conditioning system was filled with a flammable gas because of the wartime shortage of nonflammable Freon.

During the first Thanksgiving weekend since the U.S. had entered World War II, the Grove was filled to more than twice its legal capacity. The initial source of ignition is not definitely known, but the fire was accelerated by methyl chloride venting from the air conditioning unit. Flames and smoke spread rapidly through all areas of the club, and people could not escape quickly because of the locked exit doors. Blame was directed at Welansky for violation of standards; he served nearly four years in jail before being released just weeks before his death.

Local hospitals were especially well-prepared to treat the casualties, having been rehearsing emergency drills in response to possible wartime attacks on the East Coast. The crisis demonstrated the value of the recently-installed blood banks, and stimulated important advances in the treatment of burn victims. Following the fire, many new laws were enacted for public establishments, including the banning of flammable decorations, a provision that emergency exits must be kept unlocked (from the inside), and that revolving doors cannot be the only exit.

== Club ==
The Cocoanut Grove opened as a partnership between orchestra leaders Mickey Alpert and Jacques Renard in 1927 during Prohibition at 17 Piedmont Street in the Bay Village neighborhood of Boston, spanning from Piedmont Street to Shawmut Street. It became a speakeasy as Alpert and Renard's Mafia-connected financiers gained control, and the club had a reputation as a gangland hangout. Although neither Alpert nor Renard held an interest in the club by 1942, Alpert was leading the house band on the night of the fire.

Gangland boss and bootlegger Charles "King" Solomon, also known as "Boston Charlie", owned the club from 1931 until he was gunned down in the men's room of Roxbury's Cotton Club nightclub in 1933. Ownership passed to his lawyer Barnet "Barney" Welansky, who sought a more mainstream image for the club, while privately boasting of his ties to the mob and Boston Mayor Maurice J. Tobin. Welansky was known to be a tough boss who ran a tight ship, hiring teenagers as busboys for low wages and street toughs to double as waiters and bouncers. He locked exits, concealed others with draperies, and even bricked up one emergency exit to prevent customers from leaving without paying.

Originally a garage and warehouse complex, the brick and concrete buildings that constituted the Cocoanut Grove had been converted to a one-and-a-half-story meandering complex of dining rooms, bars, and lounges. A lounge in an adjoining building had opened the week before the fire. The club offered its patrons dining and dancing in a South Seas-like "tropical paradise" with a roof that could be rolled back in summer for dancing under the stars. The decor consisted of leatherette, rattan and bamboo coverings on the walls, heavy draperies, and dark blue satin canopies and covering on ceilings. Support columns in the main dining area were made to look like palm trees, with light fixtures made to look like coconuts. The theme was continued in the basement Melody Lounge, with what little light there was provided by palm tree light fixtures.

== Background ==
The "Grove" had become one of Boston's most popular nightspots, featuring a restaurant and dancing in the main area, floor shows, and piano-playing entertainers in the Melody Lounge. Visiting movie stars and singers would have their entry announced by the maître d'. The "Caricature Bar" featured renditions of prominent guests. The club had expanded eastward with the newly completed Broadway Lounge, which opened onto adjacent Broadway between Piedmont and Shawmut Streets.

Wall coverings and decorative materials had been approved on the basis of tests for ordinary ignition, which showed resistance to combustion from sources such as matches and cigarettes. Decorative cloth was purportedly treated with fire retardant ammonium sulfate upon installation, but there was no documentation that the treatment was maintained at the required intervals. The air-conditioning freon refrigerant had been replaced with the flammable gas methyl chloride because of a wartime shortage.

On the day of the fire College of the Holy Cross football team beat Boston College, causing the Boston College celebration party scheduled for the Cocoanut Grove that evening to be canceled. Mayor Tobin, a Boston College fan, also canceled his plans to go to the Grove. Female impersonator Arthur Blake was a headlining act that night. It is estimated that more than 1,000 people were crammed into the space rated for a maximum of 460. On the night of the fire, Welansky was recovering from a heart attack at Massachusetts General Hospital.

== Fire ==
Smoke rises from the Cocoanut Grove

Official reports state that the fire started around 10:15 pm in the Melody Lounge. Goody Goodelle, a young pianist and singer, was performing on a revolving stage surrounded by artificial palm trees. The lounge was lit by low-powered light bulbs in coconut-styled sconces beneath the fronds. A young man, possibly a soldier, had unscrewed a light bulb to give himself and his date privacy while kissing. Stanley Tomaszewski, a 16-year-old busboy, was instructed to put the light back on by tightening the bulb. He stepped up onto a chair to reach the light in the darkened corner. Unable to see the bulb, he lit a match to illuminate the area, tightened the bulb, and extinguished the match. Immediately afterward, witnesses first saw flames in the fronds, which were just below the ceiling. Though the lit match had been close to the fronds where the fire was seen to begin, the official report determined that Tomaszewski's actions could not be found to be the source of the fire, which "will be entered into the records of this department as being of unknown origin."

Despite waiters' efforts to douse the fire with water, it spread along the fronds of the palm tree decoration. In a final desperate attempt to separate the burning fronds from the fabric-covered false ceiling, the decoration was pulled away from the corner, taking with it a triangular plywood panel at the ceiling level and opening the enclosed space above the false ceiling. The fire then spread to the false ceiling, which rapidly burned, showering patrons with sparks and burning shreds of fabric. Flames raced up the stairway to the main level, with embers landing on patrons fleeing up the stairs. A fireball burst through the front entryway and spread through the remaining club areas, through the adjacent Caricature Bar, down a corridor to the Broadway Lounge, and across the central restaurant and dance floor, as the orchestra was beginning its evening show. Flames raced faster than patrons could move, followed by thick clouds of smoke. Within five minutes, flames and smoke had spread to the entire nightclub. Some patrons were instantly overcome by smoke as they sat in their seats. Others crawled through the smoky darkness, trying to find exits, all but one of which were either not functioning or hidden in nonpublic areas.

Many patrons attempted to exit through the main entrance, the same way they had entered. The building's main entrance was a single revolving door, which was rendered useless as the crowd stampeded in panic. Bodies piled up behind both sides of the revolving door, jamming it until it broke. The oxygen-hungry fire then leaped through the breach, incinerating whoever was left alive in the pile. Firemen had to douse the flames to approach the door.

Other avenues of escape were similarly useless; side doors had been bolted shut to prevent people from leaving without paying. A plate-glass window, which could have been smashed for escape, was boarded up and unusable as an emergency exit. Other unlocked doors, like the ones in the Broadway Lounge, opened inwards, rendering them useless against the crush of people trying to escape. Fire officials later testified that had the doors swung outwards, at least 300 lives could have been spared.

From nearby bars, soldiers and sailors raced to assist. On the street, firefighters lugged out bodies and were treated for burned hands. As night deepened, the temperature dropped. Water on cobblestone pavements froze over, and hoses were fused to the ground. Newspaper trucks were appropriated as ambulances. Smoldering bodies, living and dead, were hosed in icy water. Some victims had breathed fumes so hot that when they inhaled cold air, as one firefighter put it, they dropped like stones.

Later, during the cleanup of the building, firefighters found several dead guests sitting in their seats with drinks in their hands. They had been overcome so quickly by fire and toxic smoke that they had not had time to move.

== Victims and escapees ==
Victims of the fire being tended to in the street

Boston newspapers were filled with lists of the dead and stories of narrow escapes. Well-known film actor Buck Jones was at the club that night, and his wife later explained that he had initially escaped and then gone back into the burning building to find his agent, producer Scott R. Dunlap of Monogram Pictures. However, Jones was discovered slumped under his table severely burned, so some doubted accounts of his escape. Although rushed to hospital, Jones died of his injuries two days later. Dunlap, who was hosting a party at the nightclub in honor of Jones, was seriously injured, but survived.

Staff at the Cocoanut Grove fared better in escaping than customers, owing to their familiarity with service areas, where the fire's effects were less severe than in the public areas, and which provided access to additional window and door exits. A double door opposite the public entryway to the main dining room was unlocked by wait staff and became the only functional outside exit from public areas. Although several members of the band died, including musical director Bernie Fazioli, most of them escaped backstage and through a service door that they rammed open. Alpert escaped out of a basement window and was credited with leading several people to safety. Bassist Jack Lesberg went on to play music with Louis Armstrong, Sarah Vaughan, Leonard Bernstein, and many others until shortly before his death in 2005.

Cashier Jeanette Lanzoni, entertainer Goody Goodelle, three bartenders, and other employees and patrons in the Melody Lounge escaped into the kitchen. Bartender Daniel Weiss survived by dousing a cloth napkin with a pitcher of water and breathing through it as he made his escape from the Melody Lounge. Those in the kitchen had escape routes through a window above a service bar and up a stairway to another window and a service door that was eventually rammed open. Five people survived by taking refuge in a walk-in refrigerator and a few more in an icebox. Rescuers reached the kitchen after about 10 minutes.

Coast Guardsman Clifford Johnson went back inside the building no fewer than four times in search of his date, who unbeknownst to him, had safely escaped. Johnson suffered extensive third-degree burns over 55% of his body, but survived the disaster, becoming the most severely burned person to survive his injuries to date. After 21 months in a hospital and several hundred operations, he married his nurse and returned to his home state of Missouri. Fourteen years later, he burned to death in a fiery automobile crash.

The Cocoanut Grove fire was the second-deadliest single-building fire in American history; only the 1903 Iroquois Theatre fire in Chicago had a higher death toll, of 602. The Grove fire occurred only two years after the Rhythm Club fire, which had killed 209. The last known survivor of the Cocoanut Grove fire, Robert L. Shumway, died on June 25, 2025, at the age of 101.

== Investigations ==
An official report revealed that the Cocoanut Grove had been inspected by a captain in the Boston Fire Department (BFD) just 10 days before the fire and declared safe. The Grove was found to have not obtained any licenses for operation for several years; no food handlers' permits and no liquor licenses had been issued. Stanley Tomaszewski, the busboy who had allegedly started the fire, was underaged and should not have been working there. Moreover, the recent remodeling of the Broadway Lounge had been done without building permits, using unlicensed contractors.

Tomaszewski testified at the inquiry and was exonerated, as he was not responsible for the flammable decorations or the Life Safety Code violations. He was nevertheless ostracized for much of his life because of the fire. Tomaszewski died in 1994.

The BFD investigated possible causes of ignition, the rapid spread of the fire, and the catastrophic loss of life. Its report reached no conclusion as to the initial cause of ignition, but attributed the rapid, gaseous spread of the fire to a buildup of carbon monoxide gas from oxygen-deprived combustion in the enclosed space above the false ceiling of the Melody Lounge. The gas exuded from enclosed spaces as its temperature rose and ignited rapidly as it mixed with oxygen above the entryway, up the stairway to the main floor, and along ceilings. The fire accelerated as the stairway created a thermal draft, and the high-temperature gas fire ignited pyroxylin (leatherette) wall and ceiling covering in the foyer, which in turn exuded flammable gas. The report also documented the fire safety code violations, flammable materials, and door designs that contributed to the large loss of life.

During the 1990s, former Boston firefighter and researcher Charles Kenney discovered that a highly flammable gas refrigerant, methyl chloride, had been used as a substitute for Freon, which was in short wartime supply. Kenney reported that floor plans, but not the fire investigation report, showed air-conditioning condenser units near street level on the other side of a nonstructural wall from the Melody Lounge, and that these units had been serviced since the start of the war (within the last 12 months). Kenney also reported that photographic evidence indicated an origin for the fire in the wall behind the palm tree and suggested ignition of methyl chloride accelerant by an electrical failure caused by substandard wiring. Methyl chloride combustion is consistent with some aspects of the fire (reported flame colors, smell, and inhalation symptoms), but requires additional explanation for ceiling-level fire, as the gas is 1.7 times as dense as air.

In 2012, the BFD released the transcripts of witness interviews following the fire. Witnesses Tomaszewski, Morris Levy, Joyce Spector, David Frechtling and Jeanette Lanzoni (Volume 1) provided accounts of the ignition of the palm decoration and ceiling in the Melody Lounge. Frechtling and Lanzoni described the start of the fire as a "flash." Tomaszewski described the spread of the fire across the ceiling as like a gasoline fire. The flame front across the ceiling was faint blue, followed by brighter flames. Witness Roland Sousa (Volume 2) stated that he was initially unconcerned about the fire because, as a regular customer of the Melody Lounge, he had seen the palm tree decorations ignite before and they were always quickly put out.

== Legal consequences ==
Barney Welansky, whose connections had allowed the nightclub to operate while in violation of the loose standards of the day, was convicted on 19 counts of manslaughter (19 victims were randomly selected to represent the dead). He was sentenced to 12–15 years in prison in 1943. Welansky served nearly four years before being quietly pardoned by Tobin, who had been elected governor of Massachusetts since the fire. In December 1946, ill with cancer, Welansky was released from Norfolk Prison and told reporters, "I wish I'd died with the others in the fire." He died nine weeks after his release.

In the year that followed the fire, Massachusetts and other states enacted laws for public establishments banning flammable decorations and inward-swinging exit doors, and requiring exit signs to be visible at all times (meaning that the exit signs had to have independent sources of electricity and be easily readable in even the thickest smoke). The new laws also required that revolving doors used for egress must either be flanked by at least one normal, outward-swinging door, or retrofitted to permit the individual door leaves to fold flat to permit free-flowing traffic in a panic situation, and further required that no emergency exits be chained or bolted shut in such a way as to bar escape through the doors during a panic or emergency situation. Jack Thomas of The Boston Globe wrote in his front-page 50th-anniversary article, "the Licensing Board ruled that no Boston establishment could call itself the Cocoanut Grove." No other Cocoanut Grove situation has occurred in Boston.

Commissions were established by several states that would levy heavy fines or even shut down establishments for infractions of these laws, which later became the basis for several federal fire laws and code restrictions for nightclubs, theaters, banks, public buildings, and restaurants across the nation. It also led to the formation of several national organizations dedicated to fire safety.

== Medical treatment ==
Massachusetts General Hospital (MGH) and Boston City Hospital (BCH) received most (83%) of the fire victims; other Boston area hospitals received about 30 patients: Peter Bent Brigham Hospital, Beth Israel Hospital, Cambridge City Hospital, Kenmore Hospital, Faulkner Hospital, St. Elizabeth's Hospital, Malden Hospital, Massachusetts Memorial Hospital, Carney Hospital, and St. Margaret's Hospital. MGH took 114 burn and smoke inhalation victims, and BCH received over 300. It is estimated that one casualty arrived at BCH every 11 seconds, the greatest influx of patients to any civilian hospital in history. Both hospitals were unusually well-prepared, as medical facilities along the Eastern Seaboard had drawn up emergency plans in preparation for attacks against the East Coast. Boston had carried out a city-wide drill only a week earlier, simulating a Luftwaffe bombing assault, with over 300 mock casualties. At MGH, a special store of emergency supplies had been stockpiled. The fire caught both hospitals at change of shift, so a double complement of nursing and support staff was available, in addition to volunteers who flocked to the hospitals as word spread of the disaster.

Nonetheless, most patients died en route to the hospitals or shortly after arrival. Because no standardized system for triage yet existed in civilian mass-casualty management in the U.S., precious minutes were initially wasted in attempts to revive those who were dead or dying, until teams were dispatched to select the living for treatment and direct the dead to be taken to temporary mortuaries. By Sunday morning, November 29, only 132 patients out of the 300 transported to BCH were still alive, whereas at MGH, 75 of the 114 victims had died, leaving 39 surviving patients in treatment. Of a total of 444 burn victims hospitalized after the fire, only 130 survived.

One of the first administrative decisions made at MGH was to clear the general surgery ward on the sixth floor of the White Building and devote it entirely to victims of the fire. All victims were housed there; strict medical isolation was maintained, and a part of the ward was set aside for dressing changes and wound care. Teams of nurses and orderlies were organized for administration of morphine, wound care, and respiratory treatments. MGH staff went onto Charles Street and stopped passing cars to recruit blood donors.

Prior to the fire, in April 1942, MGH had established one of the area's first blood banks, and had stocked it with 200 units of dried plasma as part of preparations for the war. In total, 147 units of plasma were used in treating 29 patients at MGH. At BCH, where the Office of Civilian Defense had stored 500 units of plasma for wartime use, 98 patients received a total of 693 units of plasma, which included plasma donated by Peter Bent Brigham Hospital, the United States Navy, and the American Red Cross. The volume of plasma used in treating victims of the fire surpassed that used during the attack on Pearl Harbor. In the days following the fire, 1,200 people donated over 3,800 units of blood to the blood bank.

Most survivors were discharged by the end of 1942, but a few patients required months of intensive care. In April 1943, the last survivor from MGH was discharged. At BCH, the last casualty, a woman from Dorchester, died in May after five months of treatment for severe burns and internal injuries. Hospitals rendering service chose not to charge any of the patients for treatment. The Red Cross provided financial aid to both public and private hospitals. This was especially helpful to BCH, given its enormous influx of patients.

=== Advances in the care of burn victims ===
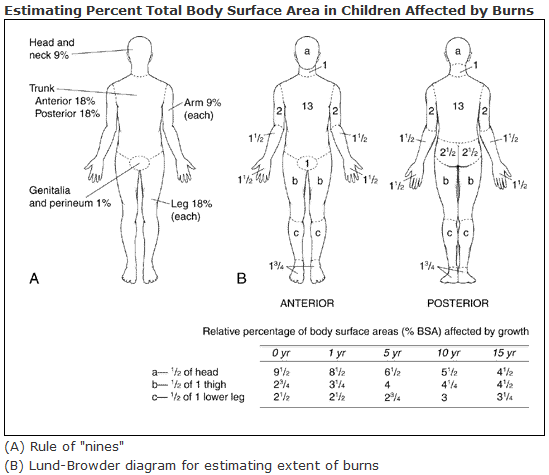
The Lund and Browder chart first published in 1944 was based on experience treating victims of the Cocoanut Grove fire.

The fire led to new ways of caring for both burns and smoke inhalation. The team at BCH was directed by Dr. Charles Lund as senior surgeon and Dr. Newton Browder. In 1944, Lund and Browder, drawing upon their experiences in treating Cocoanut Grove victims, published the most widely cited paper in modern burn care, "Estimation of the Areas of Burns", in which a diagram for estimating burn size was presented. This diagram, called the Lund and Browder chart, remains in use throughout the world today.

==== Fluid therapy ====
Surgeons Francis Daniels Moore and Oliver Cope at MGH pioneered fluid resuscitation techniques for the burn victims, noting that the majority of patients suffered from severe hemorrhagic tracheobronchitis because of "prolonged inhalation of the very hot air and fumes, which presumably contained many toxic products...and, in addition, numerous hot particles of fine carbon or similar substances." At the time, infusions of saline alone were thought to "wash out" plasma proteins and increase the risk of pulmonary edema. Accordingly, patients at MGH were given a solution of equal parts of plasma and saline solution, based on the extent of their cutaneous burns, while at BCH, patients with respiratory injuries were given fluids as needed.

Careful evaluations showed no evidence of pulmonary edema, and Finland's studies at BCH concluded, "the fluids seemed to produce obvious improvement in most instances without any apparent adverse effect on the respiratory system." This experience stimulated further studies of burn shock, leading to a 1947 publication by Cope and Moore of the first comprehensive formula for fluid therapy based on a calculation of the total surface area of burn wounds and the volume of urine and liquids that had been wrung out of patients’ bedsheets.

==== Burn care ====
The standard surface burn treatment in use at the time was the so-called "tanning process" involving the application of a solution of tannic acid, which created a leathery scab over the wound that protected against the invasion of bacteria and prevented the loss of bodily fluids. This was a time-consuming process that subjected the patient to agonizing pain because of the scrubbing procedure required before the application of the chemical dyes.

At MGH, burns were treated with a new technique pioneered by Cope and refined by Bradford Cannon: Soft gauze covered with petroleum jelly and boric acid ointment. Patients were kept on a closed ward, and meticulous sterile technique was used in all patient-care activities. A month later at BCH, 40 of the initial 132 survivors had died, mostly from complications from their burns; at MGH, none of the 39 initial survivors died from their burns (seven died from other causes). As a result, the use of tannic acid as a treatment for burns was phased out as the standard.

==== Antibiotics ====
At MGH, intravenous sulfadiazine (a drug which had only been approved for use in the U.S. in 1941) was given to all patients as part of their initial treatment. At BCH, 76 patients received sulfonamides for an average of 11 days. Thirteen survivors of the fire were also among the first humans to be treated with penicillin. In early December, Merck and Company rushed a 32-liter supply of the drug, in the form of culture liquid in which the Penicillium mold had been grown, to Boston. These patients received 5,000 IU (roughly 2.99 mg) every four hours, a small dose by today's standards, but at the time antibiotic resistance was rare, and most strains of Staphylococcus aureus were penicillin-sensitive. The drug was crucial in preventing infections in skin grafts. According to the British Medical Journal:

Though bacteriological studies showed that most of the burns were infected, the second-degree burns healed without clinical evidence of infection and with minimal scarring. The deep burns remained unusually free of invasive infection.

Penicillin's success in treating Cocoanut Grove victims helped convince the U.S. government that penicillin should be produced in quantity for use by the armed forces.

==== Psychological trauma ====
Erich Lindemann, an MGH psychiatrist, studied the survivors of the dead and published what has become a classic paper, "Symptomatology and Management of Acute Grief", read at the Centenary Meeting of the American Psychiatric Association in 1944.

At the same time Lindemann was laying the foundation for the study of grief and dysfunctional grieving, Alexandra Adler conducted psychiatric observations and questionnaires over 11 months with more than 500 survivors of the fire, publishing some of the earliest research on post-traumatic stress disorder. More than half of the survivors exhibited symptoms of general nervousness and anxiety, which lasted at least three months. Survivors who lost consciousness for a short time during the incident exhibited the most post-traumatic mental complications. Adler noted that 54% of survivors treated at BCH and 44% of those at MGH exhibited "post-traumatic neuroses", and that a majority of the survivors' friends and family members showed signs of "emotional upset that attained proportions of a major psychiatric condition and needed trained intervention." Adler also discovered one survivor with a lasting brain lesion who presented symptoms of visual agnosia, most likely caused by exposure to carbon monoxide fumes, other noxious gases and/or a lack of sufficient oxygen.

== Memorials and former site ==
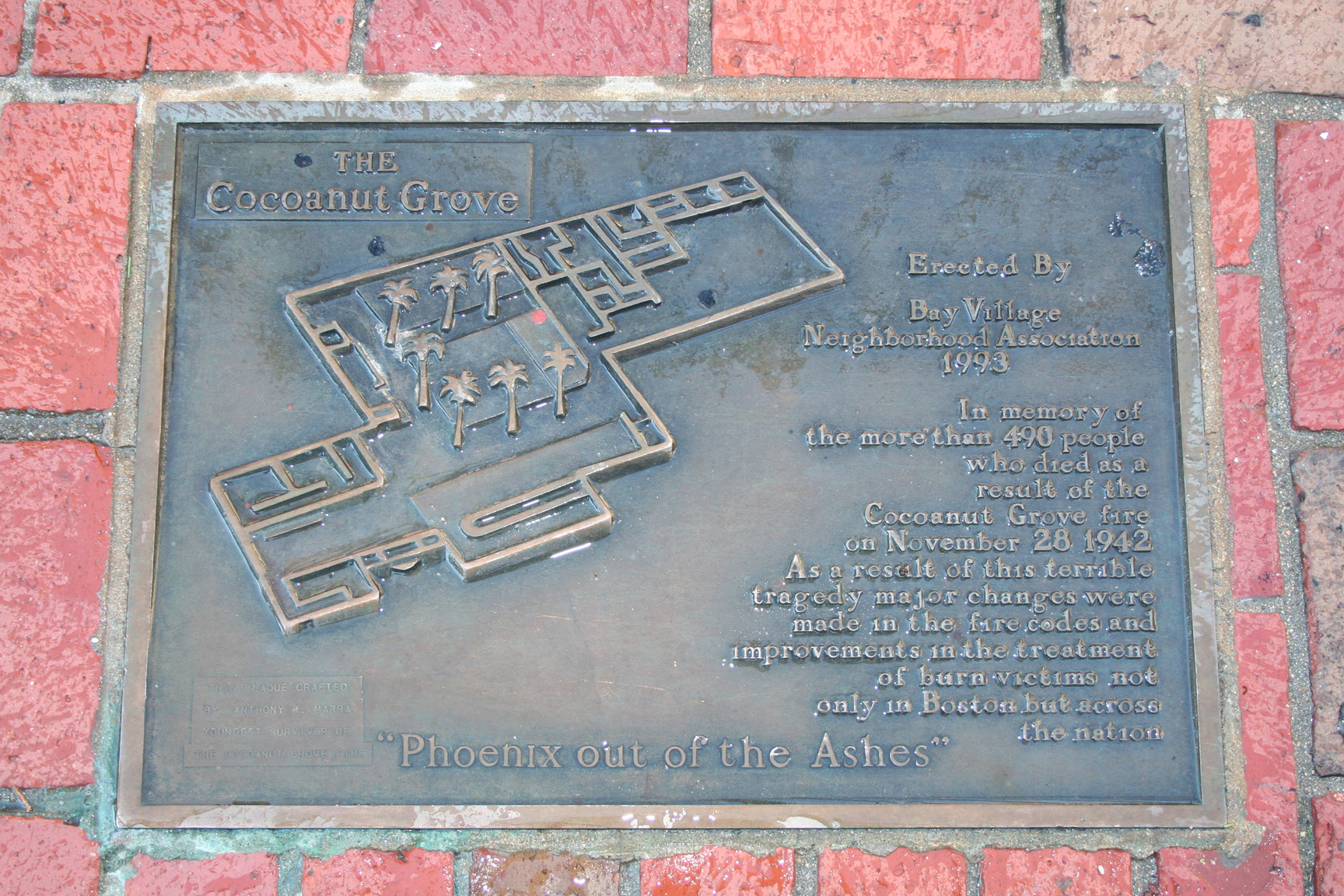
Memorial plaque in the sidewalk near the site of the fire

After the ruins of the Cocoanut Grove complex were torn down in 1944, the street map of the neighborhood was changed by urban renewal, with several nearby streets being renamed or built over. The nightclub address had been 17 Piedmont Street, in the Bay Village neighborhood near downtown Boston. For decades after the fire, this location was used as a parking lot.

Much of the club's former footprint, including what was the main entrance, now lies under the Revere Hotel; only a portion of the club extended out to Shawmut Street. The surviving section of Shawmut Street, and a newer extension cutting through what was the club's original footprint, formerly known as Shawmut Street Extension, were renamed Cocoanut Grove Lane in 2013. In 2015, several condominium residences were constructed on the site and designated as 25 Piedmont Street.

In 1993, the Bay Village Neighborhood Association installed a memorial plaque in the sidewalk—crafted by Anthony P. Marra, youngest survivor of the Cocoanut Grove fire—next to the location where the club formerly stood:

In memory of the more than 490 people who died in the Cocoanut Grove fire on November 28, 1942. As a result of that terrible tragedy, major changes were made in the fire codes, and improvements in the treatment of burn victims, not only in Boston but across the nation. "Phoenix out of the Ashes"

The plaque has been moved several times, triggering a long-running dispute over its location.

In October 2015, the Cocoanut Grove Memorial Committee was formed to build a more substantial memorial. In addition, the Committee set up a memorial website which offers historical documentation and editorial commentary related to the disaster and its consequences. The website documents the total death toll as 490, with a detailed capsule biography of each.

In 2017 a documentary film Six Locked Doors: The Legacy of Cocoanut Grove was released. The film told the history of the nightclub before, during, and after the catastrophic fire, and featured interviews with some survivors who had lived into the 21st century. The documentary was later expanded and updated for a new release in 2026.

On November 26, 2023, a groundbreaking ceremony was held in Boston's Statler Park, one block north of the disaster site, for an 18-by-11-foot (5.5 m × 3.4 m) memorial consisting of three 11-foot (3.4 m) arches echoing the original entrance of the nightclub, where many died trying to escape the fire. The memorial will be constructed with 490 granite bricks, each with a victim's name inscribed. It was originally planned to be completed by September 2024, though the date was later pushed until September or October 2025, and as of December 2025 it was still listed as being in the "design" or "fabrication" stage, with no definite date for the construction or completion of the project.

== See also ==
- List of disasters in Massachusetts by death toll

Circumstances of the following fires have strong similarities to the Cocoanut Grove nightclub fire:

- Beverly Hills Supper Club fire (1977)
- Club Cinq-Sept fire (1970)
- Crans-Montana bar fire (2026)
- Ghost Ship fire (2016)
- Kiss nightclub fire (2013)
- Lame Horse fire (2009)
- Laurier Palace Theatre fire (1927)
- Stardust fire (1981)
- The Station nightclub fire (2003)
- UpStairs Lounge arson attack (1973)
- Wuwang Club fire (2008)
