= Parkland High School =

Parkland High School or Parklands High School may refer to one of the following secondary schools:

- Parkland High School (Pennsylvania), Allentown, Pennsylvania
- Parkland High School (Texas), El Paso, Texas
- Parkland Magnet High School, Winston-Salem, North Carolina
- Parklands High School (Lancashire), Chorley, Lancashire
- Parklands High School, Liverpool, Speke, Liverpool, Mereyside
- Parklands High School (West Yorkshire), a former secondary school in Seacroft, Leeds, West Yorkshire
- Parklands High School (Burnie), a secondary school located on the North West Coast of Tasmania, Australia
- Parklands High School, Alberton, a secondary school located in Gauteng, South Africa.

== See also ==
- Parkland (disambiguation)
- Marjory Stoneman Douglas High School, Parkland, Florida
  - Parkland high school shooting, in 2018, which resulted in the deaths of 17 people, and injuries of 17 others
- Parkland Secondary School, North Saanich, Vancouver Island, British Columbia, Canada
- Parkland Secondary (Sidney, British Columbia)
- Parkland Middle School, Montgomery County, Maryland, USA
