= Charles R. Baxter =

American medical doctor

Charles Rufus Baxter, MD (November 4, 1929 – March 10, 2005) was an American doctor. Baxter was one of the surgeons who unsuccessfully tried to save U.S. President John F. Kennedy after his 1963 assassination in Dallas, Texas. He is also remembered for the Parkland formula, which gives an indication of how much fluid should be given to a patient with burn injuries.

== Biography ==
Born in Paris, Texas, Baxter graduated from the University of Texas at Austin in 1950. He then attended the University of Texas Southwestern Medical Center in Dallas where he received his medical degree in 1954.

Baxter was the emergency department director at Parkland Memorial Hospital when Kennedy was shot, and famously said of the event in 1988:

As soon as we realized we had nothing medical to do, we all backed off from the man with a reverence that one has for one's president, and we did not continue to be doctors from that point on. We became citizens again, and there were probably more tears shed in that room than in the surrounding hundred miles.

He also operated on Texas Governor John Connally, who had been wounded in the attack.

Baxter made advances in the treatment of burn victims, and founded the burn unit and a skin-graft bank at Parkland. The Parkland formula for fluids is attributed to him.

He died at Zale-Lipshy Hospital in Dallas, Texas, on March 10, 2005, of pneumonia, aged 75.

== See also ==
- Parkland formula
- Parkland Memorial Hospital
