= Children's Health =

Children's Health may refer to:

- Children's Health, a magazine formerly published by Rodale, Inc.
- Children's Health (health care system), a pediatric health care system run by Children's Medical Center Dallas and Children's Medical Center Plano
