= Baux score =

Score used to predict mortality in burn patients

- Purpose: determine mortality due to burns

The Baux score is a system used to predict the chance of mortality due to burns. The score is an index which takes into account the correlative and causal relationship between mortality and factors including advancing age, burn size, the presence of inhalational injury. Studies have shown that the Baux score is highly correlative with length of stay in hospital due to burns and final outcome.

== Methods ==
=== Original method ===
The original Baux score was the addition of two factors, the first being the total body surface area affected by burning (usually estimated using the Wallace rule of nines, or calculated using a Lund and Browder chart) and the second being the age of the patient.

The score is determined by the calculation:

Baux score = (percent body surface burned) + (patient's age)

The score is a comparative indicator of burn severity, with a score over 140 considered unsurvivable, depending on the available treatment resources.

=== Modified method ===
Research demonstrated that improvements in medical care rendered the original method too pessimistic in its outcome prediction. This resulted in the publication of a modified methodology which took into account the effect of inhalation injury. It was found that inhalation injury resulted in an increase of around 17 on the Baux score, and this addition means that a patient with inhalation injury would have their score calculated by body area affected + age of patient + 17.

Recent analysis of mortality in burn units worldwide has shown that for well performing units the LD_{50} (the point at which 50% of patients would be expected to die) for major burns has significantly improved and the best units have a modified Baux score of 130-140. This means that all burns in children (except 100% TBSA full-thickness burns) should be considered survivable injuries and actively treated.

== Efficacy ==
Studies have shown Baux score to be effective in measuring comparative severity of burn injuries, and in predicting the prognosis for the patient. The modified version, which includes inhalation injuries, is more accurate than the original method, although neither method is as accurate as more complex calculated scores using advanced computer modelling.

The Baux score has been shown to be effective in predicting outcome in 87% of presenting patients aged 60 and above.
