= Harold H. Velde =

Politician from Illinois (1910–1985)

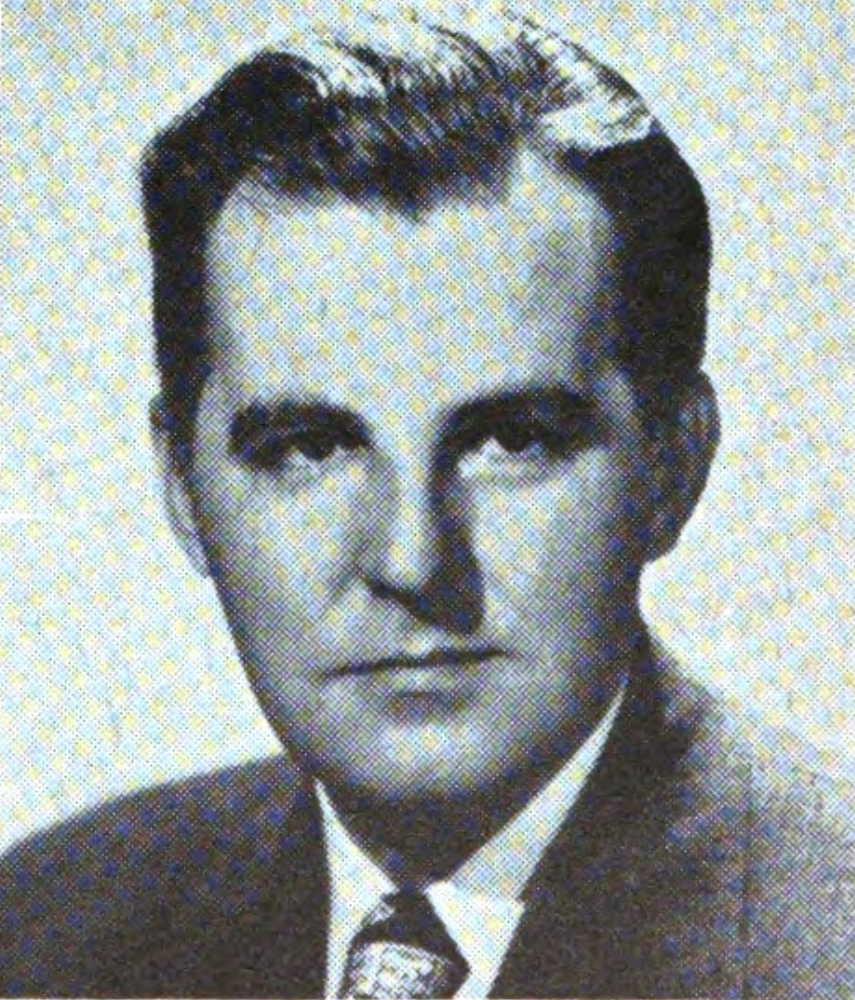

Member of the U.S. House of Representatives from Illinois's 18th district
- In office January 3, 1949 – January 3, 1957
- Preceded by: Everett M. Dirksen
- Succeeded by: Robert H. Michel

Personal details
- Born: Harold Himmel Velde; April 1, 1910 Parkland, Illinois, US
- Died: September 1, 1985 (aged 75) Sun City, Arizona, US
- Party: Republican
- Education: Bradley University; Northwestern University; University of Illinois College of Law at Urbana-Champaign

Harold Himmel Velde (April 1, 1910 – September 1, 1985) was a Republican American political figure from Illinois. While United States Congressman for Illinois's 18th congressional district he was chairman of the House Un-American Activities Committee between 1953 and 1955.

== Background ==
Velde was born on a farm near Parkland, Illinois. After attending rural grade and high school, he attended Bradley University from 1927 to 1929, then graduated from Northwestern University in 1931 and from University of Illinois Law School in 1937.

== Career ==
Velde was admitted to the bar as a lawyer, taking up practice in Pekin, Illinois.

Velde served as a private in the United States Army Signal Corps in 1942 until becoming a special agent for the FBI's sabotage and counterespionage division in 1943, staying there until 1946.

In 1946, he was then elected judge for Tazewell County, Illinois and remained judge until 1949.

In 1948, Velde won election to the United States House of Representatives, taking his seat on January 3, 1949.

In the 83rd United States Congress, he became chairman of the House Un-American Activities Committee after the previous chairman, J. Parnell Thomas of New Jersey, went to prison for taking kickbacks.

Velde did not run in 1956, and ended his four terms in Congress on January 3, 1957.

After Congress, Velde returned to practicing law: He was a lawyer in Urbana, Illinois and Washington, D.C. until May 5, 1969. He became a regional counsel for the General Services Administration in Lansing, Illinois in 1969.

== Personal and death ==
In 1974, he retired to Sun City, Arizona, where he died on September 1, 1985. His ashes were interred in Pekin, Illinois.

== See also ==
- List of members of the House Un-American Activities Committee

U.S. House of Representatives
| Preceded by Edward H. Jenison | U.S. Representative of Illinois's 18th congressional district 1949-1957 | Succeeded by Robert H. Michel |
