= Children's Medical Center Dallas =

Hospital in Dallas, Texas, US

Coordinates: 32.8094°N 96.8365°W

- Children's Health

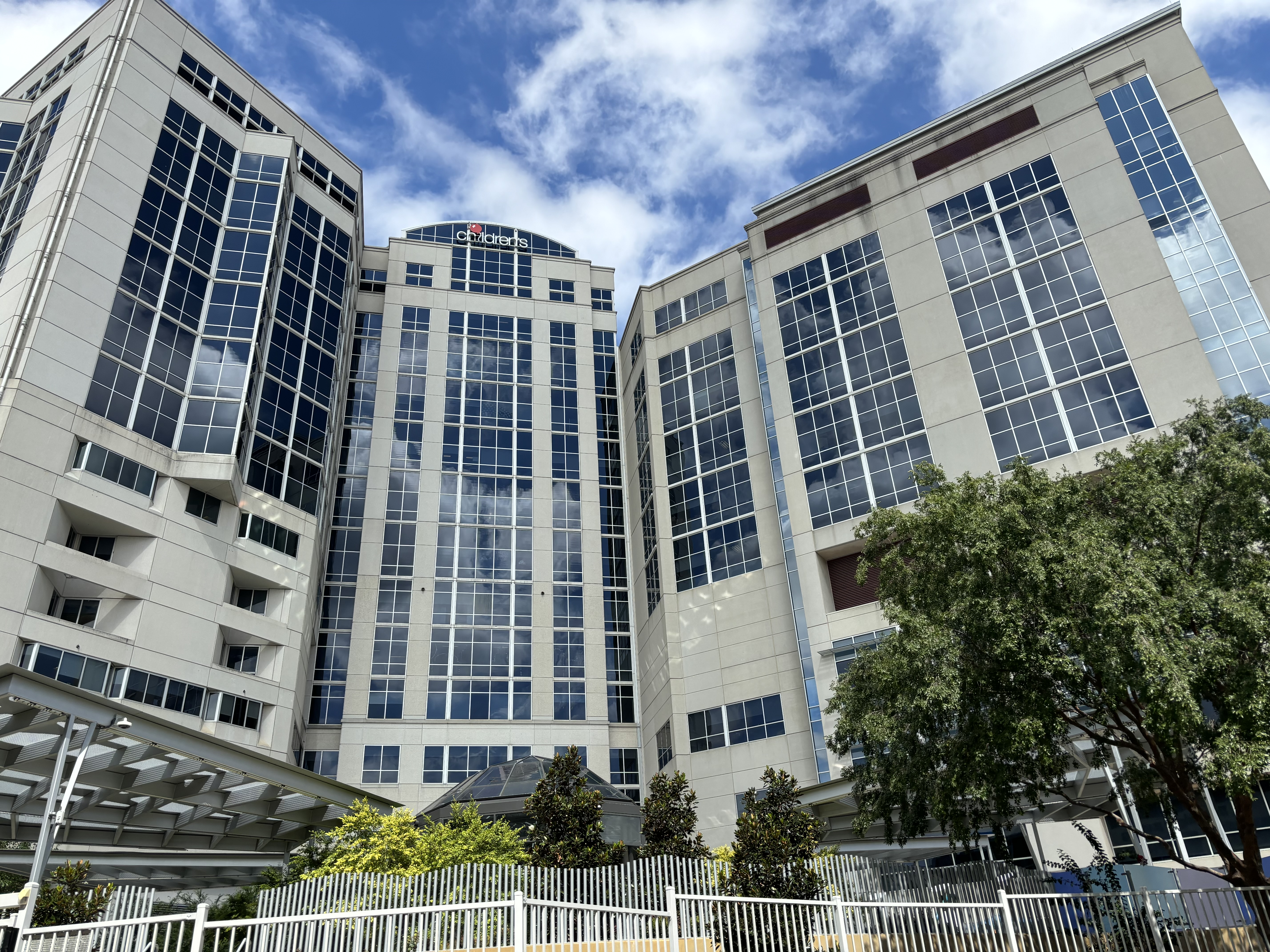

Organisation
- Type: Children's hospital
- Affiliated university: University of Texas Southwestern Medical School

Services
- Emergency department: Level 1 Pediatric Trauma Center
- Beds: 496

Helipads
- Helipad: Yes

History
- Former name: Texas Children's Hospital
- Founded: 1913

Links
- Website: https://www.childrens.com

Children's Medical Center Dallas is the flagship facility of Children's Health, a nationally ranked pediatric acute care teaching hospital located in Southwestern Medical District, Dallas, Texas, US. The hospital has 496 pediatric beds and is affiliated with the University of Texas Southwestern Medical School. It provides comprehensive pediatric specialties and subspecialties to infants, children, teens and young adults aged 0–21 throughout Texas and surrounding regions. It sometimes treats adults who require pediatric care as well. It has an ACS designated level 1 pediatric trauma center, one of five in Texas. The hospital also has affiliations with the adjacent Parkland Memorial Hospital.

Children's Medical Center Dallas is the main hospital campus of Children's Health, the only academic healthcare system in Dallas-Fort Worth dedicated solely to the comprehensive care of children from birth to age 21. Children's Health started with just the Dallas location, but has grown to include Children's Medical Center Plano as well as several other pediatric specialty, primary care and urgent care centers located throughout North Texas. It is one of the largest pediatric hospitals in the US.

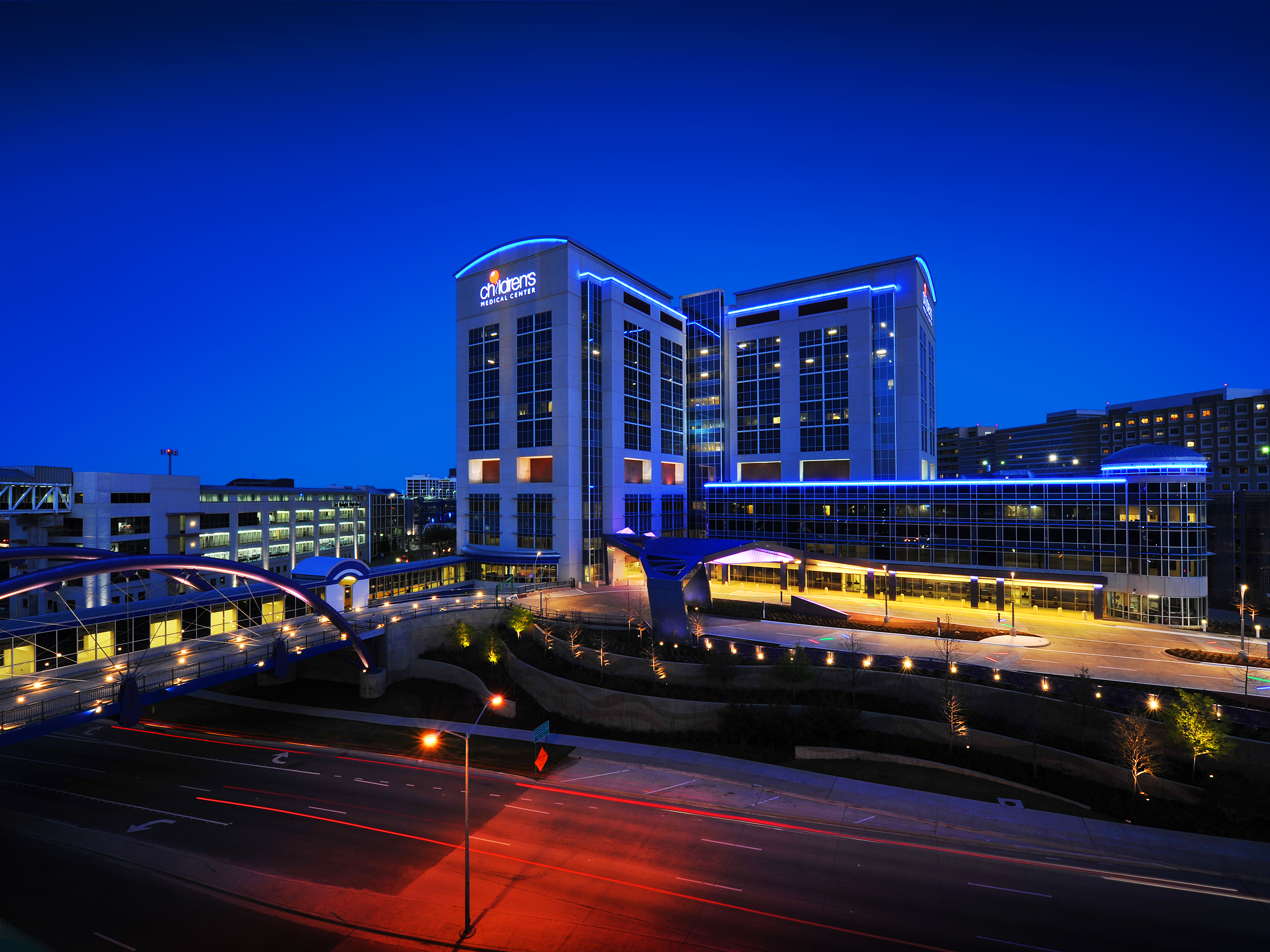
Children's Medical Center Dallas at night.

== History ==
Children's Medical Center Dallas traces its origins to summer 1913, when a group of nurses organized an open-air clinic on the lawn of the old Parkland Hospital in Dallas. The original clinic was known as the Dallas Baby Camp and treated infants up to age 3.

The nurses decided that children received better care when it was focused only on them. In 1930, the Dallas Baby Camp grew into the Bradford Hospital for Babies, which merged with Children's Hospital of Texas and Richmond Freeman Memorial Clinic in 1948 to form what is now known as Children's Medical Center of Dallas.

It has been affiliated with UT Southwestern Medical Center since 1964.

In 1967, administrative structures strengthened and the new campus was opened at its current location.

In 2014, it expanded into Children's Health, a system dedicated to providing all types of care for children, as well as public education about health and wellness, across its several hospitals, specialty centers and pediatric clinics throughout North Texas.

== Location and features ==
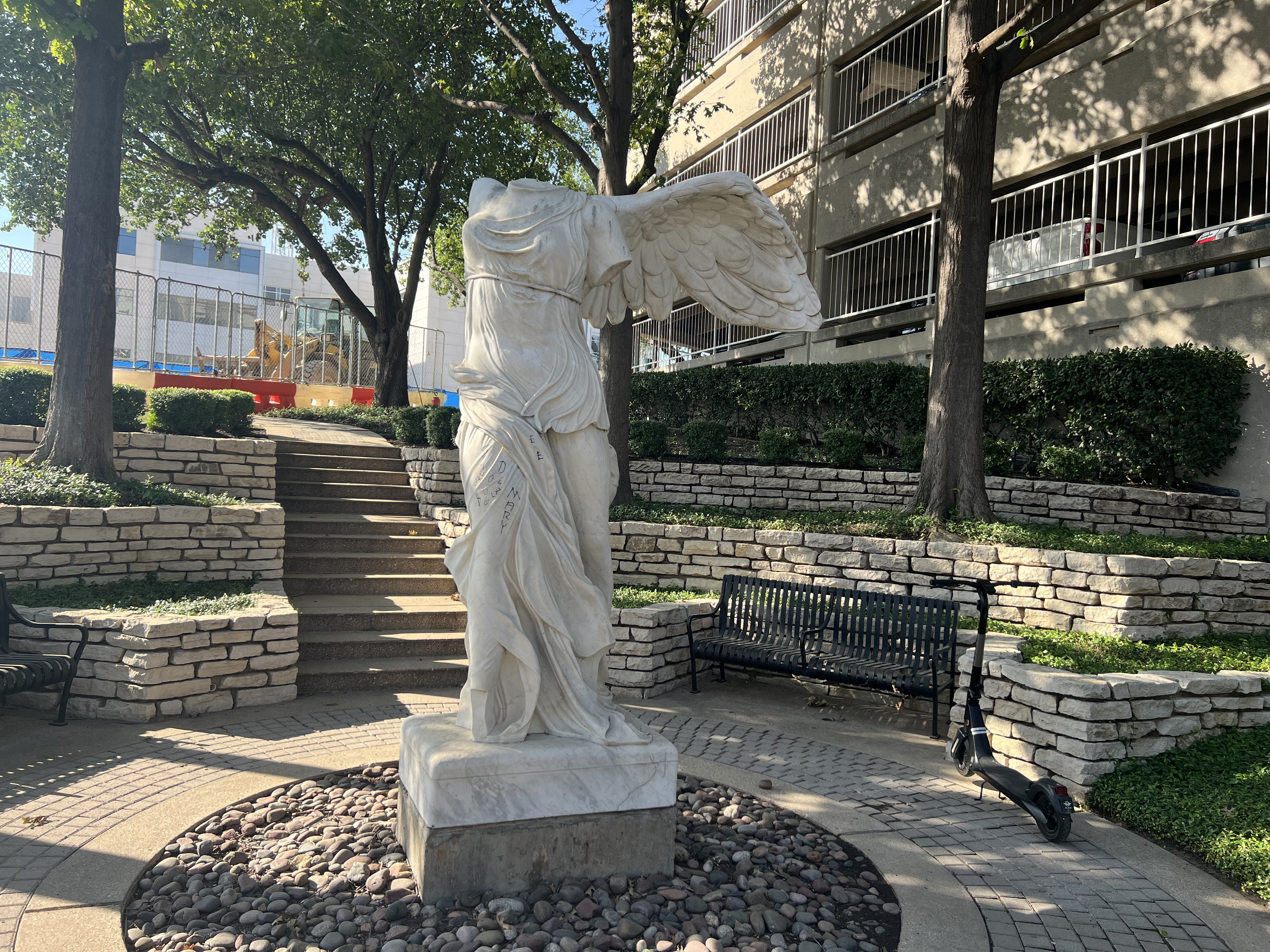
A replica of Nike of Samothrace sits on the south side of the CMCD campus.

Located at 1935 Medical District Drive in the Southwestern Medical District of Dallas, the hospital is licensed for 490 beds and recorded more than 460,000 patient encounters in 2018. It has 16 operating rooms, a 47-bed level 4 neonatal intensive care unit and offers expertise in more than 50 pediatric specialties and the highest level of trauma care in North Texas as a pediatric level I trauma center.

Since 2024, the hospital has been undergoing a $5 billion expansion, which will move the main building on to campus and adjacent to Clements University Hospital at UT Southwestern in 2031, increasing size and capacity to meet the needs of the rapidly growing population of the DFW metroplex.

The hospital is served by the Trinity Railway Express at Medical/Market Center Station and the Southwestern Medical District/Parkland station of DART light rail.

== Rankings and recognition ==
Children's Medical Center Dallas was ranked 48th in the world among pediatric specialized hospitals in 2024 by Newsweek.

The U.S. News & World Report also consistently names the hospital among the best in the United States every year, namely in the most recent list of the top pediatric hospitals in the US. In the 2023-2024 edition of "Best Children's Hospitals", it was ranked in all ten specialties listed below:

U.S. News & World Report Rankings for Children's
Specialty	Rank (in the U.S.)	Score (out of 100)
Neonatology	#36	77.2
Pediatric Cancer	#15	80.9
Pediatric Cardiology & Heart Surgery	#35	73.8
Pediatric Diabetes & Endocrinology	#14	73.4
Pediatric Gastroenterology & GI Surgery	#15	86.6
Pediatric Nephrology	#16	81.6
Pediatric Neurology & Neurosurgery	#15	84.9
Pediatric Orthopedics	#4	96.2
Pediatric Pulmonology & Lung Surgery	#22	65.0
Pediatric Urology	#15	83.4
