= Children's Medical Center Plano =

Coordinates: 33.0784°N 96.8011°W

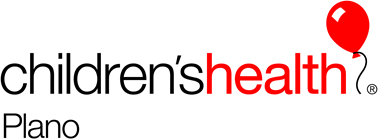

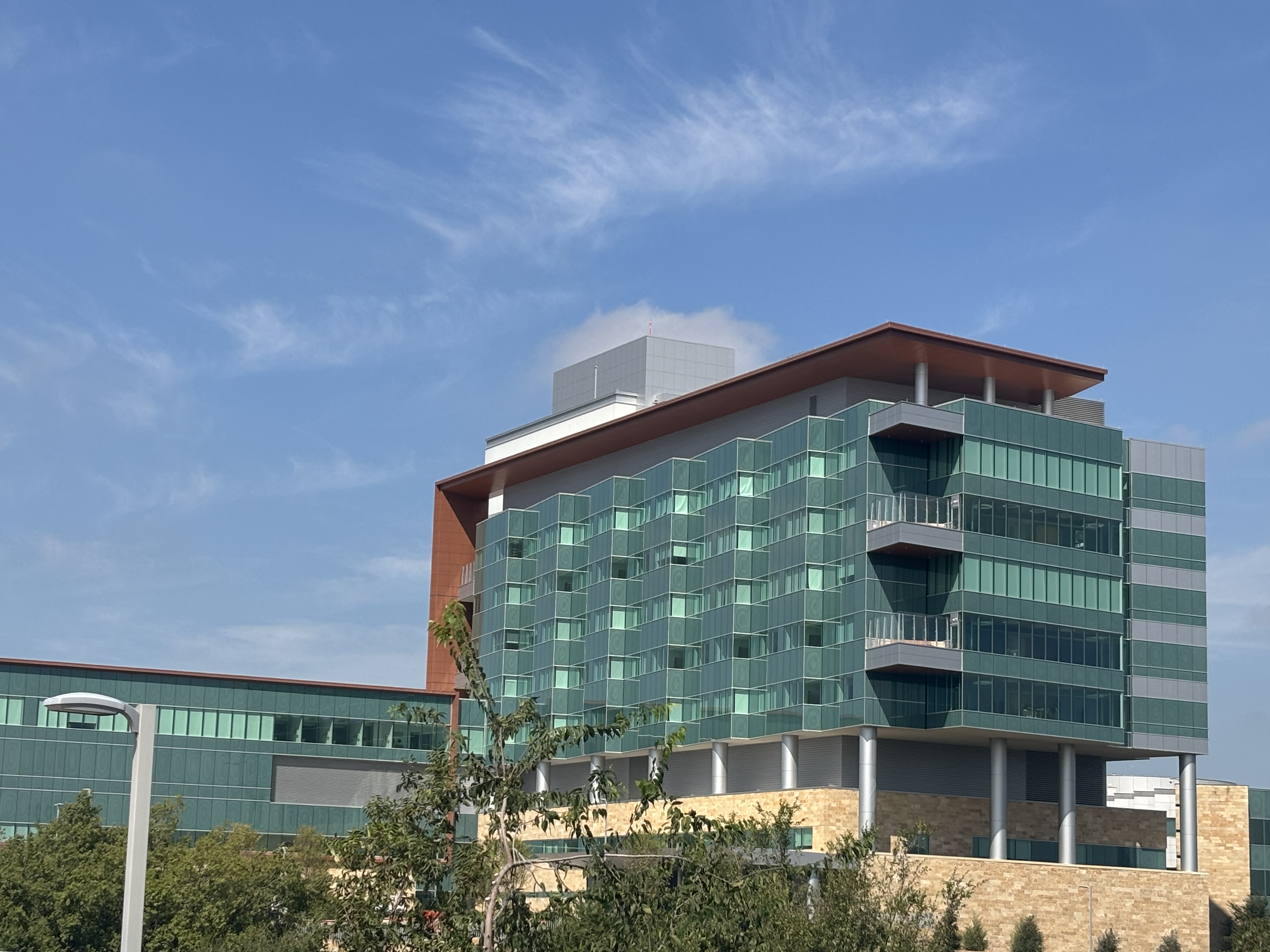

Geography
- Location: Plano, Texas, United States

Organization
- Affiliated university: University of Texas Southwestern Medical School

Services
- Beds: 72

History
- Founded: 2008

Links
- Website: Children's Medical Center Plano
- Lists: Hospitals in Texas

Children's Medical Center Plano is a children's hospital located in Plano, Texas, USA. It provides pediatric healthcare for children from birth to age 21. As a branch of the Children's Health system, it offers care to families across north Texas and beyond in more than 25 specialties. The medical staff includes specialists from UT Southwestern. The center recorded more than 140,000 patient encounters in 2014. The center, which is attached to the main hospital, offers the largest suburban group of pediatric specialists in the US.

The Children's Health System also includes Children's Medical Center Dallas, as well as multiple specialty centers, primary and urgent care offices located throughout north Texas.

== About ==
Located at 7601 Preston Road in Plano, the center sits on a 155-acre (63 ha) site with "green space" preserved to provide an environment for patients and families. The hospital currently has 72 beds with an infrastructure for 240 beds, eight operating rooms, four procedure rooms, 24-7 emergency services and laboratory, pharmacy and imaging services. Completed in 2008, it has a family resource library where patients and families have access to print and digital consumer health information, children's literature and personalized research assistance. In addition to translation, pastoral care and guest relations services, families also have access to the specially trained child life specialists and playrooms designed just for children.

In early 2020, it was announced that the center would undergo an expansion to construct a new patient tower. The tower would increase the bed count to 240 and add 300,000 square feet. The project is expected to be complete by 2023.

== Industry recognition ==
In 2014, for the fourth consecutive year, the center was ranked first among Children's Hospital Association peers in first case, on-time starts. In addition, the Leapfrog Group included it on its list of Top Hospitals in 2014, one of nine children's hospitals in the US and one of only two in Texas, recognizing the facility's excellence in quality and patient safety.

== Specialties ==
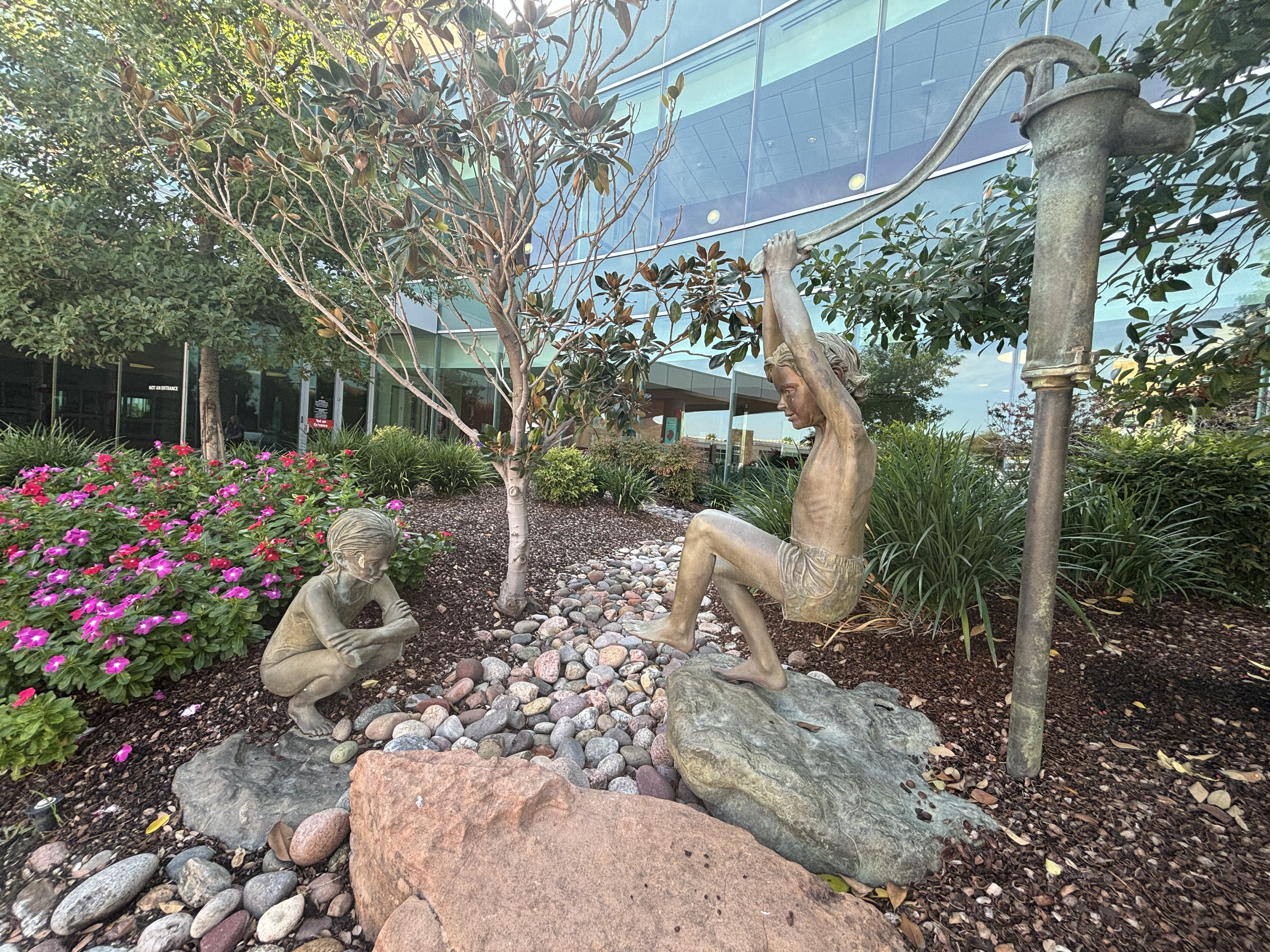

- Allergy
- Audiology
- Autism and developmental disabilities
- Cancer and blood disorders
- Cardiac consultation
- Orthopedics and sports medicine
- Clinical nutrition
- Cystic fibrosis
- Diabetes program
- Ear, nose and throat (ENT)
- Eating disorder services
- Endocrinology
- Epilepsy center
- Foster care
- Gastroenterology
- Gynecology
- Heart center (cardiology)
- Hematology (blood disorders)
- Imaging and radiology (X-ray)
- Nephrology
- Neurodevelopmental delay
- Neurology
- Oncology (cancer)
- Ophthalmology (Eeye)
- Physical medicine and rehabilitation therapy
- Plastic and craniofacial surgery
- Pulmonology
- Sleep
- Urology
