= Lund and Browder chart =

Chart used to determine the area affected by burn injuries

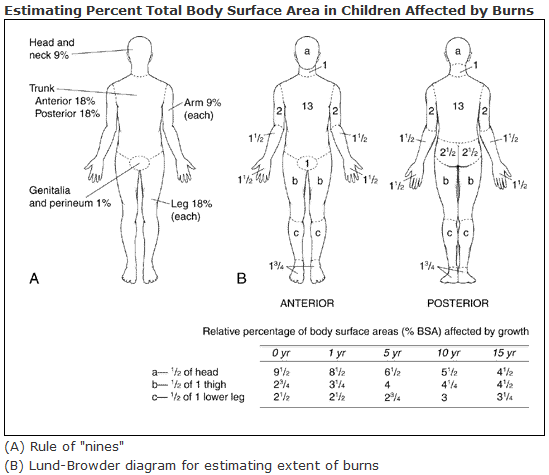
- The Lund and Browder Chart was first published in 1944 and was based on experience treating victims of the 1942 Cocoanut Grove fire
- Specialty: Emergency medicine/dermatology

The Lund and Browder chart is a tool useful in the management of burns for estimating the total body surface area affected. It was created by Dr. Charles Lund, Senior Surgeon at Boston City Hospital, and Dr. Newton Browder, based on their experiences in treating over 300 burn victims injured at the Cocoanut Grove fire in Boston in 1942.

Unlike the Wallace rule of nines, the Lund and Browder chart takes into consideration the age of the person, with decreasing percentage BSA for the head and increasing percentage BSA for the legs as the child ages, making it more useful in pediatric burns.

== See also ==
- Baux score
