= Children's Health (health care system) =

Geography
- Location: Texas, United States

Organization
- Affiliated university: University of Texas Southwestern Medical Center

Services
- Beds: 562

Links
- Website: http://www.childrens.com
- Lists: Hospitals in Texas

Children's Health is a pediatric health care system in North Texas anchored by two hospitals, Children's Medical Center Dallas and Children's Medical Center Plano, as well as seven specialty centers and 19 pediatric clinics located throughout the region. A private, not-for-profit organization, Children's Health provides pediatric health, wellness and acute care services for children from birth to age 21, including specialty care, primary care, home health, a pediatric research institute, and community outreach services.

According to Beckers Hospital Review, Children's Health is the fifth largest pediatric healthcare provider in the nation. Children's Health is also a pediatric kidney, liver, heart, bowel, and bone marrow transplant center, and includes a designated Level 1 trauma center.

Until 2014, Children's Health was known by the name of its main hospital, Children's Medical Center Dallas. In September 2014, it rebranded as Children's Health, legally known as Children's Health System of Texas.

== History ==
Children's Health traces its origins to the summer of 1913, when a group of nurses organized an open-air clinic, called the Dallas Baby Camp, on the lawn of the old Parkland Hospital in Dallas. In 1930, the Dallas Baby Camp grew into the Bradford Hospital for Babies, which merged with Children's Hospital of Texas and Richmond Freeman Memorial Clinic in 1948 to form what is now known as Children's Medical Center Dallas. Children's Medical Center affiliated with University of Texas Southwestern Medical Center in 1964. In 2014, Children's Medical Center expanded into Children's Health.

== Facilities ==
=== Children's Medical Center Dallas ===
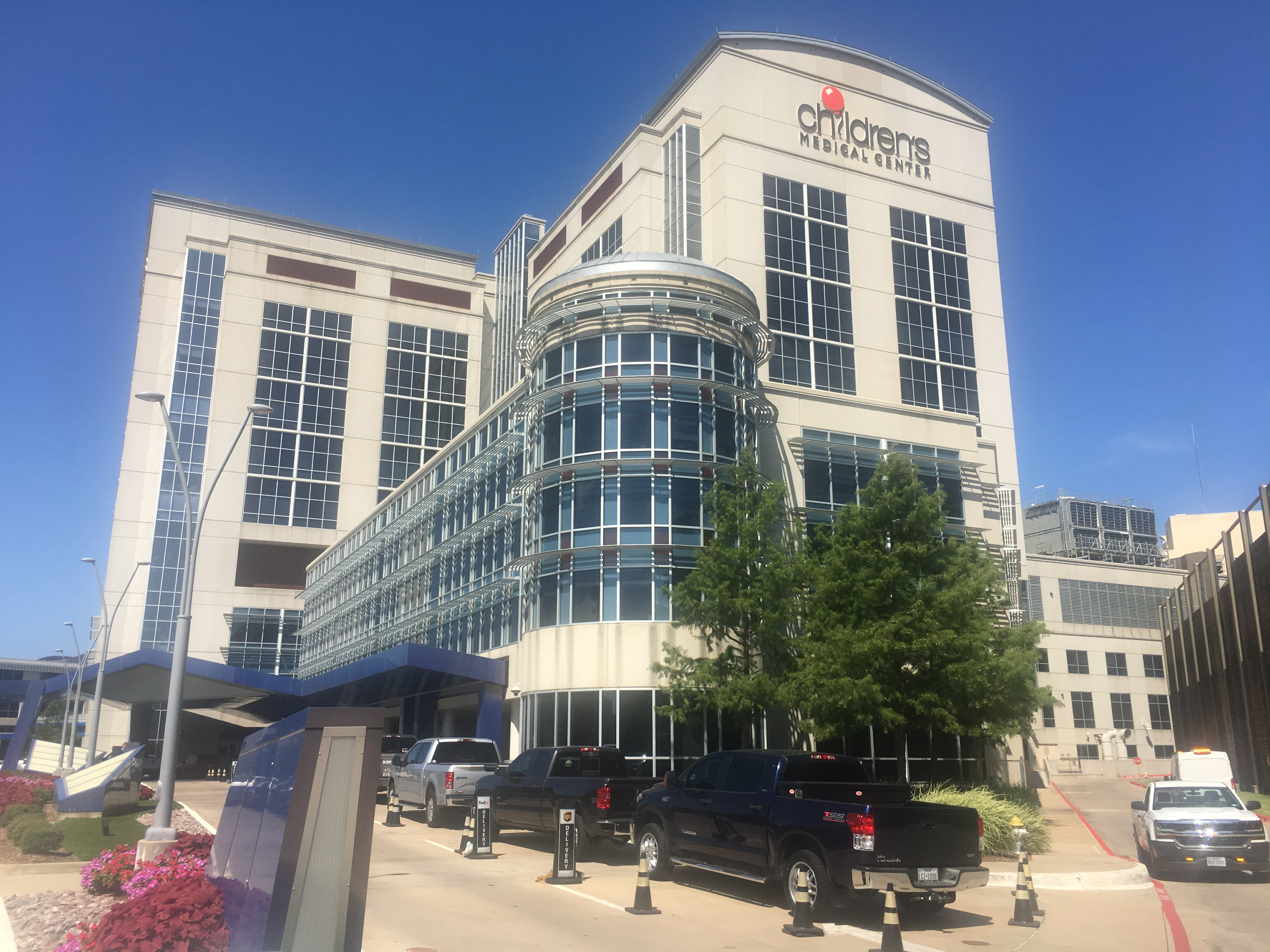

Children's Medical Center Dallas, the original hospital of the Children's Health system, is an academic medical center campus anchored by a 490-bed hospital It features 16 operating rooms and provides care in more than 60 specialties.

=== Children's Medical Center Plano ===
Built in 2008, Children's Medical Center Plano is the second hospital included in the Children's Health system. It is an academic medical center campus located adjacent to the Children's Health Specialty Center Plano. The hospital currently has 72 beds and four operating rooms. It offers 24-7 emergency services, and laboratory, pharmacy, and imaging services.

=== Children's Health Pediatric Group ===
Children's Health includes 19 pediatric primary care offices located throughout North Texas, specializing in health care for newborns, infants, and children through age 18. These locations include Bachman Lake, Medical District, Mill City, Carrollton, Celina, East Plano, Garland, Lake Highlands, McKinney, West Plano, Cedar Hill, Cockrell Hill, Grapevine, Irving, Lancaster Kiest, Oak Cliff, Pleasant Grove, St. Philip's, and Prosper.

=== Children's Health Specialty Centers ===
Seven Children's Health specialty centers located throughout North Texas offer subspecialty care, outpatient surgery, imaging, physical medicine, and rehabilitation. These centers are located in Southlake, at Texas Health Presbyterian Hospital in Dallas, in Plano, at the Bass Building, in Dallas across the street from Children's Medical Center Dallas, in Mesquite, and in Rockwall.

=== Children's Medical Center Research Institute at UT Southwestern ===
Children's Health is affiliated with University of Texas Southwestern Medical Center, one of the country's leading medical education and biomedical research institutions. Many UT Southwestern professors practice medicine at the nearby Children's Medical Center Dallas. The Children's Medical Center Research Institute, located in Dallas on the UT Southwestern campus, was established in 2011 with the purpose of performing biomedical research to better understand the biological basis of disease. Teams of Children's Health physicians and UT Southwestern scientists pursue advances in regenerative medicine, cancer biology, and metabolism.

=== Children's Health Andrews Institute for Orthopedics & Sports Medicine ===
In February 2015, Children's Health announced its partnership with orthopedic surgeon James Andrews. The new facility, to be located in Plano, will focus on orthopedic and sports medicine care, pediatric injury prevention, rehabilitation and therapy, and will also house an athletic performance center. The new facility was expected to be complete in late 2016, but had its official opening in May 2018.

In 2019, Children's Health Andrews Institute partnered with Rank One to create a mobile app to "provide more dependable, efficient, and accessible injury care for student-athletes."

== Community involvement ==
=== Health and Wellness Alliance for Children ===
The Health and Wellness Alliance for Children, created by Children's Health, is a coalition of more than 60 hospitals, social service organizations, faith-based organizations, school districts, government entities, and families focused on improving the health and well-being of children in the Dallas and Collin counties. The alliance's first areas of focus are asthma, the top reason for emergency department admissions at Children's Health, and weight management.

=== Local school programs ===
Through the TeleHealth program, Children's Health partners with local school nurses to provide access to physicians without forcing parents to leave work to take their child to the doctor. Children's Health also delivers routine check-ups and vaccinations to children at events throughout the region.

=== Rees-Jones Center for Foster Care Excellence ===
Children's Medical Center Dallas houses a foster care program, called the Rees-Jones Center for Foster Care Excellence, that provides support for children living with relatives or foster parents, or in a group home. The clinic focuses on support for foster parents and children, care coordination, and child welfare and health to encourage the children's recovery from neglect and abuse.

=== Dallas Children's Health Holiday Parade ===
The Dallas Children's Health Holiday Parade began in 1987 with a partnership between Adolphus Hotel and Children's Medical Center, who were both celebrating 75th year anniversaries. The parade kicks off the holiday season for the city with marching bands, famous characters, holiday floats, and balloons. The parade draws a crowd of more than 400,000. Children's Health discontinued their funding of the parade in 2016, but the parade has continued on with support from other community organizations

== GENECIS program ==
In May 2015, Children's Health announced the opening of the GENECIS clinic. GENECIS (GENder Education and Care, Interdisciplinary Support) provides counseling and support for children and teens with gender dysphoria through a combination of therapy, evaluations, and puberty-blocking medications. The clinic was started by Ximena Lopez, a pediatric endocrinologist at Children's Medical Center Dallas who has been treating patients with gender dysphoria for several years. It is the only pediatric transgender clinic in the Southwest. In November, 2021, the involved hospitals, Children's Health and UT Southwestern Medical Center, announced that they would no longer be providing puberty suppression or hormone therapy, removed all references to the GENECIS program from their websites, and said that any remaining services would be provided by other departments in the hospitals. In May 2023, it was revealed that the GENECIS program was intentionally targeted by anti-trans activists and groups in order to shut down the program though files that were publicly uploaded to the American College of Pediatricians's website.
