= Wallace rule of nines =

Estimate of total body surface area of burns

Body Part	Estimated BSA	
Body Part	Adults	Children
Entire left arm	9%	9%
Entire right arm	9%	9%
Head & neck	9%	18%
Entire chest	9%	9%
Entire abdomen	9% + 1% (Genitals)	9%
Entire back	18%	18%
Entire left leg	18%	14%
Entire right leg	18%	14%

The Wallace rule of nines is a tool used in pre-hospital and emergency medicine to estimate the total body surface area (BSA) affected by a burn. In addition to determining burn severity, the measurement of burn surface area is important for estimating patients' fluid requirements and determining hospital admission criteria.

Burn severity is determined through, among other things, the size of the skin affected. The image shows the makeup of different body parts, to help assess burn size.

The rule of nines was devised by Pulaski and Tennison in 1947, and published by Alexander Burns Wallace in 1951.

To estimate the body surface area of a burn, the rule of nines assigns BSA values to each major body part:

This allows the emergency medical provider to obtain a quick estimate of how much body surface area is burned. For example, if a patient's entire back (18%) and entire left leg (18%) are burned, about 36% of the patient's BSA is affected.

The BSAs assigned to each body part refer to the entire body part. So, for example, if half of a patient's left leg were burned, it would be assigned a BSA value of 9% (half the total surface area of the leg). Thus, if a patient's entire back (18%), but only half of their left leg (9%) was burned, the amount of BSA affected would be 27%.

== Accuracy ==
Some studies have raised concerns about the rule of nines' accuracy with obese patients, noting that "the proportional contribution of various major body segments to the total body surface area changes with obesity". One study found the rule's accuracy to be "reasonable" for patients weighing up to 80 kg, but proposed a new "rule of fives" for patients over that weight:

- 5% body surface area for each arm
- 20% BSA for each leg
- 50% for the trunk, and
- 2% for the head.

Other studies have found that the rule of nines tends to over-estimate total burn area, and that ratings can be subjective, but that it can be performed quickly and easily, and provide reasonable estimates for initial management of burn patients.

The rule of nines was designed for adult patients. It is less accurate in young children due to their proportionally bigger heads and smaller mass in the legs and thighs, although one study did find it was accurate for patients as small as 10 kg. To account for children's proportional differences, a "rule of nines for children" was proposed. The head is assigned 18% BSA while each leg is 13.5%. The remainder of the body parts retain the same BSA percentages used in the adult rule of nines.

== See also ==
- Baux score
- Lund and Browder chart
- PMF 5318 (1958) - Management of Burns — Part I, Supportive Care (instructional film)
