= Parkland Health & Hospital System =

Hospital district in Dallas, Texas

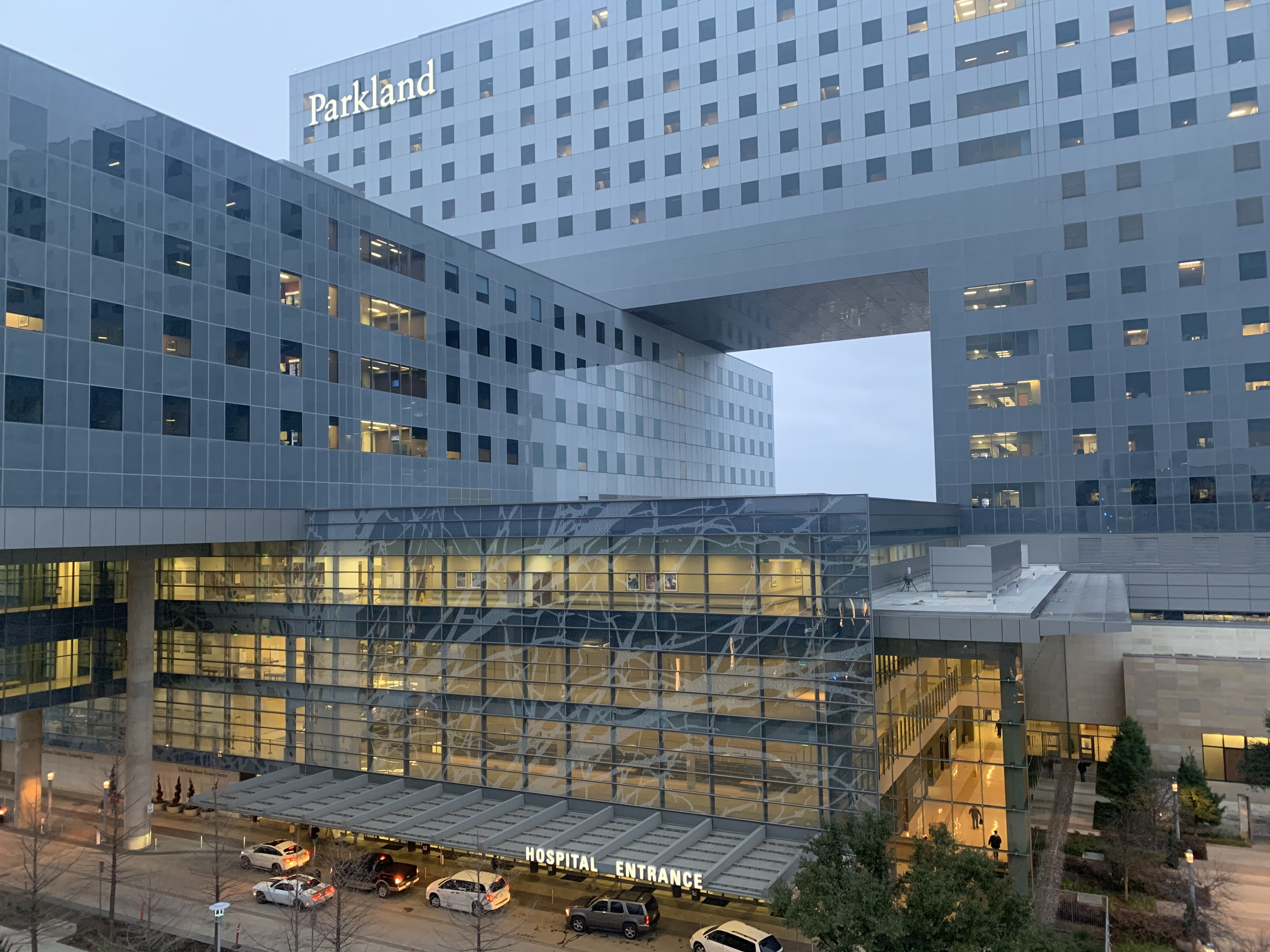
Parkland Memorial Hospital

The Dallas County Hospital District, doing business as Parkland Health, is the hospital district of Dallas County, Texas, United States. Its headquarters are in the Parkland Memorial Hospital in Dallas.

Parkland Health provides medical care to indigent patients in Dallas County.

Parkland Memorial Hospital is the primary hospital of the district.

== History ==
In 2009 the Greater Dallas Planning Council awarded the Dream Study Award to the district due to the district's master plan for its hospital. In 2009 Parkland Health & Hospital system began analyzing electronic medical records in order to use predictive modeling to help identify patients at high risk of hospital readmission. Initially the hospital focused on patients with congestive heart failure, but the program has expanded to include patients with diabetes, acute myocardial infarction, and pneumonia.

== Parkland Community Health Centers ==
Parkland Health operates several community clinics. The locations elsewhere are:

- Bluitt-Flowers Health Center
- C.V. Roman Health Center
- deHaro-Saldivar Health Center
- E. Carlyle Smith, Jr. Health Center
- Family Medicine Clinic
- Garland Health Center
- Garland Pediatric Health Center
- Geriatrics and Senior Care Center
- Hatcher Station Health Center
- Internal Medicine
- Irving Health Center
- Jubilee Park Community Clinic
- Oak West Health Center
- Pediatric Primary Care Center
- Southeast Dallas Health Center
- Vickery Health Center
- Vivian Field Youth & Family Center

== Youth and family centers ==
The district has several youth and family centers in area schools.

  - Vivian Field Youth & Family Center (Farmers Branch)
