= Parklands High School, Liverpool =

Parklands High School

Location
- Ganworth Road; Liverpool, Merseyside; England
- 53.3440°N 2.8395°W

Information
- Type: Foundation School
- Established: 2002
- Founder: Alan Smithies
- Closed: 2014
- Local authority: Liverpool
- Department for Education URN: 104702 Tables
- Ofsted: Reports
- Gender: Mixed
- Age: 11 to 18
- Enrolment: 390

Parklands High School was a secondary school located in the Speke area of Liverpool, England. It closed in summer 2014 with pupils transferring to other local schools.

The school was located on Ganworth Road in Speke, Liverpool.

The school opened in 2002 as a replacement for Speke Comprehensive School. The school was placed into special measures following a 2013 Ofsted inspection.
