= Parkland, Illinois =

- Unincorporated community
- Location within Illinois Location within the United States
- Coordinates: 40°27′45″N 89°45′05″W
- Country: United States
- State: Illinois
- County: Tazewell
- Elevation: 486 ft (148 m)
- Time zone: UTC-6 (Central (CST))
  - Summer (DST): UTC-5 (CDT)
- Area code: 309
- GNIS feature ID: 423055

Parkland (also Pretty Man) is an unincorporated community in Tazewell County, Illinois, United States.

== Notable people ==
United States Representative Harold H. Velde (1910-1985) was born in Parkland.
