= Burn =

Injury to flesh or skin, often caused by excessive heat

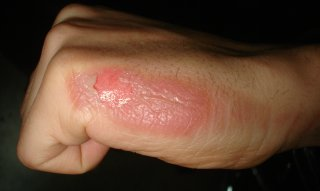
- Second-degree burn of the hand
- Specialty: Dermatology, critical care medicine, plastic surgery
- Symptoms: First degree: Red without blisters Second degree: Blisters and pain Third degree: Area stiff and not painful Fourth degree: Bone and tendon loss
- Complications: Infection
- Duration: Days to weeks
- Types: First degree, second degree, third degree, fourth degree
- Causes: Heat, cold, electricity, chemicals, friction, radiation
- Risk factors: Open cooking fires, unsafe cooking stoves, smoking, alcoholism, dangerous work environment
- Treatment: Depends on the severity
- Medication: Pain medication, intravenous fluids, tetanus toxoid
- Frequency: 67 million (2015)
- Deaths: 176,000 (2015)

A burn is an injury to skin, or other tissues, caused by heat, electricity, chemicals, friction, or ionizing radiation (such as sunburn, caused by ultraviolet radiation). Burns that affect only the superficial skin layers are known as superficial or first-degree burns. They appear red without blisters, and pain typically lasts around three days. When the injury extends into some of the underlying skin layer, it is a partial-thickness or second-degree burn. Blisters are frequently present and they are often very painful. Healing can require up to eight weeks and scarring may occur. In a full-thickness or third-degree burn, the injury extends to all layers of the skin. Often there is no pain and the burnt area is stiff. Healing typically does not occur on its own. A fourth-degree burn additionally involves injury to deeper tissues, such as muscle, tendons, or bone. The burn is often black and frequently leads to loss of the burned part.

Most burns are thermal burns caused by contact with heat from hot fluids (called scalding), solids, or fire. Burns occur mainly in the home or the workplace. In the home, risks are associated with domestic kitchens, including stoves, flames, and hot liquids. In the workplace, risks are associated with fire and chemical and electric burns. Alcoholism and smoking are other risk factors. Burns can also occur as a result of self-harm or violence between people (assault).

Burns are generally preventable. Treatment depends on the severity of the burn. Superficial burns may be managed with little more than simple pain medication, while major burns may require prolonged treatment in specialized burn centers. Cooling with tap water may help pain and decrease damage; however, prolonged cooling may result in low body temperature. Partial-thickness burns may require cleaning with soap and water, followed by dressings. It is not clear how to manage blisters, but it is probably reasonable to leave them intact if small and drain them if large. Full-thickness burns usually require surgical treatments, such as skin grafting. Extensive burns often require large amounts of intravenous fluid, due to capillary fluid leakage and tissue swelling. The most common complications of burns involve infection. Tetanus toxoid should be given if not up to date.

The World Health Organization estimated that about 163,000 people died from fire, heat and hot substances in 2023. In 2015, fire and heat resulted in 67 million injuries. Fire, heat and hot substances caused about 2.9 million hospitalizations in 2013 and 176,000 deaths in 2015. Among women in much of the world, burns are most commonly related to the use of open cooking fires or unsafe cook stoves. Among men, they are more likely a result of unsafe workplace conditions. Most deaths due to burns occur in the developing world, particularly in Southeast Asia. While large burns can be fatal, treatments developed since 1960 have improved outcomes, especially in children and young adults. In the United States, approximately 96% of those admitted to a burn center survive their injuries. The long-term outcome is related to the size of burn and the age of the person affected.

== Signs and symptoms ==
The characteristics of a burn depend upon its depth. Superficial burns cause pain lasting two or three days, followed by peeling of the skin over the next few days. Individuals with more severe burns may indicate discomfort or complain of feeling pressure rather than pain. Full-thickness burns may be entirely insensitive to light touch or puncture. While superficial burns are typically red in color, severe burns may be pink, white or black. Burns around the mouth or singed hair inside the nose may indicate that burns to the airways have occurred, but these findings are not definitive. More worrisome signs include: shortness of breath, hoarseness, and stridor or wheezing. Itchiness is common during the healing process, occurring in up to 90% of adults and nearly all children. Numbness or tingling may persist for a prolonged period of time after an electrical injury. Burns may also produce emotional and psychological distress.

| Type | Layers involved | Appearance | Texture | Sensation | Healing time | Prognosis and complications | Example |
|---|---|---|---|---|---|---|---|
| Superficial (first-degree) | Epidermis | Red without blisters | Dry | Painful | 5–10 days | Heals well. | A sunburn is a typical first-degree burn. |
| Superficial partial thickness (second-degree) | Extends into superficial (papillary) dermis | Redness with clear blister. Blanches with pressure. | Moist | Very painful | 2–3 weeks | Local infection (cellulitis) but no scarring typically | Second-degree burn of the thumb |
| Deep partial thickness (second-degree) | Extends into deep (reticular) dermis | Yellow or white. Less blanching. May be blistering. | Fairly dry | Pressure and discomfort | 3–8 weeks | Scarring, contractures (may require excision and skin grafting) | Second-degree burn caused by contact with boiling water |
| Full thickness (third-degree) | Extends through entire dermis | Stiff and white/brown. No blanching. | Leathery | Painless | Prolonged (months) and unfinished/incomplete | Scarring, contractures, amputation (early excision recommended) | Eight day old third-degree burn caused by motorcycle muffler. |
| Fourth-degree | Extends through entire skin, and into underlying fat, muscle and bone | Black; charred with eschar | Dry | Painless | Does not heal; Requires excision | Amputation, significant functional impairment and, in some cases, death. | 4th-degree electrical burn |

== Cause ==
Burns are caused by a variety of external sources classified as thermal (heat-related), chemical, electrical, and radiation. In the United States, the most common causes of burns are: fire or flame (44%), scalds (33%), hot objects (9%), electricity (4%), and chemicals (3%). Most (69%) burn injuries occur at home or at work (9%), and most are accidental, with 2% due to assault by another, and 1–2% resulting from a suicide attempt. These sources can cause inhalation injury to the airway and/or lungs, occurring in about 6%.

Burn injuries occur more commonly among the poor. Smoking and alcoholism are other risk factors. Fire-related burns are generally more common in colder climates. Specific risk factors in the developing world include cooking with open fires or on the floor as well as developmental disabilities in children and chronic diseases in adults.

=== Thermal ===
Fire deaths by age

In the United States, fire and hot liquids are the most common causes of burns. Of house fires that result in death, smoking causes 25% and heating devices cause 22%. Almost half of injuries are due to efforts to fight a fire. Scalding is caused by hot liquids or gases and most commonly occurs from exposure to hot drinks, high temperature tap water in baths or showers, hot cooking oil, or steam. Scald injuries are most common in children under the age of five and, in the United States and Australia, this population makes up about two-thirds of all burns. Contact with hot objects is the cause of about 20–30% of burns in children. Generally, scalds are first- or second-degree burns, but third-degree burns may also result, especially with prolonged contact. Fireworks are a common cause of burns during holiday seasons in many countries. This is a particular risk for adolescent males. In the United States, for non-fatal burn injuries to children, white males under the age of 6 comprise most cases. Thermal burns from grabbing/touching and spilling/splashing were the most common type of burn and mechanism, while the bodily areas most impacted were hands and fingers followed by head/neck.

=== Chemical ===
Chemical burns can be caused by over 25,000 substances, most of which are either a strong base (55%) or a strong acid (26%). Most chemical burn deaths are secondary to ingestion. Common agents include: sulfuric acid as found in toilet cleaners, sodium hypochlorite as found in bleach, and halogenated hydrocarbons as found in paint remover, among others. Hydrofluoric acid can cause particularly deep burns that may not become symptomatic until some time after exposure. Formic acid may cause the breakdown of significant numbers of red blood cells.

=== Electrical ===
Electrical burns or injuries are classified as high voltage (greater than or equal to 1000 volts), low voltage (less than 1000 volts), or as flash burns secondary to an electric arc. The most common causes of electrical burns in children are electrical cords (60%) followed by electrical outlets (14%). Lightning may also result in electrical burns. Risk factors for being struck include involvement in outdoor activities such as mountain climbing, golf and field sports, and working outside. Mortality from a lightning strike is about 10%.

While electrical injuries primarily result in burns, they may also cause fractures or dislocations secondary to blunt force trauma or muscle contractions. In high voltage injuries, most damage may occur internally and thus the extent of the injury cannot be judged by examination of the skin alone. Contact with either low voltage or high voltage may produce cardiac arrhythmias or cardiac arrest.

=== Radiation ===
Radiation burns may be caused by protracted exposure to ultraviolet light (such as from the sun, tanning booths or arc welding) or from ionizing radiation (such as from radiation therapy, X-rays or radioactive fallout). Sun exposure is the most common cause of radiation burns and the most common cause of superficial burns overall. There is significant variation in how easily people sunburn based on their skin type. Skin effects from ionizing radiation depend on the amount of exposure to the area, with hair loss seen after 3 Gy, redness seen after 10 Gy, wet skin peeling after 20 Gy, and necrosis after 30 Gy. Redness, if it occurs, may not appear until some time after exposure. Radiation burns are treated the same as other burns. Microwave burns occur via thermal heating caused by the microwaves. While exposures as short as two seconds may cause injury, overall this is an uncommon occurrence.

=== Non-accidental ===
In those hospitalized from scalds or fire burns, 3–10% are from assault. Reasons include: child abuse, personal disputes, spousal abuse, elder abuse, and business disputes. An immersion injury or immersion scald may indicate child abuse. It is created when an extremity, or sometimes the buttocks are held under the surface of hot water. It typically produces a sharp upper border and is often symmetrical, known as "sock burns", "glove burns", or "zebra stripes" - where folds have prevented certain areas from burning. Deliberate cigarette burns are most often found on the face, or the back of the hands and feet. Other high-risk signs of potential abuse include: circumferential burns, the absence of splash marks, a burn of uniform depth, and association with other signs of neglect or abuse.

Bride burning, a form of domestic violence, occurs in some cultures, such as India where women have been burned in revenge for what the husband or his family consider an inadequate dowry. In Pakistan, acid burns represent 13% of intentional burns, and are frequently related to domestic violence. Self-immolation (setting oneself on fire) is also used as a form of protest in various parts of the world.

== Pathophysiology ==
Three degrees of burns

At temperatures greater than 44 °C (111 °F), proteins begin losing their three-dimensional shape and start breaking down. This results in cell and tissue damage. Many of the direct health effects of a burn are caused by failure of the skin to perform its normal functions, which include: protection from bacteria, skin sensation, body temperature regulation, and prevention of evaporation of the body's water. Disruption of these functions can lead to infection, loss of skin sensation, hypothermia, and hypovolemic shock via dehydration (i.e. water in the body evaporated away). Disruption of cell membranes causes cells to lose potassium to the spaces outside the cell and to take up water and sodium.

In large burns (over 30% of the total body surface area), there is a significant inflammatory response. This results in increased leakage of fluid from the capillaries, and subsequent tissue edema. This causes overall blood volume loss, with the remaining blood suffering significant plasma loss, making the blood more concentrated. Poor blood flow to organs like the kidneys and gastrointestinal tract may result in kidney failure and stomach ulcers.

Increased levels of catecholamines and cortisol can cause a hypermetabolic state that can last for years. This is associated with increased cardiac output, metabolism, a fast heart rate, and poor immune function.

== Diagnosis ==
Burns can be classified by depth, mechanism of injury, extent, and associated injuries. The most commonly used classification is based on the depth of injury. The depth of a burn is usually determined via examination, although a biopsy may also be used. It may be difficult to accurately determine the depth of a burn on a single examination and repeated examinations over a few days may be necessary. In those who have a headache or are dizzy and have a fire-related burn, carbon monoxide poisoning should be considered. Cyanide poisoning should also be considered.

=== Size ===
Burn grade is determined through, among other things, the size of the skin affected. The image shows the makeup of different body parts, to help assess burn size.

The size of a burn is measured as a percentage of total body surface area (TBSA) affected by partial thickness or full thickness burns. First-degree burns that are only red in color and are not blistering are not included in this estimation. Most burns (70%) involve less than 10% of the TBSA. Unit of measuring burns is VSD as 10% TBSA is equal to 1VSD.

There are a number of methods to determine the TBSA, including the Wallace rule of nines, Lund and Browder chart, and estimations based on a person's palm size. The rule of nines is easy to remember but only accurate in people over 16 years of age. More accurate estimates can be made using Lund and Browder charts, which take into account the different proportions of body parts in adults and children. The size of a person's handprint (including the palm and fingers) is approximately 1% of their TBSA.

=== Severity ===
American Burn Association severity classification
| Minor | Moderate | Major |
|---|---|---|
| Adult <10% TBSA | Adult 10–20% TBSA | Adult >20% TBSA |
| Young or old < 5% TBSA | Young or old 5–10% TBSA | Young or old >10% TBSA |
| <2% full thickness burn | 2–5% full thickness burn | >5% full thickness burn |
| | High voltage injury | High voltage burn |
| | Possible inhalation injury | Known inhalation injury |
| | Circumferential burn | Significant burn to face, joints, hands, or feet |
| | Other health problems | Associated injuries |

To determine the need for referral to a specialized burn unit, the American Burn Association devised a classification system. Under this system, burns can be classified as major, moderate, and minor. This is assessed based on a number of factors, including total body surface area affected, the involvement of specific anatomical zones, the age of the person, and associated injuries. Minor burns can typically be managed at home, moderate burns are often managed in a hospital, and major burns are managed by a burn center. Severe burn injury represents one of the most devastating forms of trauma. Despite improvements in burn care, patients can be left to suffer for as many as three years post-injury.

== Prevention ==
Historically, about half of all burns were deemed preventable. Burn prevention programs have significantly decreased rates of serious burns. Preventive measures include: limiting hot water temperatures, smoke alarms, sprinkler systems, proper construction of buildings, and fire-resistant clothing. Experts recommend setting water heaters below 48.8 °C (119.8 °F). Other measures to prevent scalds include using a thermometer to measure bath water temperatures, and splash guards on stoves. While the effect of the regulation of fireworks is unclear, there is tentative evidence of benefit with recommendations including the limitation of the sale of fireworks to children.

== Management ==
Resuscitation begins with the assessment and stabilization of the person's airway, breathing and circulation. If inhalation injury is suspected, early intubation may be required. This is followed by care of the burn wound itself. People with extensive burns may be wrapped in clean sheets until they arrive at a hospital. As burn wounds are prone to infection, a tetanus booster shot should be given if an individual has not been immunized within the last five years. In the United States, 95% of burns that present to the emergency department are treated and discharged; 5% require hospital admission. With major burns, early feeding is important. Protein intake should also be increased, and trace elements and vitamins are often required. Hyperbaric oxygenation may be useful in addition to traditional treatments.

=== Intravenous fluids ===
In those with poor tissue perfusion, boluses of isotonic crystalloid solution should be given. In children with more than 10–20% TBSA (Total Body Surface Area) burns, and adults with more than 15% TBSA burns, formal fluid resuscitation and monitoring should follow. This should be begun pre-hospital if possible in those with burns greater than 25% TBSA. The Parkland formula can help determine the volume of intravenous fluids required over the first 24 hours. The formula is based on the affected individual's TBSA and weight. Half of the fluid is administered over the first 8 hours, and the remainder over the following 16 hours. The time is calculated from when the burn occurred, and not from the time that fluid resuscitation began. Children require additional maintenance fluid that includes glucose. Additionally, those with inhalation injuries require more fluid. While inadequate fluid resuscitation may cause problems, over-resuscitation can also be detrimental. The formulas are only a guide, with infusions ideally tailored to a urinary output of >30 mL/h in adults or >1mL/kg in children and mean arterial pressure greater than 60 mmHg.

While lactated Ringer's solution is often used, there is no evidence that it is superior to normal saline. Crystalloid fluids appear just as good as colloid fluids, and as colloids are more expensive they are not recommended. Blood transfusions are rarely required. They are typically only recommended when the hemoglobin level falls below 60-80 g/L (6-8 g/dL) due to the associated risk of complications. Intravenous catheters may be placed through burned skin if needed or intraosseous infusions may be used.

=== Wound care ===
Early cooling (within 30 minutes of the burn) reduces burn depth and pain, but care must be taken as over-cooling can result in hypothermia. It should be performed with cool water 10–25 °C (50–77 °F) and not ice water as the latter can cause further injury.

First aid guidance commonly advises about 20 minutes of cool running water for smaller burns, while keeping the rest of the person warm, although the best duration of cooling remains uncertain. A 2022 systematic review and meta-analysis found that 20 minutes of cool running water given within three hours of injury was associated with lower odds of needing skin grafting or surgery.

Chemical burns may require extensive irrigation. Cleaning with soap and water, removal of dead tissue, and application of dressings are important aspects of wound care. If intact blisters are present, it is not clear what should be done with them. Some tentative evidence supports leaving them intact. Second-degree burns should be re-evaluated after two days.

In the management of first and second-degree burns, little quality evidence exists to determine which dressing type to use. It is reasonable to manage first-degree burns without dressings. While topical antibiotics are often recommended, there is little evidence to support their use. Silver sulfadiazine (a type of antibiotic) is not recommended as it potentially prolongs healing time. There is insufficient evidence to support the use of dressings containing silver or negative-pressure wound therapy. Silver sulfadiazine does not appear to differ from silver containing foam dressings with respect to healing.

=== Medications ===
Burns can be very painful and a number of different options may be used for pain management. These include simple analgesics (such as ibuprofen and acetaminophen) and opioids such as morphine. Benzodiazepines may be used in addition to analgesics to help with anxiety. During the healing process, antihistamines, massage, or transcutaneous nerve stimulation may be used to aid with itching. Antihistamines, however, are only effective for this purpose in 20% of people. There is tentative evidence supporting the use of gabapentin and its use may be reasonable in those who do not improve with antihistamines. Intravenous lidocaine requires more study before it can be recommended for pain.

Intravenous antibiotics are recommended before surgery for those with extensive burns (>60% TBSA). As of 2008, guidelines do not recommend their general use due to concerns regarding antibiotic resistance and the increased risk of fungal infections. Tentative evidence, however, shows that they may improve survival rates in those with large and severe burns. Erythropoietin has not been found effective to prevent or treat anemia in burn cases. In burns caused by hydrofluoric acid, calcium gluconate is a specific antidote and may be used intravenously and/or topically. Recombinant human growth hormone (rhGH) in those with burns that involve more than 40% of their body appears to speed healing without affecting the risk of death. The use of steroids is of unclear evidence.

Allogeneic cultured keratinocytes and dermal fibroblasts in murine collagen (Stratagraft) was approved for medical use in the United States in June 2021.

=== Surgery ===
Wounds requiring surgical closure with skin grafts or flaps (typically anything more than a small full thickness burn) should be dealt with as early as possible. Circumferential burns of the limbs or chest may need urgent surgical release of the skin, known as an escharotomy. The aim is to release the pressure from the underlying deeper tissue and enable ventilation to the lungs and circulation to the limb. It is uncertain if it is useful for neck or digit burns. Fasciotomies may be required for electrical burns.

Skin grafts can involve temporary skin substitutes, derived from animal (human donor or pig) skin or synthesized. They are used to cover the wound as a dressing, preventing infection and fluid loss, but will eventually need to be removed. Alternatively, human skin can be treated to be left on permanently without rejection.

There is no evidence that the use of copper sulphate to visualise phosphorus particles for removal can help with wound healing due to phosphorus burns. Meanwhile, absorption of copper sulphate into the blood circulation can be harmful.

=== Alternative medicine ===
Honey has been used since ancient times to aid wound healing and may be beneficial in first- and second-degree burns. There is moderate evidence that honey helps heal partial thickness burns. The evidence for aloe vera is of poor quality. While it might be beneficial in reducing pain, and a review from 2007 found tentative evidence of improved healing times, a subsequent review from 2012 did not find improved healing over silver sulfadiazine. A 2014 review found only three randomized controlled trials for the use of plants for burns, two for aloe vera and one for oatmeal. The number of randomized control trials for aloe vera had increased to nine by 2024, when a review found a significant improvement in healing time but not pain relief.

There is little evidence that vitamin E helps with keloids or scarring. Butter is not recommended. In low income countries, burns are treated up to one-third of the time with traditional medicine, which may include applications of eggs, mud, leaves or cow dung. Surgical management is limited in some cases due to insufficient financial resources and availability.

=== Pain management ===
There are a number of other methods that may be used in addition to medications to reduce procedural pain and anxiety including virtual reality therapy, hypnosis, and behavioral approaches such as distraction techniques. In adults, a 2018 meta-analysis of 21 randomized controlled trials found that non-drug methods reduced pain during burn wound care, with the largest effects for distraction, particularly using virtual reality, and for hypnosis. They also had a small effect on anxiety. A separate 2018 meta-analysis of six trials found that hypnosis reduced pain and anxiety during adult wound care but did not reduce medication use, and its authors judged clinical recommendations premature. A 2026 review rated the certainty of the evidence for these methods' effect on pain as low, and described them as additions to, not replacements for, pain medication.

A 2000 case report of two adolescents, described by its authors as the first evidence for the approach, found that immersive virtual reality reduced pain during burn wound care compared with playing a video game. Systematic reviews of randomized controlled trials have since found that virtual reality reduces the intensity and unpleasantness of pain, and the time spent thinking about pain, during burn wound care and physical therapy. In children, a 2025 meta-analysis of 15 trials with 622 participants found reductions in both pain and anxiety during wound care. The evidence in adults is less certain: a 2025 meta-analysis of trials in people with burns and other wounds found the largest effect in children and no significant effect in adults.

In burn rehabilitation, a 2023 meta-analysis of 16 trials found that virtual reality-based therapy improved joint range of motion, quality of life and work performance, and reduced anxiety, but did not improve grip or pinch strength.

=== Patient support ===
Burn patients require support and care – both physiological and psychological. Respiratory failure, sepsis, and multi-organ system failure are common in hospitalized burn patients. Many clinical practice guidelines recommend raising the ambient temperature when caring for severely burned patients in the operating room and intensive care unit, to prevent hypothermia and limit the effects of hypermetabolism, although the evidence for this is limited.

Metabolism in burn patients proceeds at a higher than normal speed due to the whole-body process and rapid fatty acid substrate cycles, which can be countered with an adequate supply of energy, nutrients, and antioxidants. Enteral feeding a day after resuscitation is required to reduce risk of infection, recovery time, non-infectious complications, hospital stay, long-term damage, and mortality. Controlling blood glucose levels can have an impact on liver function and survival.

Risk of thromboembolism is high and acute respiratory distress syndrome (ARDS) that does not resolve with maximal ventilator use is also a common complication. Scars are long-term after-effects of a burn injury. Psychological support is required to cope with the aftermath of a fire accident, while to prevent scars and long-term damage to the skin and other body structures consulting with burn specialists, preventing infections, consuming nutritious foods, early and aggressive rehabilitation, and using compressive clothing are recommended.

== Prognosis ==
Prognosis in the US
| TBSA | Mortality |
|---|---|
| 0–9% | 0.6% |
| 10–19% | 2.9% |
| 20–29% | 8.6% |
| 30–39% | 16% |
| 40–49% | 25% |
| 50–59% | 37% |
| 60–69% | 43% |
| 70–79% | 57% |
| 80–89% | 73% |
| 90–100% | 85% |
| Inhalation | 23% |

The prognosis is worse in those with larger burns, those who are older, and females. The presence of a smoke inhalation injury, other significant injuries such as long bone fractures, and serious co-morbidities (e.g. heart disease, diabetes, psychiatric illness, and suicidal intent) also influence prognosis. On average, of those admitted to burn centers in the United States, 4% die, with the outcome for individuals dependent on the extent of the burn injury. For example, admittees with burn areas less than 10% TBSA had a mortality rate of less than 1%, while admittees with over 90% TBSA had a mortality rate of 85%. In Afghanistan, people with more than 60% TBSA burns rarely survive. The Baux score has historically been used to determine prognosis of major burns. However, with improved care, it is no longer very accurate. The score is determined by adding the size of the burn (% TBSA) to the age of the person and taking that to be more or less equal to the risk of death. Burns in 2013 resulted in 1.2 million years lived with disability and 12.3 million disability adjusted life years.

=== Complications ===
A number of complications may occur, with infections being the most common. In order of frequency, potential complications include: pneumonia, cellulitis, urinary tract infections and respiratory failure. Risk factors for infection include: burns of more than 30% TBSA, full-thickness burns, extremes of age (young or old), or burns involving the legs or perineum. Pneumonia occurs particularly commonly in those with inhalation injuries.

Anemia secondary to full thickness burns of greater than 10% TBSA is common. Electrical burns may lead to compartment syndrome or rhabdomyolysis due to muscle breakdown. Blood clotting in the veins of the legs is estimated to occur in 6 to 25% of people. The hypermetabolic state that may persist for years after a major burn can result in a decrease in bone density and a loss of muscle mass. Keloids may form subsequent to a burn, particularly in those who are young and dark skinned. Following a burn, children may have significant psychological trauma and experience post-traumatic stress disorder. Scarring may also result in a disturbance in body image. To treat hypertrophic scars (raised, tense, stiff and itchy scars) and limit their effect on physical function and everyday activities, silicone sheeting and compression garments are recommended. In the developing world, significant burns may result in social isolation, extreme poverty and child abandonment.

== Epidemiology ==
Fire death rates

In 2015 fire and heat resulted in 67 million injuries. This resulted in about 2.9 million hospitalizations and 238,000 dying. This is down from 300,000 deaths in 1990. This makes it the fourth leading cause of injuries after motor vehicle collisions, falls, and violence. About 90% of burns occur in the developing world. This has been attributed partly to overcrowding and an unsafe cooking situation. Overall, nearly 60% of fatal burns occur in Southeast Asia with a rate of 11.6 per 100,000. The number of fatal burns has decreased from 280,000 in 1990 to 176,000 in 2015.

In the developed world, adult males have twice the mortality as females from burns. This is most probably due to their higher risk occupations and greater risk-taking activities. In many countries in the developing world, however, females have twice the risk of males. This is often related to accidents in the kitchen or domestic violence. In children, deaths from burns occur at more than ten times the rate in the developing than the developed world. Overall, in children it is one of the top fifteen leading causes of death. From the 1980s to 2004, many countries have seen both a decrease in the rates of fatal burns and in burns generally.

=== Developed countries ===
An estimated 500,000 burn injuries receive medical treatment yearly in the United States. They resulted in about 3,300 deaths in 2008. Most burns (70%) and deaths from burns occur in males. The highest incidence of fire burns occurs in those 18–35 years old, while the highest incidence of scalds occurs in children less than five years old and adults over 65. Electrical burns result in about 1,000 deaths per year. Lightning results in the death of about 60 people a year. In Europe, intentional burns occur most commonly in middle aged men.

=== Developing countries ===
In India, about 700,000 to 800,000 people per year sustain significant burns, though very few are looked after in specialist burn units. The highest rates occur in women 16–35 years of age. Part of this high rate is related to unsafe kitchens and loose-fitting clothing typical to India. It is estimated that one-third of all burns in India are due to clothing catching fire from open flames. Intentional burns are also a common cause and occur at high rates in young women, secondary to domestic violence and self-harm.

== History ==
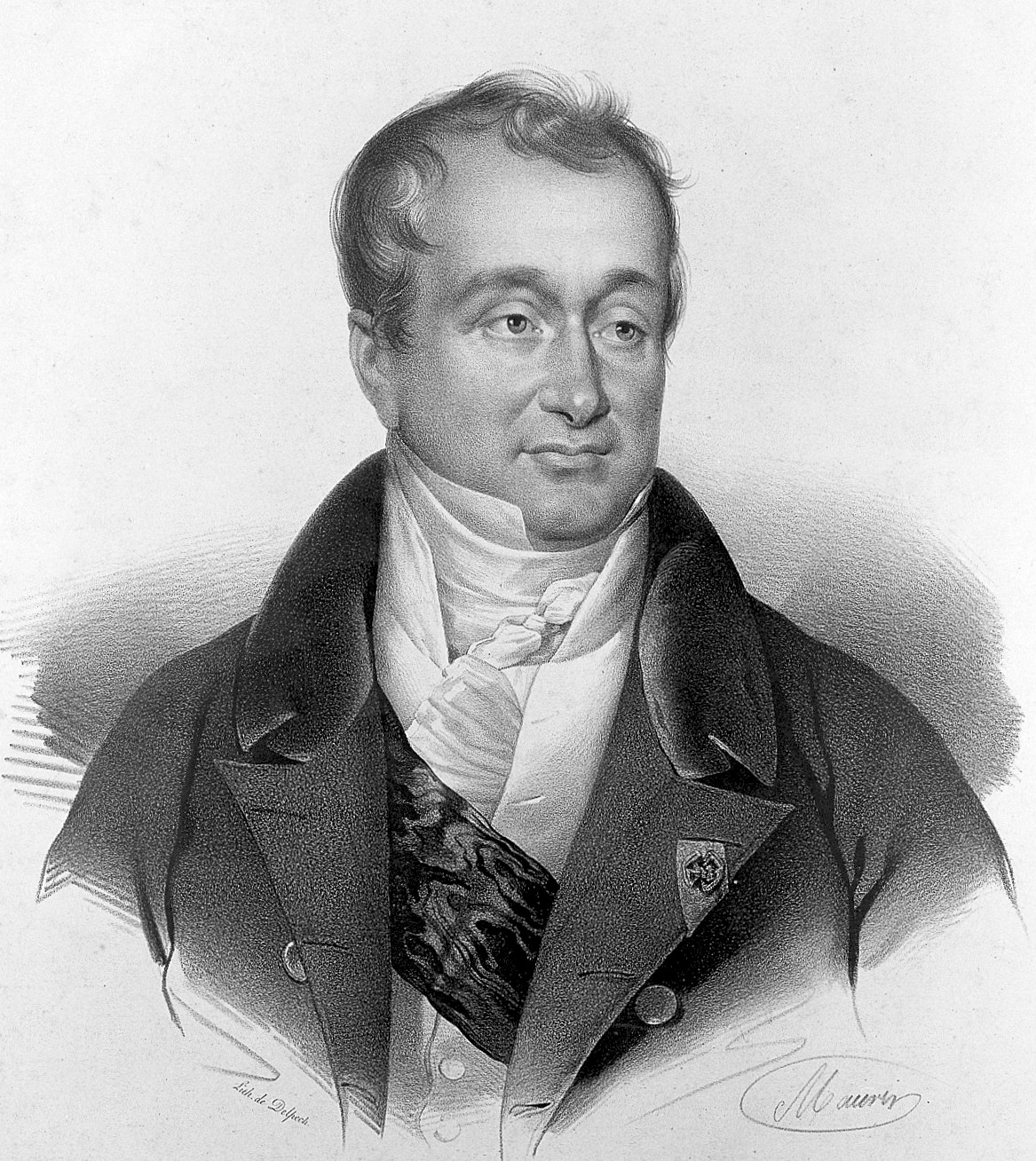
Guillaume Dupuytren (1777–1835), who developed the degree classification of burns

Cave paintings from more than 3,500 years ago document burns and their management. The earliest Egyptian records on treating burns describes dressings prepared with milk from mothers of baby boys, and the 1500 BCE Edwin Smith Papyrus describes treatments using honey and the salve of resin. Many other treatments have been used over the ages, including the use of tea leaves by the Chinese documented to 600 BCE, pig fat and vinegar by Hippocrates documented to 400 BCE, and wine and myrrh by Celsus documented to the 1st century CE. French barber-surgeon Ambroise Paré was the first to describe different degrees of burns in the 1500s. Guillaume Dupuytren expanded these degrees into six different severities in 1832.

The first hospital to treat burns opened in 1843 in London, England, and the development of modern burn care began in the late 1800s and early 1900s. During World War I, Henry D. Dakin and Alexis Carrel developed standards for the cleaning and disinfecting of burns and wounds using sodium hypochlorite solutions, which significantly reduced mortality. In the 1940s, the importance of early excision and skin grafting was acknowledged, and around the same time, fluid resuscitation and formulas to guide it were developed. In the 1970s, researchers demonstrated the significance of the hypermetabolic state that follows large burns.

The "Evans formula", described in 1952, was the first burn resuscitation formula based on body weight and surface area (BSA) damaged. The first 24 hours of treatment entails 1ml/kg/% BSA of crystalloids plus 1 ml/kg/% BSA colloids plus 2000ml glucose in water, and in the next 24 hours, crystalloids at 0.5 ml/kg/% BSA, colloids at 0.5 ml/kg/% BSA, and the same amount of glucose in water.
