= Parkland Memorial Hospital =

Hospital in Dallas, Texas

- Parkland Health & Hospital System

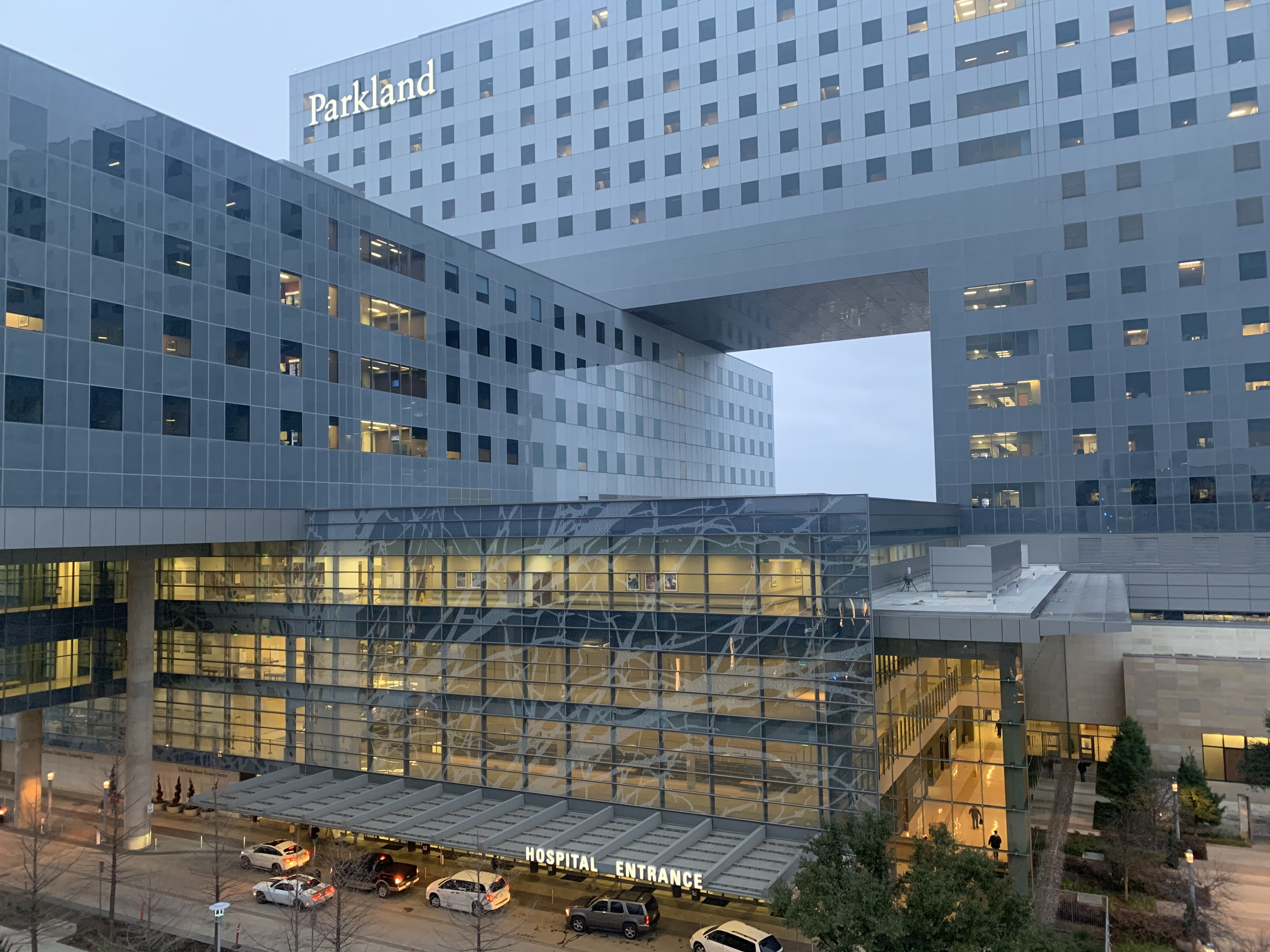
- Parkland Memorial new hospital building dedicated in 2015

Geography
- Location: 5200 Harry Hines Boulevard, Dallas, Texas, United States
- Coordinates: 32°48′37″N 96°50′20″W

Organization
- Care system: Public
- Type: General assist and Intern teaching
- Affiliated university: UT Southwestern Medical Center

Services
- Emergency department: Level I trauma center
- Beds: 983

Helipads
- Helipad: Yes

History
- Founded: May 19, 1894; 132 years ago

Links
- Website: ParklandHealth.org
- Lists: Hospitals in Texas

Parkland Memorial Hospital is a public hospital located in Dallas, Texas. It is the main hospital of the Parkland Health & Hospital System and serves as Dallas County's public hospital. It is located within the Southwestern Medical District. The hospital is staffed by the faculty, residents, and medical students of UT Southwestern Medical Center. Parkland Hospital was first established on Maple Avenue in 1894. In 1954, the hospital relocated to a second campus on Harry Hines Boulevard. A third facility, located across the street from the second site, opened in 2015 and remains the current location as of 2025. The second campus was demolished between 2024 and 2025. The Parkland Medical District continues to provide services and medical education to Dallas County.

== History ==
=== Original hospital campus location ===
- Parkland Hospital
- U.S. National Register of Historic Places
- Dallas Landmark
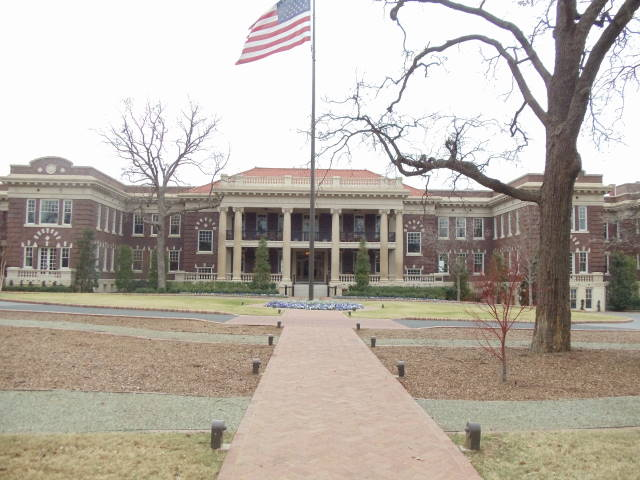
- Parkland Hospital (1913-1954)

- Location within Texas Location within the United States
- Location: 3819 Maple Ave., Dallas, Texas
- Coordinates: 32°48′15″N 96°48′56″W
- Area: 3.3 acres (1.3 ha)
- Built: 1913
- Built by: G. W. Sonnefield
- Architect: Hubbell & Greene
- Architectural style: Colonial Revival, Georgian Revival
- NRHP reference No.: 10000249
- DLMK No.: H/31

Significant dates
- Added to NRHP: October 25, 2011
- Designated DLMK: January 7, 1987

The original hospital opened on May 19, 1894, in a wooden building on a 17-acre (6.9 ha) meadow located at Oak Lawn and Maple avenues. The name Parkland came from the land on which the hospital was built, originally purchased by the city as a park. A brick building (the first hospital brick building erected in Texas, now owned by Crow Holdings) replaced the wooden facility in 1913. All services from the campus at Maple Avenue were decommissioned in 1974.

=== 1954–2015 second hospital campus location ===
In 1954, Parkland moved to 5201 Harry Hines Boulevard, about a mile from its original site. Its renal dialysis unit opened in 1955, the burns unit in 1961, and the cardiac intensive care unit in 1969. The new Parkland tower blocks were redeveloped in 1981, and the triangular wing at the hospital's entrance on Harry Hines Boulevard opened in the late 1980s.

The former hospital site at 5201 Harry Hines Boulevard was demolished in 2024, after closing on July 11, 2022.

==== John F. Kennedy assassination ====
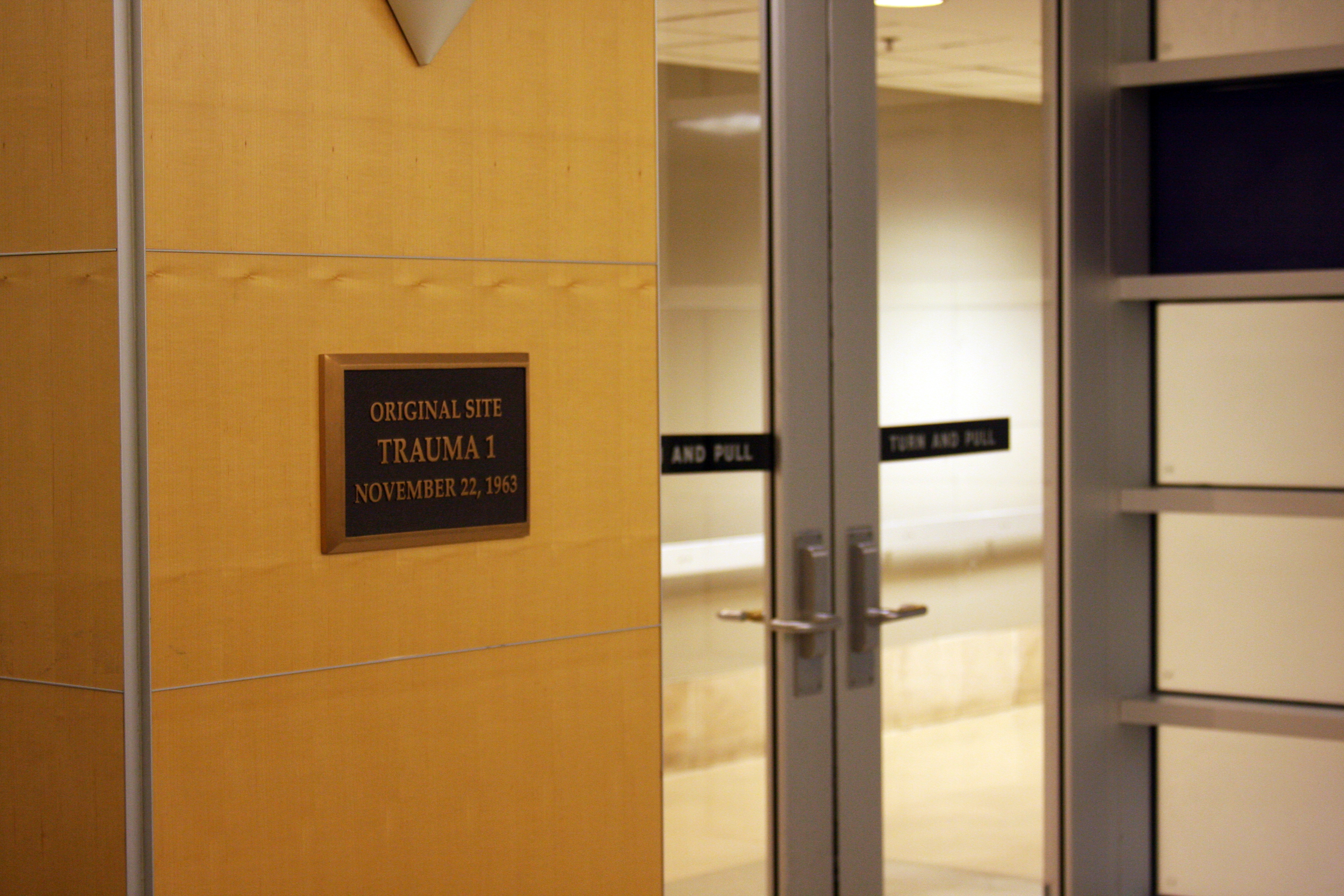
The plaque in former Parkland's Radiology Department marked the location of Trauma Room I in 1963. This is where JFK was administered the last rites and pronounced dead.

Parkland Hospital is best known as the hospital where three individuals associated with the assassination of President John F. Kennedy either died or were pronounced dead: President Kennedy himself; his assassin Lee Harvey Oswald; and Jack Ruby who killed Oswald. The 2013 film Parkland dramatizes the deaths of Kennedy and Oswald in the hospital.

After he was shot on November 22, 1963, President Kennedy was rushed to Parkland, where he was pronounced dead at 1:00 p.m. in Trauma Room 1, thirty minutes after he was shot at Dealey Plaza. At the same time, Texas governor John Connally, wounded in the same shooting, was treated in Trauma Room 2, and survived. Two days after the assassination, November 24, Oswald was rushed to Parkland after being shot in the abdomen by Ruby and died in operating room #5 after over ninety minutes of surgery. Ruby died on January 3, 1967, in the same emergency department, from a pulmonary embolism associated with lung cancer.

Since Ruby's death in 1967, areas in the former Parkland Hospital where Kennedy was pronounced dead and Oswald was operated on had been remodeled. A plaque there marked the location where Trauma Room 1 was previously in the prior Parkland, and then became a corridor in the hospital's radiology department. The ambulance entry remained in roughly the same location. The site of Trauma Room 1 was renovated several times since 1963. Trauma Room 1 was dismantled for renovation in 1973; all building materials and equipment from the room were retained by the government and remain in archival storage today. Parkland's JFK history is noted on a wall at the new hospital and at the John F. Kennedy Park for Hope, Healing and Heroes memorial on campus.

=== New third hospital campus location 2015 to present date ===
Parkland's high volume of patients led to the decision by the Dallas County Commissioners Court to propose replacing the overcrowded, 50+-year-old building with a new 1,700,000-square-foot (160,000 m^{2}), 17-story, 862-bed facility, along with a new 380,000-square-foot (35,000 m^{2}) outpatient center, a 275,000-square-foot (25,500 m^{2}) office facility, and parking for 6,000 cars. The total cost would be $1.27 billion, to be paid for through three avenues: 1) a $747 million bond proposition (contingent on voter approval, which was obtained in November 2008), 2) $350 million of cash from current and future operations, and 3) $150 million from private donations.

The board approved nearly $100 million in contracts and hired two architectural firms – HDR, Inc. (based in Omaha, Nebraska, but operates a large practice in Dallas) and Corgan (based in Dallas) – to design the new building. (A parking garage was completed as a design/build project by The Whiting-Turner Contracting Company and the architecture firm of Omniplan in January 2012.) In addition to Dallas County taxpayers funding the public hospital, large private donations were made as well, over the next five years; one major donation of $1 million was made by the Bank of America Charitable Foundation. Donors have their names permanently etched in glass panels in the two-story, glass atrium main lobby.

One major feature of the new facility is that movements of staff and supplies are handled in separate corridors and elevators from those used by patients and visitors.

The formal groundbreaking ceremony was held in October 2010; the facility was officially dedicated in March 2015, with all patients and staff officially occupying the facility that August. On August 20, 2015, Parkland opened a new emergency department and began accepting patients; construction had commenced in 2010. Staff members and patients were transferred throughout the next few days, from 5201 Harry Hines Boulevard to the new hospital located across the street at 5200 Harry Hines Boulevard. The new hospital welcomed its first birth, a boy delivered by Caesarean section, that same morning.

The new facility is immediately across Harry Hines Boulevard from the former hospital complex and is served by the Trinity Railway Express at Medical/Market Center Station and the Southwestern Medical District/Parkland station of DART light rail, which opened in December 2010.

== Awards and recognition ==
Parkland has been recognized by the American Hospital Association as one of the nation's Most Wired™ Hospitals for excellence in using technology to fill gaps in care and partner with patients on health. The hospital received this recognition 2014–2017 and 2020.

Parkland was awarded The Joint Commission's Gold Seal of Approval® and the American Heart Association/American Stroke Association's Heart-Check mark in 2017 for Advanced Certification for Comprehensive Stroke Centers.

In 2017, Parkland Health & Hospital System was recognized as a Top Performer in LGBT Healthcare Equality by the Human Rights Campaign (HRC) Foundation, the educational arm of the country's largest lesbian, gay, bisexual and transgender (LGBT) civil rights organization. Parkland earned top marks in meeting non-discrimination and training criteria that demonstrate its commitment to equitable, inclusive care for LGBT patients and their families.

Parkland's main campus is currently the largest ENERGY STAR® certified healthcare campus in the U.S., with over 3.1 million square feet of space recognized by this certification. In addition, the campus has six LEED Gold certified buildings, the first of which was awarded in 2013, that employ water reclamation, solar energy, and native landscaping. Parkland is also the second largest adopter of renewable energy in the Texas healthcare sector, earning the hospital recognition in the Environmental Protection Agency's Green Power Partnership.

In 2024, Parkland received The Joint Commission’s Sustainable Healthcare Certification (SHC) by prioritizing environmental sustainability and decarbonization.

== Leadership ==
In May 2017, Fred Cerise, MD, MPH, president and CEO of Parkland Health & Hospital System was appointed by the U.S. Comptroller General to the Medicaid and CHIP Payment and Access Commission (MACPAC). As a member of the commission, Dr. Cerise serves as a national advisor to Congress on issues affecting Medicaid and CHIP.

== Parkland Trauma Department ==
In 2016, the staff of Parkland's Rees-Jones Trauma Center began an initiative to teach classes to the community members so that they can learn how to recognize life-threatening bleeding and administer appropriate medical treatment before professional rescuers arrive. Parkland "Stop the Bleed" classes have been adapted from courses including the U.S. Military's Tactical combat Casualty Care Guidelines and the Prehospital Trauma Life Support (PHTLS) course and a part of a large U.S. Government effort to make "Stop the Bleed" training the CPR of the 21st century.

The staff of Parkland Memorial Hospital's Emergency Department and Rees-Jones Trauma Center received the 2016 Texas Preparedness Leadership Award for "Outstanding Service in Response to the 2016 Dallas Police Shootings." The award was presented at the 2016 Preparedness Coalition Symposium held Oct. 12–14 in Galveston.

== Capabilities ==
Parkland is the Dallas County public hospital; funds are primarily provided by a specially designated property tax on Dallas County residents.

Parkland serves as one of Dallas's five Level I Trauma Centers (alongside Baylor University Medical Center, Methodist Dallas Medical Center, Texas Health Presbyterian Hospital Dallas, and Children's Medical Center), a primary care center for Dallas County residents, and (along with UT Southwestern) as a medical and surgical referral center for North Texas and parts of Southern Oklahoma. Thus, virtually all medical and surgical subspecialties are represented—which makes Parkland a destination for post-graduate medical training. The Parkland Burn Center, one of the largest civilian burn units in the U.S., is famous for the Parkland Formula for fluid resuscitation, developed by Charles R. Baxter in the 1960s. The fame of the Parkland Formula is due to its being one of the first treatments for burn that included rehydration and electrolytic management.

Parkland ranks among the largest teaching hospitals in the nation. Texas Woman's University began its Bachelor of Science nursing program at Parkland in 1954 and it is still located within walking distance of the Parkland campus. Parkland also serves as the major teaching hospital of the adjacent University of Texas Southwestern Medical Center.

It has the distinction of delivering more infants under one roof than any other hospital in the nation, averaging 15–16,000 deliveries per year. Parkland Memorial has eleven prenatal clinics and employs 72 doctors training to become obstetricians-gynecologists and 45 nurse-midwives. In 2005, the staff delivered 15,590 babies, an average of more than 42 infants per day. Parkland created one of the first high-risk antenatal units in the nation and had the first neonatal intensive care unit in North Texas.

Parkland has approximately 240,000 emergency visits a year, for the co-located main emergency department (153,915 visits in 2013), and the urgent care unit (60,013 visits in 2013).

Parkland is also the base for Biotel, the medical direction system used by Dallas Fire-Rescue as well as fourteen other emergency medical service agencies in the Metroplex.

== Hatcher Station Health Center ==
In May, 2014, a new 44,300-square-foot, Parkland Health & Hospital System-affiliated outpatient clinic near Fair Park began construction on a 7-acre site adjacent to DART's Hatcher Station. The $19.8 million clinic, which was designed by BOKA Powell for Frazier Revitalization Inc. and Parkland Health & Hospital System, serves geriatric and behavioral health patients, along with adults, women, children, and infants. It also provides on-site diagnostic imaging and lab services. Exam rooms feature flexible equipment setups, and an on-site conference facility accommodates education and wellness programs. The clinic, officially named Hatcher Station Health Center, opened on May 19, 2015.

== See also ==
- List of hospitals in Texas
- National Register of Historic Places listings in Dallas County, Texas
- List of Dallas Landmarks
- John Peter Smith Hospital
