= Total body surface area =

Measure of skin area affected by an ailment

Total body surface area (TBSA) is an assessment of injury to or disease of the skin, such as burns or psoriasis.

In adults, the Wallace rule of nines can be used to determine the total percentage of area burned for each major section of the body.

In burn cases that involve partial body areas, or when dermatologists are evaluating the Psoriasis Area and Severity Index (PASI) score, the patient's palm can serve a reference point roughly equivalent to 1% of the body surface area.

For children and infants, the Lund and Browder chart is used to assess the burned body surface area. Different percentages are used because the ratio of the combined surface area of the head and neck to the surface area of the limbs is typically larger in children than that of an adult.

Typical values for common groups of humans follow. (Due to rounding, values may not add to 100%.)

Adult
Anatomic structure	Surface area
Anterior head	4.5%
Posterior head	4.5%
Anterior torso	18%
Posterior torso	18%
Anterior leg, each	9%
Posterior leg, each	9%
Anterior arm, each	4.5%
Posterior arm, each	4.5%
Genitalia/perineum	1%

Child
Anatomic structure	Surface area
Anterior head	9%
Posterior head	9%
Anterior torso	18%
Posterior torso	18%
Anterior leg, each	6.75%
Posterior leg, each	6.75%
Anterior arm, each	4.5%
Posterior arm, each	4.5%
Genitalia/perineum	1%

Adult, obese >80 kg
Anatomic structure	Surface area
Head and neck	2%
Anterior torso	25%
Posterior torso	25%
Leg, each	20%
Arm, each	5%
Genitalia/perineum	0%

Infant <10 kg
Anatomic structure	Surface area
Head and neck	20%
Anterior torso	16%
Posterior torso	16%
Leg, each	16%
Arm, each	8%
Genitalia/perineum	1%

== See also ==
- Body surface area
