= Parkland, Philadelphia =

Coordinates: 39.9891°N 75.1948°W

- Neighborhood of Philadelphia
- Location within Philadelphia
- Country: United States
- State: Pennsylvania
- County: Philadelphia
- City: Philadelphia
- Postal code: 19132
- Area code: 215

Parkland is a section of Philadelphia, Pennsylvania, United States which follows the Schuylkill River. It contains many of Philadelphia's major parks and encompasses a portion of Northwest Philadelphia. Fairmount Park and Wissahickon Valley Park are located in this section.

== Demographics ==
Parkland has a very low permanent population. As of March 2018, there were 1,278 residents.
