= Bangour General Hospital =

- Shown in Dechmont, West Lothian

Geography
- Location: Dechmont, West Lothian, Scotland
- Coordinates: 55°55′25″N 3°33′00″W

Organisation
- Care system: NHS
- Type: District General and Specialist
- Affiliated university: University of Edinburgh

History
- Founded: 1941
- Closed: 1990

Links
- Lists: Hospitals in Scotland

Bangour General Hospital was a hospital just west of the village of Dechmont, West Lothian, Scotland. It had its origins during the Second World War when hospital bed numbers in Scotland were greatly expanded to deal with the anticipated increase in civilian and military war casualties. The Emergency Hospital Service (Scotland) scheme resulted in seven new hospitals being built, while at Bangour Village Hospital in West Lothian an annexe of five ward blocks was built and this developed into Bangour General Hospital after the war. This hospital served the population of West Lothian as a general hospital and also included a maxillo-facial unit serving the Lothian region and a burns and plastic surgery unit serving much of east Scotland, the Borders and the Highland region. The hospital services were transferred to the newly built St John's Hospital at Livingston during 1989–90, and Bangour General Hospital closed in 1990 and was subsequently demolished.

== Origins ==
During the Second World War a publicly funded programme of hospital building was carried out by the Department of Health for Scotland to deal with the anticipated increase in civilian and military war casualties. The Emergency Hospital Service (Scotland) scheme resulted in seven new hospitals being built. To further increase bed capacity in 1939 the psychiatric hospital, Bangour Village Hospital at Dechmont, West Lothian, was converted into the Edinburgh War Hospital (also known as the Bangour Military Hospital) with existing patients being transferred to hospitals elsewhere in Scotland. In 1941 the Department of Health for Scotland authorised the building of an annexe to the hospital. This consisted of five ward blocks designated 'P', 'Q', 'R', 'S' and 'T', and each block retained this designation throughout the life of the hospital. Each block consisted of eight wards, and a nurses' home was built, designated as 'K' block. The hutted blocks were intended to be used for five years but were in use for half a century.

== History ==
The hospital was initially designated the Bangour Annexe, and the first patients were admitted in 1941. Sir Henry Wade, who had served as a military surgeon in both the Boer War and the First World War, had been appointed surgical director of the Emergency Medical Service in Scotland and in that capacity was in charge of recruiting staff. When the anticipated war casualties did not materialise, the beds were used for civilian patients on the surgical waiting lists of Edinburgh hospitals. Patients with tuberculosis (TB) were transferred from elsewhere in south-east Scotland under the care of Professor Charles Cameron, and a ward block was designated for patients with bone and joint TB under the care of Mr (later Sir) Walter Mercer, who paid weekly visits to the hospital. A neurosurgical unit was set up in Bangour Military Hospital with a convalescent unit in the annexe. It was headed by Professor Norman Dott, who continued to operate there until the neurosurgical service transferred to a custom-built unit at the Western General Hospital in Edinburgh. A maxillo-facial unit and a plastic surgery and burns unit were established in T block. The lead surgeon in plastic surgery and burns was Mr A B Wallace, who had trained under Sir Harold Gillies, and Gillies as consultant plastic surgeon to the army was a regular visitor to the unit. Wallace spent his working life at Bangour and there devised the Wallace rule of nines, which he published in 1951. It is a method used to estimate the surface area involved in a burned patient and guide the volume of fluid replacement required. This work and work on the management of burns by exposure gained an international reputation for the unit.

In 1948 administration of the hospital was taken over by the National Health Service, and Bangour Annexe became Bangour General Hospital, an acute general hospital serving the population of West Lothian. Some of the ward blocks were reassigned to reflect this new role with P Block housing the general medical unit, Q Block the general surgical unit, R Block the TB unit and S Block the maternity unit, while T block continued to house plastic surgery, burns and maxillo-facial surgery. To support these a radiology department and laboratories were opened.

In 1950 a nursing school was established as Bangour Nursing College.

Further specialist units were opened, ophthalmology in 1955, ear, nose and throat in 1959 and care of the elderly in 1960. An accident and emergency department was opened in 1969 and an orthopaedic department in 1975.

== Closure and legacy ==
With the establishment of the new town of Livingston, it was logical that the new district general hospital intended to replace Bangour General Hospital should be located close to that centre of population. Most of the hospital services were transferred to the newly built St John's Hospital at Livingston in 1989, and when the plastic surgery and burns unit transferred in 1990 the hospital closed. The buildings of the former Bangour General Hospital were later demolished.

It was the subject of a book by Hendrie and Macleod, published by Aberdeen University Press in 1991.

The hospital archive is held by Lothian Health Services Archive.

== Notable staff ==
- Sir Henry Wade, Surgical Director of Emergency Medical Service (Scotland)
- Professor Norman Dott, Neurosurgeon
- Professor Walter Mercer, Orthopaedic surgeon
- A B Wallace, Plastic surgeon
- Dr Joyce Grainger, Physician.
- Professor Donald MacLeod, General surgeon
