= Alexander Burns Wallace =

Scottish plastic surgeon

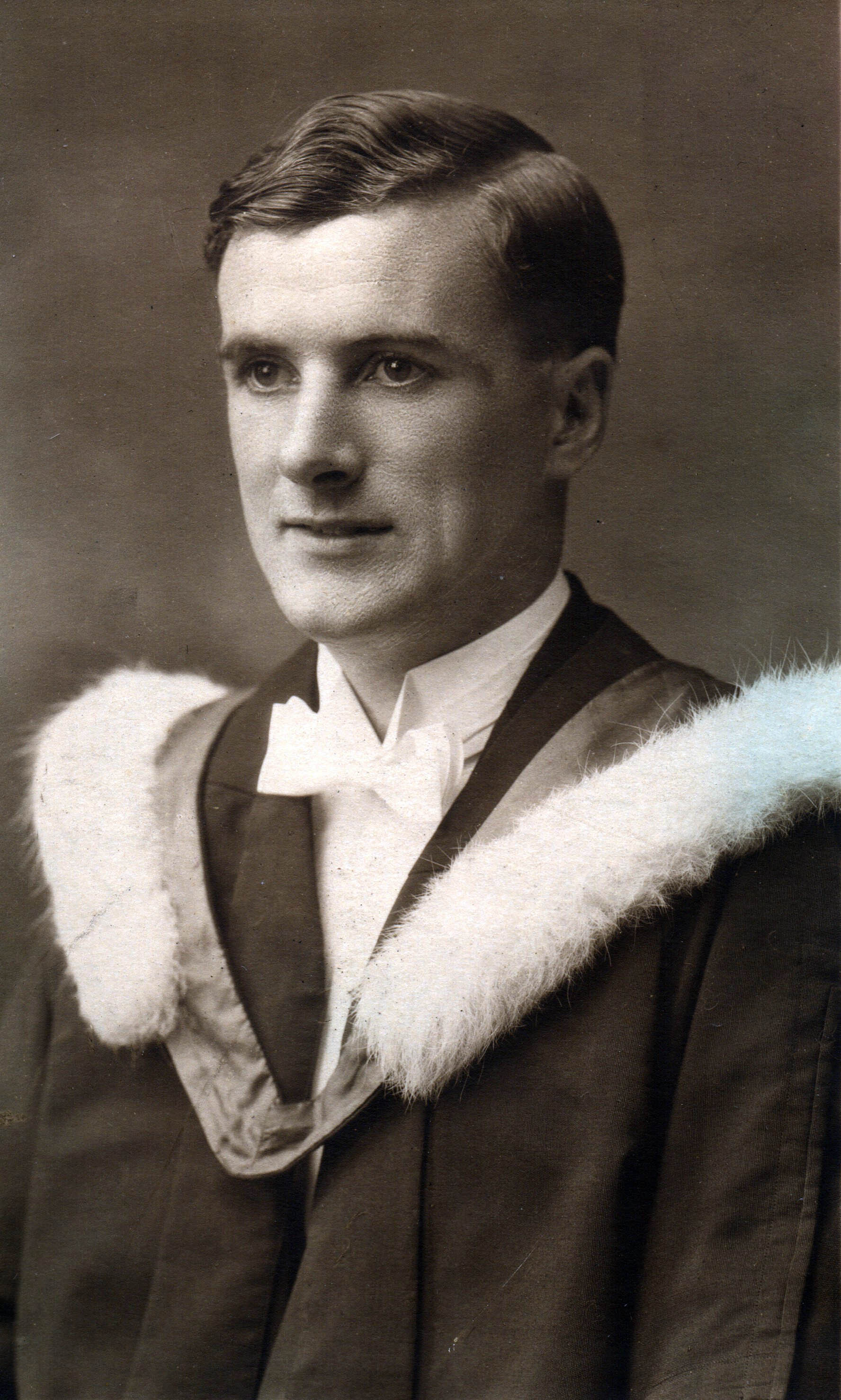
1929 University of Edinburgh MB ChB graduation portrait of A.B. Wallace.

Alexander Burns Wallace CBE FRSE FRCSE (1906–1974) was a Scottish plastic surgeon. He was a founding member and president (1951) of the British Association of Plastic Surgeons, and the first editor of the British Journal of Plastic Surgery. In authorship he appears as A. B. Wallace.

== Life ==
He was born in Edinburgh in 1906, the son of Alexander Wallace and his wife, Christina Bishop.

Wallace was educated at George Heriot's School and then studied medicine at Edinburgh University, graduating with his MB ChB in 1929.

He became a Fellow of the Royal College of Surgeons of Edinburgh in 1932. Following that, he went to McGill University completing a MSc degree in lymphatics research in 1936. During World War II he served as plastic surgeon at the Scottish Emergency Medical Hospital at what became Bangour General Hospital in West Lothian. After the war he became lead surgeon in the burns and plastic surgery unit at Bangour General Hospital. In addition he had paediatric beds at the Royal Hospital for Sick Children in Edinburgh, and was Reader in Plastic Surgery at Edinburgh University from 1946 until his retirement in 1970.

In 1972 he was elected a Fellow of the Royal Society of Edinburgh. His proposers were Douglas Guthrie, Anthony Elliot Ritchie, Neil Campbell, and Sir Edmund Hirst.

In 1973, he was awarded a doctorate (PhD) by the University of St Andrews for his thesis entitled “Classification of Burns A History of Development: With Comments for Today and Thoughts for the Future”.

Following the closure of Bangour General Hospital where he had been the lead surgeon in burns and plastic surgery, the Wallace Burns Unit was founded in his name at the new St. John's Hospital, Livingston, which opened in 1989.

He retired to Ceres in Fife and died there on 14 December 1974, leaving a wife, son, three daughters and three granddaughters.

== Wallace Rule of Nines ==
In 1951 Wallace introduced the "Rule of Nines" in an article published in the British medical journal The Lancet:

For patients over the age of 16 years the 'Rule of Nines' indicates the percentage of skin surface area accounted for by various parts of the body. The rule estimates nine per cent for the head and each arm, 18 per cent each for lower limbs and front and back of the trunk, and 1 per cent for the perineal region. The extent of a burn is expressed as the percentage of the body surface area affected called the total burn surface area (TBSA). The TBSA is used to help calculate the volume of fluid required in the initial resuscitation of the patient. This can be calculated by the widely used Parkland Formula or the Muir and Barclay formula. TBSA is also used in the prediction of patient prognosis. In addition Wallace advocated treatment of extensive burns by exposure.

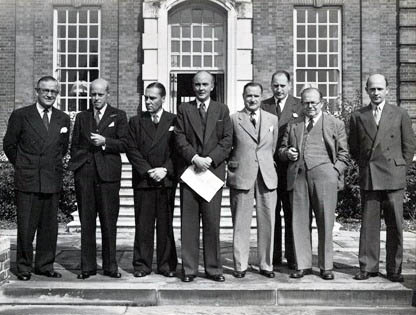
British Association of Plastic Surgeons (BAPS) Council at Roehampton, London, September 1952. From left: A H McIndoe, R Mowlem, J N Barron, R J V Battle, A B Wallace, J P Teidy, T P Kilner, J S Tough

== Selected publications ==
Wallace, A.B. The Treatment of Burns. Lord Horder. Oxford University Press. 1941.

Wallace, A.B. "The History and Evolution of Plastic Surgery." Res Medica: Journal of the Royal Medical Society. 1965.

== See also ==
- Nominative determinism - Wallace's namesake rule matches his middle name
