= Ian Muir =

Ian Muir may refer to:

- Ian Muir (English footballer) (born 1963)
- Ian Muir (Scottish footballer) (1929–2009)
- Ian Fraser Muir (1921–2008), English plastic surgeon

== See also ==
- Ian Calman Muir MacLennan, professor of immunology
