= Kumarian Press =

- Parent company: Lynne Rienner Publishers
- Founded: 1977
- Founder: Krishna Kumari Sondhi and Ian Mayo-Smith
- Headquarters location: Boulder, Colorado, U.S.
- Publication types: Books
- Official website: www.rienner.com

Kumarian Press was an independent academic publishing company established in 1977 in West Hartford, Connecticut by Krishna Kumari Sondhi and Ian Mayo-Smith. The company's name is a reference to its founders, a combination of Sondhi's middle name and Mayo Smith's first name combined.

== History ==
The company began publishing titles on management for training programs in international development, some of them written by the founders. International development remains the core of the publishing program but has expanded over the years to include books on human rights, civil society, peacebuilding, governance, gender studies, microfinance, and international health. It also distributes titles for Oxfam Great Britain, International Federation of Red Cross and Red Crescent Societies, and the United Nations Development Fund for Women. Kumarian was sold in April 2008 to Stylus Publishing and was an imprint of Stylus, located in Sterling, VA.

In April 2013, Kumarian was sold to Lynne Rienner Publishers, based in Boulder, Colorado.

Authors have included Hazel Henderson, David Hulme, David Korten, Joanna Macy, Helena Norberg-Hodge, Lester Salamon, Ian Smillie, and Peter Uvin, whose book Aiding Violence addresses development in Rwanda.
