= Fae Margaret Adams =

American medical officer (1918–2022)

- Born: June 13, 1918; San Jose, California, U.S.
- Died: December 16, 2022 (aged 104)
- Resting place: Arlington National Cemetery, Arlington County, Virginia, U.S.
- Education: University of California, Berkeley
- Occupation: Medical officer

Fae Margaret Adams (June 13, 1918 – December 16, 2022) was an American medical officer. She is best known as the first woman doctor to receive a regular US Army commission in 1953.

== Biography ==
Fae Margaret Adams was born on June 13, 1918, in San Jose, California, US.

She started studying medicine at Berkeley, but enlisted shortly afterwards and therefore did not graduate.

Adams started her career in the Women's Army Corps in 1943. She got her M.D. while under G.I rights from Woman's Medical College of Pennsylvania while serving in the army.

In 1953, she became the first female doctor to be commissioned in the Regular Army. At that time, she was 34, a First Lieutenant, and planned to specialize in gynecology and obstetrics.

She is a veteran of World War II, as well as Korean War and Vietnam War.

She died on December 16, 2022, at age 104, and is buried in Arlington National Cemetery.

== Bibliography ==
- Bouma, Angela (April 29, 2026). No Place to Stand: Gender, Discipline, and the Contradictions of Military Womanhood, 1945-1975 (Doctor of Philosophy in History (PhD) thesis). Liberty University.
- Commire, Anne (2007). Dictionary of Women Worldwide. Thomson Gale. ISBN 9780787675851.
- Golemba, Beverly E. (1992). Lesser-known women: A biographical dictionary (TXT). Lynne Rienner Publishers. ISBN 1-55587-301-4.
