= Bangor railway station =

Bangor railway station may refer to:

- Bangor railway station (Northern Ireland), the terminus of the Belfast–Bangor line in Bangor, Co. Down
- Bangor West railway station, on the Belfast–Bangor line in Bangor, Co. Down
- Bangor railway station (Wales), a station in Bangor, Gwynedd
- Bangor station (Michigan), an Amtrak station in Bangor, Michigan
- Bangor Union Station (closed 1961), in Maine

== See also ==
- Bangour railway station (closed 1921), near Edinburgh
