= Ian Scott Smillie =

British orthopaedic surgeon (1907–1992)

Ian Scott Smillie OBE FRCSEd
- Born: 15 April 1907; Dublin, Ireland
- Died: 18 March 1992 (aged 84); Blairgowrie, Perthshire, Scotland
- Education: Merchiston Castle School
- Alma mater: University of Edinburgh
- Occupation: Orthopaedic surgeon
- Known for: Presidency of the International Society of the Knee; Injuries of the knee joint

Ian Scott Smillie (15 April 1907 – 18 March 1992) was a British professor of orthopaedic surgery who became an international authority on conditions of the knee. He devised techniques and instruments to facilitate the surgical excision of the damaged knee meniscus. He was an early advocate of specialist team care in orthopaedics and of early mobilisation. His textbooks Injuries of the knee joint and Diseases of the knee Joint were widely read throughout the world. In 1981 he was elected president of the International Society of the Knee.

== Early life ==
Smillie was born in Dublin to Scottish parents. He was educated at Merchiston Castle School, Edinburgh and at the University of Edinburgh, qualifying MB ChB in 1931. After junior hospital posts in Chester and Grimsby, he became, in 1936, clinical assistant to Mr (later Sir) Walter Mercer who later became the first Professor of Orthopaedic Surgery in Edinburgh. In 1938 he was elected a member of the Harveian Society of Edinburgh. At the start of World War II Smillie was appointed surgeon in charge of the Emergency Medical Service Hospital at Larbert, Stirlingshire. Here he developed specialist team care for patients, with the teams including specialist nurses, physiotherapists and orthotists. In recognition of this wartime service, he was made an OBE in 1946.

== Career ==
Smillie had from an early stage in his career devoted himself to orthopaedic surgery. When the National Health Service (NHS) was established in 1948 he was made surgeon in charge of orthopaedics for the NHS Eastern Scotland area. He was awarded a gold medal by the University of Edinburgh for his ChM thesis. Also in 1948 he went to the United States of America and Canada as a Nuffield Travelling Fellow. He developed the orthopaedic service at Bridge of Earn Hospital and set up orthopaedic clinics at Dundee Royal Infirmary. In both centres he continued to promote and develop the concept of team care in orthopaedics and emphasised the importance of rehabilitation.

In 1967 he became the first Professor of Orthopaedic Surgery at the University of St Andrews transferring to the University of Dundee when the bulk of the medical school moved there. Smillie was regarded as an excellent technical surgeon and an inspiring teacher. He became an influential authority on knee conditions. His book Injuries of the knee joint, first published in 1946, became widely read throughout the English-speaking world and was to be published in five English language editions and a Spanish edition. Diseases of the knee Joint, first published in 1974 went to three editions and was also published in Spanish. Smillie was an enthusiastic advocate of removal of the injured meniscus and developed instruments and techniques to facilitate this procedure. From the 1980s advances in technology and understanding of the adverse consequences of meniscectomy led to a more conservative approach being adopted. In 1981 Smillie was elected president of the International Society of the Knee.

== Leisure pursuits ==
Smillie had a wide range of leisure pursuits. In the 1930s he took part in car racing at the Brookland's circuit. In later life he bought and farmed an estate in Perthshire. He was an enthusiastic salmon fisherman and his interest in deer stalking led to his writing A Guide to the Stalking of Red Deer in Scotland.

== Family ==
Smillie married Delicia Ash in 1941. They had two daughters. In 1956 he married Janet Bissett.

== Legacy ==
The Ian Smillie award is presented each year by the University of Dundee to the most distinguished student on the Master of Orthopaedic and Trauma Surgery (ChM Orth) course.

The streets Smillie Place, Bridge of Earn and Smillie Court, Dundee are named for him.

== Selected publications ==
- Diseases of the knee Joint
- Injuries of the knee joint
- A Guide to the Stalking of Red Deer in Scotland
