= Peter Uvin =

American political scientist (born 1962)

- Born: 1962 (age 63–64); Belgium
- Education: Ghent University; University of Geneva/Graduate Institute of International Studies
- Occupation: Political scientist
- Employer: Claremont McKenna College

Peter Uvin (born 1962) is a Belgian-born American political scientist. He is a professor of government at Claremont McKenna College. He was the vice president for academic affairs and dean of faculty. He resigned that position on 28 August 2020. He is the author of four books, including Aiding Violence: The Development Enterprise in Rwanda, which won the Herskovits Prize of the African Studies Association in 1999.

== Education and career ==
Uvin earned a licentiate in diplomatic science from the University of Ghent in 1984, and a second licentiate in political science from the same university in 1985. After studying at the Stockholm University, he earned a PhD in political science at the University of Geneva's Graduate Institute of International Studies in 1991. After several visiting positions he joined Brown University as Joukowsky Family Assistant Professor in 1994. Uvin became Henry Leir Professor in Humanitarian Studies at Tufts University in 2000, and academic dean of the Fletcher School of Law and Diplomacy at Tufts from 2007 to 2013. He was a Guggenheim Fellow in 2006. In 2013 he was hired by Amherst College as its first provost. He moved again to Claremont McKenna in 2015.

== Books ==
Uvin is the author of:

- The International Organization of Hunger (Kegen Paul International, 1994)
- Aiding Violence: The Development Enterprise in Rwanda (Kumarian Press, 1998)
- Human Rights and Development (Kumarian Press, 2004)
- Life After Violence: A People's Story of Burundi (Zed Books, 2013)
