= Henry Wade (surgeon) =

Scottish military and urological surgeon

Sir Henry Wade CMG DSO
- Born: 18 December 1876; Falkirk, Scotland
- Died: 21 February 1955 (aged 78); Edinburgh, Scotland
- Education: Royal High School, Edinburgh
- Alma mater: University of Edinburgh
- Scientific career
- Fields: Surgery, Urology
- Institutions: Leith Hospital, Royal Infirmary of Edinburgh
- Thesis: A contribution to the problem of cancer research based upon the results of an experimental investigation of infective sarcome of the dog

Sir Henry Wade PRCSE FRSE DSO CMG (18 December 1876 – 21 February 1955) was a Scottish military and urological surgeon. He was elected president of the Royal College of Surgeons of Edinburgh in 1935. His collection of anatomical specimens (mainly kidneys and bladders) was donated to Surgeon's Hall in Edinburgh and is known as the Henry Wade Collection.

== Early life and education ==
Wade was born in Falkirk in central Scotland, the son of Rev George Wade, minister of the Falkirk West United Presbyterian Church.

From the Royal High School of Edinburgh, he went on to study medicine at the University of Edinburgh, graduating MB, ChB with honours in 1898. In September 1899, he was appointed house physician under Sir Thomas Fraser at the Royal Infirmary of Edinburgh.

== Early career ==
In 1900, in response to a national call for volunteer doctors to serve in the Boer War, Wade enlisted as a civilian surgeon and was posted to join the Royal Scots Fusiliers at the 1st General Hospital in Wynberg. He went on to serve at the 1st General Hospital, Pretoria, South Africa. He was awarded the Queen's Medal with four clasps. On his return home after two years, Wade became clinical tutor under Professor Francis Mitchell Caird, Professor of Clinical Surgery at Edinburgh University. At the same time, he was appointed as a demonstrator in anatomy and then pathology at the University of Edinburgh. In 1903, he was appointed museum conservator at the Royal College of Surgeons of Edinburgh and became a fellow of the college.

He joined Ford Robertson, pathologist to the Edinburgh Asylums Laboratory, situated at that time in the Royal College of Surgeons of Edinburgh. They investigated the hypothesis that cancer might be a microbial disease by examining sections of human cancers using metallic impregnation techniques. Robertson and Wade demonstrated bacteria in these sections and mistakenly concluded that these were 'the determining factor' in causing cancer. Their publication provoked national debate and their conclusions were rebuked in a Lancet editorial.

Wade went on to undertake a study transplanting canine sarcoma into dogs, rabbits, and foxes. He based his MD thesis on this research and was awarded the degree with gold medal in 1907.

== Later life ==
Wade developed an interest in prostatic disease, preparing serial whole sections through the cadaveric prostate in various stages of obstruction. He soon established an international reputation for his work, forming a close collaboration with pioneering urologist Professor Hugh H. Young (1870–1945) of Baltimore, whom he visited in 1920. He was appointed surgeon to Leith Hospital in 1909, where he practised as a general surgeon. By refusing to amputate the fractured leg of 16-year-old Norman Dott, at that time an engineering apprentice, Wade enabled Dott to pursue a surgical career, and so determined the future career of a famous neurosurgeon. He performed a successful early bone graft, excising a bony tumour from the humerus of a young man and restored bone continuity by grafting bone from the femur of another patient.

== Service in World War I ==
In September 1914, Wade was commissioned as a captain in the Field Ambulance of the Scottish Horse Mounted Brigade. During initial training at Morpeth, he designed a mobile operating car, to "take the surgeon to the wounded". In 1915, his unit sailed to join the Gallipoli Campaign, and Wade operated using his mobile operating car at Suvla Bay. When Gallipoli was evacuated, Wade sailed with the Egyptian Expeditionary Force to Cairo. Here, he treated endemic infections such as malaria and schistosomiasis, to which the troops of the force were vulnerable. Wade took 400 photographs of the Mediterranean and Palestinian campaigns. He wrote a moving tribute, The Flowers of the Forest, to the 58 Edinburgh students and doctors who enlisted with him in 1914.

In Palestine, Wade observed that many fatalities among the wounded resulted from surgical shock caused by the long journeys to base hospitals. Fellow medical officers and he encouraged the adoption of the Thomas splint and persuaded General Allenby to authorise its mass production. Aberdeen surgeon Sir Henry Gray, a leading advocate of the splint, believed that the use of the Thomas splint reduced the fatality rate from gunshot fracture of the femur from around 80% to 15.6% in casualty clearing stations in 1917. However, casualties from infectious diseases exceeded those caused by war wounds. Wade became consultant surgeon in 1916, and commanded a surgical division. By the time of his demobilisation in 1919, he had been twice mentioned in dispatches and was made a Companion of the Order of St Michael and St George (CMG). He had already been awarded the Distinguished Service Order and the Order of the White Eagle of Serbia.

== Urological surgeon ==
Returning to Edinburgh, he began to develop facilities for urological surgery. He treated patients with tuberculosis of the urinary tract and those with renal and bladder cancer. He adopted the relatively new radiological technique of contrast pyelography, and in the Edinburgh Royal Infirmary, he developed a dedicated X-ray diagnostic theatre in which this could be performed under general anaesthesia. Some 35 original papers derived from this work.

With his friend and colleague David Wilkie, he established a large private practice in Drumsheugh Gardens, Edinburgh.

Shortly after World War II broke out, Wade retired from his appointments and as a consulting surgeon, but he continued as a visiting surgeon for the Emergency Medical Service Hospital at Bangour Hospital in West Lothian.

== Honours ==
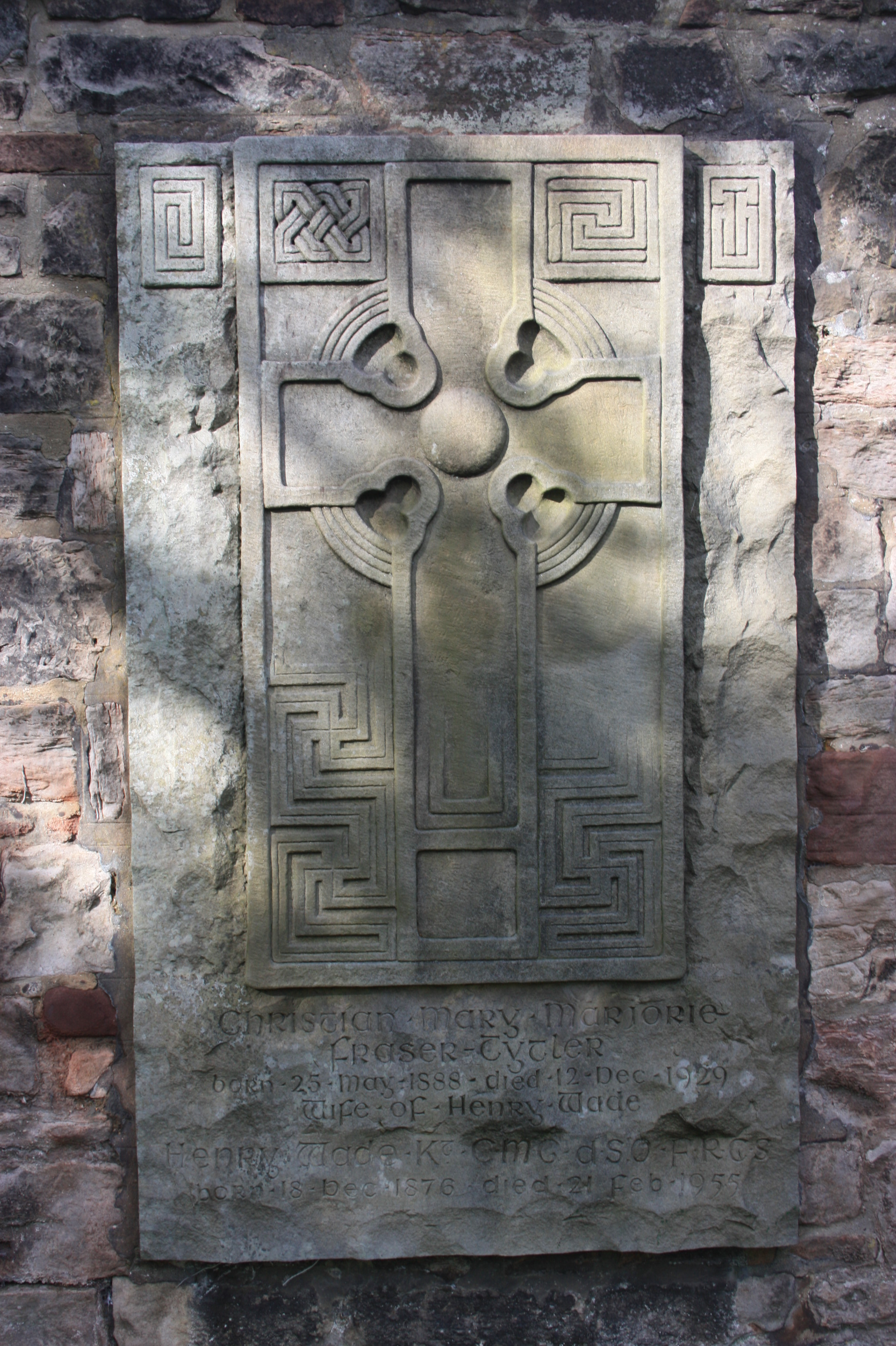
The grave of Sir Henry Wade, Dean Cemetery, Edinburgh

In 1904 Wade was elected a member of the Harveian Society of Edinburgh and served as President in 1938. In 1932, he was elected a fellow of the Royal Society of Edinburgh. His proposers were Arthur Logan Turner, James Watt, David Wilkie, and Edward Albert Sharpey-Schafer. In 1932 he was also elected a member of the Aesculapian Club.

His contributions to urological surgery were recognised in 1932 when he gave the Ramon Guiteras lecture, and by his 1937 presidency of the section of Urological Surgery of the Royal Society of Medicine. He was elected president of the Royal College of Surgeons of Edinburgh in 1935. He was elected honorary fellow of the Royal College of Surgeons of England, the Royal College of Surgeons in Ireland, the Royal Australasian College of Surgeons, and the American College of Surgeons. Wade was knighted in 1946.

== Marriage ==
On 15 September 1924, Wade married Christian Mary Marjorie Fraser-Tytler of Woodhouselee. She was a descendant of Alexander Fraser Tytler, Lord Woodhouselee.

She died suddenly on 12 December 1929, a week after a straightforward operation, performed by David Wilkie, to remove a uterine fibroid. She was presumed to have had a massive pulmonary embolism. They had no children.

== Death ==
Sir Henry Wade died in Edinburgh on 21 February 1955 aged 78 years. He is buried with his wife in the 20th century north extension to Dean Cemetery in western Edinburgh. The grave lies on the north wall close to the main entrance.

== Publications ==
1. Wade, Henry (1908), "An experimental investigation of infective sarcoma of the dog, with a consideration of its relationship to cancer", Journal of Pathology and Bacteriology, 12 (2): 384–425, doi:10.1002/path.1700120221
2. Wade, Henry (1914), "Prostatism", Annals of Surgery, 37 (5): 321–359, doi:10.1097/00000658-191403000-00001, PMC 1406442, PMID 17863152
3. Wade, Henry (1920), "Report of patient six years after the implantation of a homoplastic bone graft", Edinburgh Medical Journal: 2–4
4. Wade, Henry (1932), "The balanced urinary system (The Ramon Guiteras Lecture)", Journal of Urology, 28 (4): 381–403, doi:10.1016/s0022-5347(17)72671-7
5. Wade, Henry (1949), "The Barber Surgeons of Edinburgh (The Vicary Lecture)", Annals of the Royal College of Surgeons of England (5): 353–366
