= Borders General Hospital =

- NHS Borders
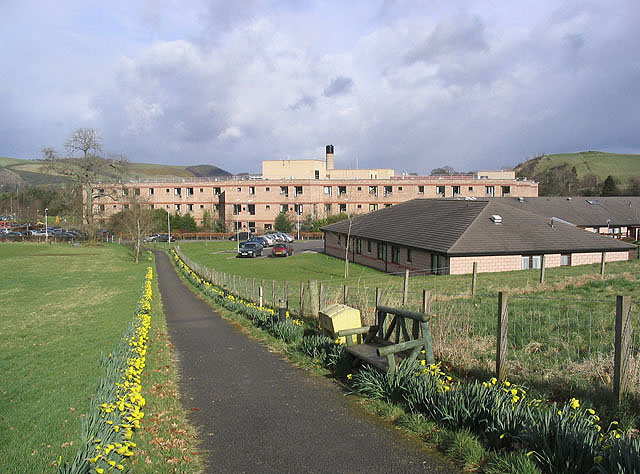

- Shown in the Scottish Borders

Geography
- Location: Melrose, Scottish Borders, Scotland
- Coordinates: 55°35′44″N 2°44′31″W

Organisation
- Care system: NHS Scotland
- Type: General

Services
- Emergency department: Yes
- Beds: 328

History
- Founded: 1988

Links
- Website: www.nhsborders.scot.nhs.uk/patients-and-visitors/our-services/hospitals/borders-general-hospital/

Borders General Hospital (BGH) is a district general hospital on the outskirts of Melrose, Scotland. It is managed by NHS Borders.

== History ==
The hospital was commissioned to replace the ageing Peel Hospital at Caddonfoot near Galashiels. The South-East Regional Hospital Board approved plans for a new 375-bed hospital at the Huntlyburn site in 1986. The new hospital was designed by Reiach & Hall and built by John Laing & Son and was officially opened by the Queen in 1988.

The Planned Surgical Admissions Unit opened in March 2011, affording patients a more suitable environment for routine surgical procedures. The renal dialysis unit benefited from a major upgrade in June 2011 which included an increase in the number of dialysis machines from six to twelve.

In January 2013 the Margaret Kerr Unit opened, providing dedicated palliative care facilities. The development provided a dedicated entrance, accommodation for patients and several large sun lounges. In March 2013 refurbishment to the stroke unit was completed. As part of a new outpatients department a new audiology suite opened in August 2013.

== Services ==
It is the main hospital in the Scottish Borders and has an accident and emergency department and a Macmillan Cancer Unit.

== Transport ==
The Borders General Hospital is accessible via the A6091 road, which links the A7 and the A68, known colloquially as the Melrose Bypass. It is roughly five minutes from the town of Galashiels and two minutes from the small town of Melrose via Chiefswood Road and is served by buses from all Border towns run by Borders Buses.

== Sources ==
- Ritchie, Berry (1997). The Good Builder: The John Laing Story. James & James.
