= Peel Hospital =

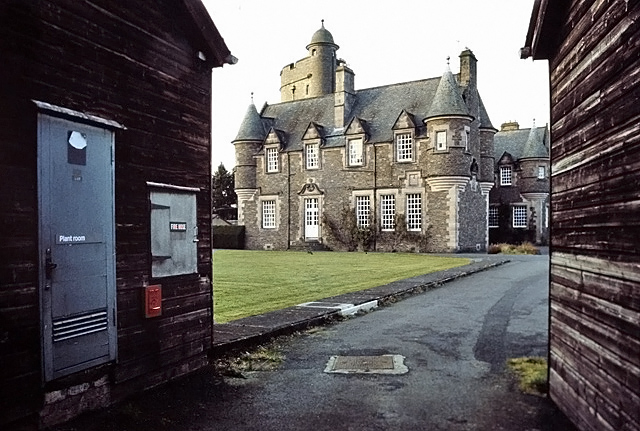
- Peel House with the wooden huts on either side of the house

- Location of the hospital in the Scottish Borders

Geography
- Location: Caddonfoot, Scottish Borders, Scotland
- Coordinates: 55.6035°N 2.9019°W

Organisation
- Care system: NHS
- Type: General hospital

History
- Founded: 1939
- Closed: 1988

Links
- Lists: Hospitals in Scotland

Peel Hospital was a health facility at Caddonfoot in the Scottish Borders, Scotland. It is a Category A Listed Building.

== History ==
Peel House was designed by John Kinross and completed in 1904. In 1939, Peel Hospital was established as one of seven Emergency Hospital Service facilities for military casualties when Peel House was requisitioned from Lord Craigmyle. The wooden huts which had been erected during the war continued to be used for civilian purposes after the war. Additions included an administration block in 1949, a new operating theatre in 1957 and a new out‑patients facility in 1969. After services transferred to Borders General Hospital the hospital closed in 1988.
