= Luther Atwood =

American chemist

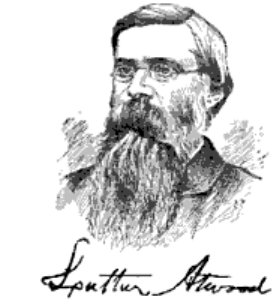
Atwood in 1868

Luther Atwood (November 7, 1820 – November 5, 1868) was an American chemist. He is known for creating new chemical products from the distillation of coal and petroleum.

== Early life ==
Atwood was born at Bristol, New Hampshire on November 7, 1820. He was the eldest son of Jonathan and Huldah (Gurdy) Atwood, of English descent. His earliest American paternal ancestor was from Sanderstead, England. That ancestor emigrated to America in the 1640s and settled in Boston.

== Mid life ==
Atwood was educated at the New Hampton Academy in that city of the state of New Hampshire. After graduating he taught at the school for a year. During this time Atwood took up an interest in chemistry and first experimented with a still in which he made a peppermint oil extract. He sold the product in Boston.

== Career ==
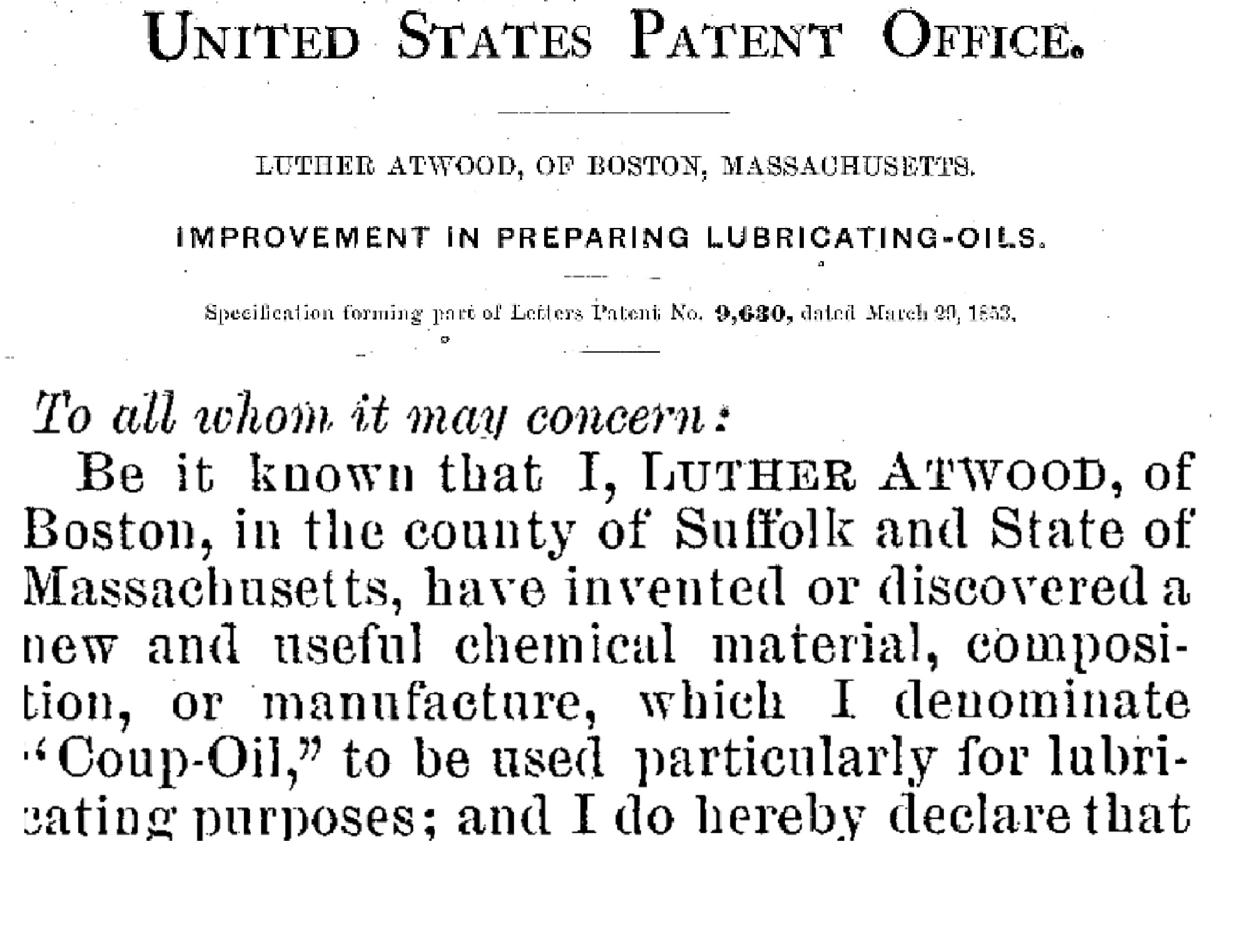
"Coup oil" – Patent No. US9630A

Atwood became an employee of Philbrick & Trafton, chemical manufacturers of Boston in 1849. A year or so later the firm was reestablished as Philbrick, Carpenter, and Company. Atwood became a partner of this new company located at Waltham, Massachusetts. They manufactured products that were distilled from coal tar. Atwood invented "coup oil" in 1852, which was the first oil extracted from coal. Atwood's "coup oil", a product of coal tar, picric acid and benzole, was used as a machinery lubricant especially in the railroad industry and factories. The company located at Waltham, Massachusetts made 175,000 gallons of the lubricant before it was discontinued in 1859.

"Coup Oil" was named by Atwood after the coup d'état that had just been carried out by Louis Napoleon, who became Emperor of France in 1852. The odor of this new oil extract was repulsive and disagreeable. Because of this he lost interest in his new oil extract invention.

Atwood then decided to distill and refine "Canada pitch" which was obtained from petroleum overflows around Petrolia, Ontario in Canada. He refined the oil to obtain light and heavy oils. He refined the light oils to a water-white burning oil. The heavy oils he refined to a quality grade of paraffine lubricating oil. From the paraffine oil he obtained a solid white paraffine, which melted at about 130 °F (54 °C).

"Canada pitch" was of a limited supply so Atwood experimented with gas coals of the Ohio valley, the albertite of New Brunswick, the boghead mineral from Scotland, Trinidad pitch, and petroleum. He visited France and Germany in 1854, 1855, and 1856 for the oil industry. He became superintendent of the Glasgow oil works in Scotland, Geary Miller & Company, where the boghead mineral was being processed under the Scottish chemist James Young. The oils made by Young, known as "Bathgate naphtha", possessed an odor that was disagreeable to most people, resulting in a prejudice against paraffine oils. Atwood succeeded in refining his process to produce an oil that was colorless, odorless and burned in lamp wicks with brilliancy.

Atwood went to New York in 1858 and became chemist of the Queens County Oil Works at Blissville in Long Island City in New York. In that year Atwood invented the "meerschaum process" for the distillation of coal and patented the "tobacco pipe still" or retort. This consisted of an open kiln of masonry, holding from twenty-five to one hundred tons of coal or shale, which was fired from the top. A canal led to a condenser at the bottom. a jet of steam provided a downward draught providing distillation of coal. Another process known as a "cracker patent" was invented by Atwood in 1860. Atwood and his brother William received gold medals from New York state and Pennsylvania. The patents were highly important at first, but became worthless by the development of petroleum oil wells in Pennsylvania.

Atwood became chemist and superintendent of the Union Coal and Oil Company of Maysville, Kentucky in 1866. This company owned a coal mine at Cannelton, West Virginia. The coal was distilled in retorts at the mine and the crude oil obtained was carried to Maysville. There the crude was refined and lubricating oil was the main product.

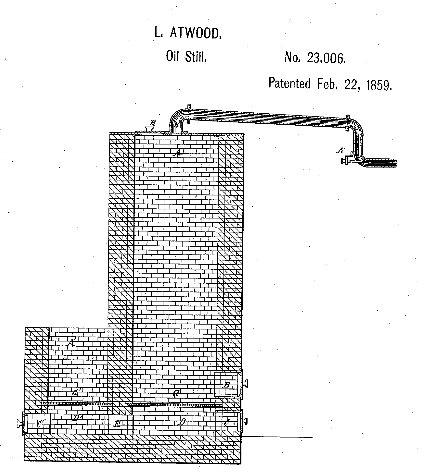
Atwood oil still patent No. 23,006

== Patents ==
- 1853 – "Improvement in preparing lubricating-oils" US9630 A = "Coup oil"
- 1853 – Improvement in processes for purifying alcohol US 9951 A
- 1859 – "Improvement in apparatus for destructive distillation" US 23337 A
- 1860 – "Improvement in construction of apparatus for the redistillation of coal-oils" US 28246 A

== Family ==
Atwood was married in Waltham, Massachusetts on 1 January 1857 to Catherine Lucy, daughter of Thomas J. Marsh. They had three children whose names were Charles E., Luther and Isabelle L. Atwood.

== Death ==
Atwood died at Cape Elizabeth, Maine on 5 November 1868.

== Sources ==
- Derby, George (1906). The National Cyclopedia of American Biography ... V.1-. J. T. White. "He also invented a process of manufacturing " coup oil " which was the first oil extracted from coal, being a product of coal tar, picric acid and benzole."
- Kane, Joseph Nathan (1997). Famous First Facts, Fifth Edition. The H. W. Wilson Company. ISBN 0-8242-0930-3. "The first coal oil factory to manufacture coal oil from coal tar was started in 1853 by the U.S. Chemical Manufacturing Company in Waltham, MA. The light fractions from this coal oil distillation were called coal oil, and used for illuminating purposes. The oil made in connection with picric acid, benzol, and other products from coal tar was named Coup Oil by Luther Atwood, the inventor. When Edwin Drake demonstrated, in 1859, that petroleum could be secured by drilling, the coal oil industry died a natural death."
- White (1891). The National Cyclopaedia of American Biography: Being the History of the United States as Illustrated in the Lives of the Founders, Builders, and Defenders of the Republic, and of the Men and Women who are Doing the Work and Moulding the Thought of the Present Time. J. T. White.
