= Bridge of Earn Hospital =

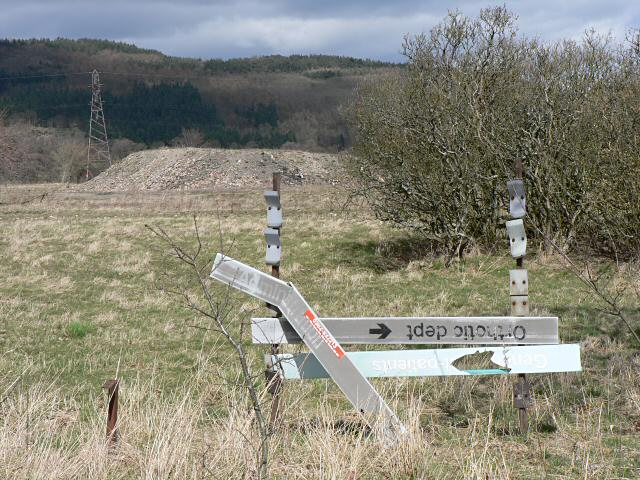
- The remains of the hospital

- Shown in Perth and Kinross

Geography
- Location: Bridge of Earn, Perth and Kinross, Scotland, United Kingdom
- Coordinates: 56.3459°N 3.3916°W

Organisation
- Care system: Public NHS
- Type: District General

History
- Founded: 1939
- Closed: 1992

Links
- Lists: Hospitals in Scotland

The Bridge of Earn Hospital was a health facility in Bridge of Earn, Perth and Kinross, Scotland.

== History ==
The facility was designed as one of seven Emergency Hospital Service facilities and opened in 1939. It accommodated evacuees from other hospitals as well as some injured German prisoners of war during the Second World War. Patients were transferred from the rehabilitation unit at Gleneagles Hotel in 1946 and from the orthopedic unit at Larbert in 1947. It became part of the National Health Service in 1948.and functioned as a large general hospital with general medical, general surgical, orthopaedic and plastic surgery units. Among the surgeons who worked there was Ian Scott Smillie who became an authority on knee surgery. The hospital closed in 1992 and the buildings were demolished in 2006. The site has since been developed as Oudenarde Village. Its archives are held by Archive Services, University of Dundee.
