= Bangour railway station =

Disused railway station in Bangour, Dechmont, West Lothian

Coordinates: 55.91963°N 3.54887°W

Bangour

General information
- Location: West Lothian; Scotland
- Platforms: 2

Other information
- Status: Disused

History
- Original company: Edinburgh and Bathgate Railway
- Pre-grouping: North British Railway

Key dates
- 19 June 1905: Opened
- 4 May 1921: Closed
Location

Bangour railway station was a railway station in West Lothian, Scotland. It was located on a short branch of the Edinburgh and Bathgate Railway.

== History ==
Opened to serve a hospital in 1905, the station did not survive to the 1923 Grouping, being closed by the North British Railway in 1921.

The Bangour Railway as it was known began with an east facing junction at Bangour Junction on the Edinburgh and Bathgate Railway. The junction hosted several sidings, and was located where the A899 Livingston Spine road crosses the railway today. A station, with a single platform and two sidings existed at Dechmont. The line terminated near the present day boiler house in Bangour Village Hospital. The line carried all the supplies for the hospital, but quickly became redundant when road access improved throughout the area. The line was funded by the Edinburgh and District Lunacy Board, and was classed as a private line.

== Services ==
Preceding station	Historical railways	Following station
Terminus	North British Railway; Edinburgh and Bathgate Railway	Dechmont; Line and station closed
