= Edward Meldrum =

Scottish chemist (1821–1875)

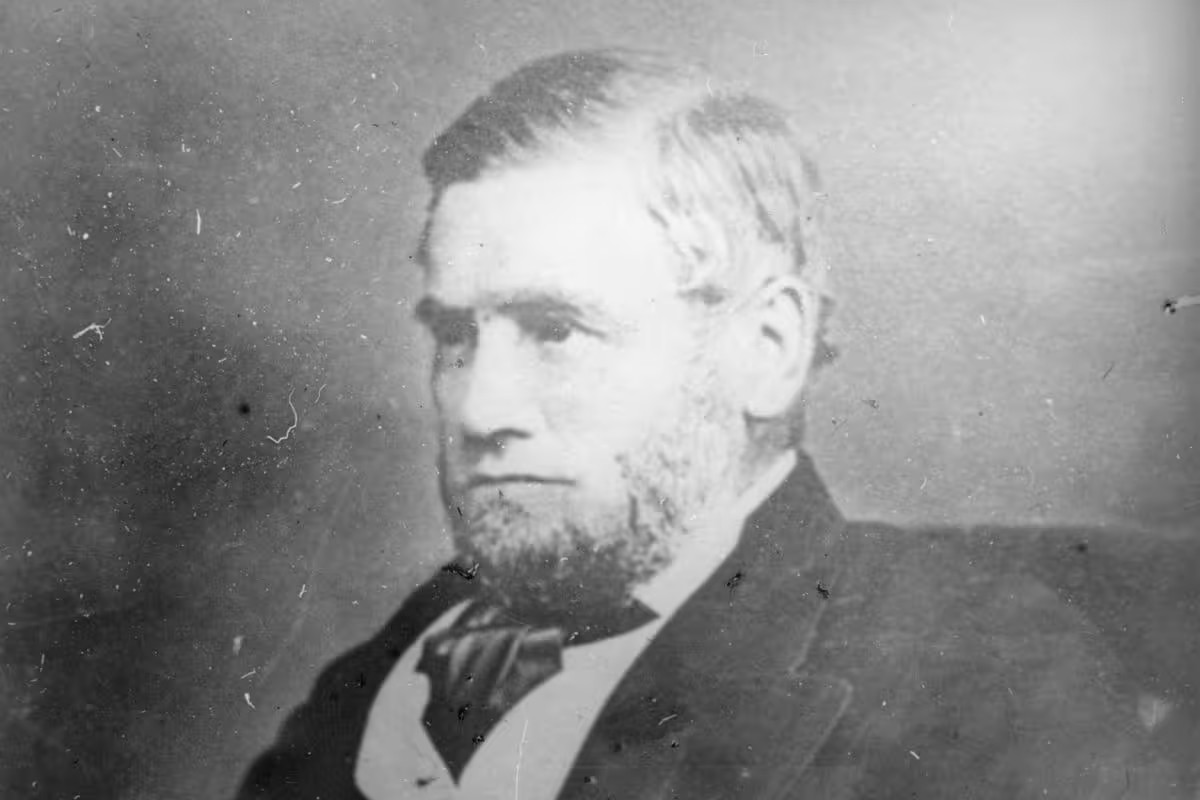
Edward Meldrum

Edward Meldrum FRSE DL (1821 – 13 June 1875) was a Scottish chemist who was partner to James Young in his oil and paraffin ventures creating the company Young & Meldrum and the independent company of Meldrum & Co in Glasgow.

== Life ==
He was born in 1821, in Kirkcaldy. He was educated at Kirkcaldy and then St Andrews.

He gained early experience at Muspratt's Chemical Works in Liverpool. Here in 1842 he encountered and befriended the company's manager, James Young. In 1848, he went into partnership with Young in the petrol works at Alfreton discovered by Lyon Playfair. When Young made his famous paraffin discoveries near Bathgate it was Meldrum with whom he formed a business partnership to extract the paraffin.

In 1855, he was running the oil firm of Meldrum & Co from 33, 35 Great Dovehill in Glasgow.

In 1863, he was elected a Fellow of the Royal Society of Edinburgh. His proposers was Lyon Playfair.

In 1866, he formed with P McLagan MP to create the Uphall Mineral Company. At this time he acquired and rebuilt Dechmont House nearby, renaming it Dechmont Castle.

He was Deputy Lieutenant of Linlithgowshire.

He died at home in Dechmont, on 13 June 1875. And was buried in Bathgate Cemetery.

== Family ==
He was married with four children.

== Artistic recognition ==
His marble bust sculpted by William Brodie was presented to Bathgate Town Hall in 1876 by James Young.
