= Radio Grapevine =

Scotland
- Broadcast area: NHS Lothian
- Frequencies: Closed-Wire System, Internet Streaming

Programming
- Format: Hospital

Ownership
- Owner: West Lothian Hospital Broadcasting Service

History
- First air date: 1992

Radio Grapevine is the hospital radio station serving St John's Hospital in Livingston, Scotland.

It is run by a voluntary team of around 40 members who collect requests, produce and present shows, raise funds and present "outdoor broadcasts" for the local community. As a charitable organisation, no member is paid for their services.

== History ==
The station is registered under the name of West Lothian Hospital Broadcasting Service (Scottish Charity No: SC022224). The station was founded in 1988 when plans for a new hospital in Livingston New Town were unveiled. Present at that initial meeting were volunteers of the newly created charity. It took four years to get the station on air and in 1992 the new Hospital Radio service for West Lothian began broadcasting across the newly built St John's Hospital at Howden in Livingston.

Over the following years, Radio Grapevine's membership continued to grow, and broadcasting stepped up to cover 7 days a week.

In 1999 and 2000 Radio Grapevine's studios, volunteers and music were used in two "Restricted Service Licence" (RSL) Test Broadcasts for a new dedicated West Lothian radio station which broadcast under the name "Real Radio". These broadcasts ultimately went on to form the basis of River FM in Livingston. It was from these two broadcasts that Radio Grapevine acquired its first Computer Playout system.

Since then, the playout systems have been upgraded and changed and the station now uses the Myriad programmes from P Squared. This allows the station to run 24 hours a day, and with a weekly and daily planned schedule of live and pre-recorded shows.

== Outdoor broadcasts / roadshows ==
Radio Grapevine regularly performs outdoor broadcasts and roadshows in the local West Lothian community including at local gala days and special celebratory events. The roadshows allow many events to have a clear public address system as well as a musical soundtrack for the day.

== Funding ==
Radio Grapevine is funded through its own fundraising activities and show sponsorship where local businesses and organisations can choose to support a particular show throughout the year.

== The station today ==
Radio Grapevine broadcasts live programmes most evenings between 5pm and 10pm. Each night from 7.00 - 8.30 has a different "specialist" programme including Classical Music, Show Music and Scottish music. Every night from 8.30 until 10.00pm there is a dedicated request show where patients in the hospital can hear their favourite song played by calling in a request or by speaking to a request collector. Radio Grapevine also produces dedicated children's programmes for the children's ward.

The station has a record library of nearly 35,000 songs which allows it to cater for a wide variety of musical tastes.

Radio Grapevine is a member-station of the Hospital Broadcasting Association and takes part in "Hospital Broadcasting Week" each year. This involves raising the profile of Hospital Radio locally and nationally.

Patients within the hospital can listen to Radio Grapevine through their bedside radio sets and switching to Channel 1 on the dial. Friends and relatives can make a dedication by visiting the website. The station is also streamed live over the internet to allow patients and carers in the community to continue to listen to the specialist programmes offered by hospital radio.

== Awards and recognition ==
Radio Grapevine has been nominated-for and received a number of awards at the UK National Hospital Radio Awards.

Recent awards include:

2018: Specialist Show (Fresh Sounds) - Silver Award | Best Male Presenter - Ross Coutts - Bronze Award | Innovation in Hospital Radio - Gold Award 2012: Station Promotion - Silver Award 2011: Best Newcomer - Callum Gallacher - Bronze 2011: Station Promotion - Silver Award. Best Female Presenter - Shelley Nobile - Bronze 2010: Best Female Presenter - Shelley Nobile - Gold. 2010: Station Promotion - Silver
