= Emergency Hospital Service =

Centralised care service in the UK during World War II

During World War II, the centralised state-run Emergency Hospital Service was established in the United Kingdom. It employed doctors and nurses to care for those injured by enemy action and arrange for their treatment across the range of local and charity hospitals that existed at that time. It was also known as the Emergency Medical Service, although this was, strictly speaking, the medical staff of the service.

== Planning ==
According to David Stark Murray "Until war became imminent it was only with the greatest difficulty that anyone could be persuaded to regard the chaotic and anachronistic structure of medical practice and hospital services as of any real importance to the nation." In 1938 London County Council seconded staff to the Ministry of Health to assist planning of medical and ambulance services. The London Voluntary Hospitals Committee negotiated with the Ministry. One of the first tasks was to survey the assortment of mental asylums, public assistance institutions and other hospitals which had been put at the disposal of the service. A Cabinet paper in March 1939 showed that there were only about 80,000 beds in England and Wales which could be used for the prolonged treatment of casualties. After the surveys in 1937 and 1938 the government had provided nearly 1,000 new operating theatres, 48,000,000 bandages and dressings and 250,000 bedsteads in "hutted annexes".

== Management ==
Initially John Harry Hebb was appointed Director General. The position was later occupied by Sir Francis Richard Fraser.

== Operation ==
The Ministry of Health formulated, and at the outbreak of war put into operation, the Emergency Hospitals Scheme. 2,378 hospitals were included in the scheme at the outbreak of war. They planned for hundreds of thousands civilian casualties needing medical help. One prediction made in 1937 warned German bombing might cause 600,000 civilian deaths and 1,200,000 in need of medical attention. (By 1945 the actual numbers were 61,000 civilians killed and 86,000 seriously wounded.) The plan was for 300,000 beds and 67,000 nurses needed to care for the expected air-raid casualties. 35,000 beds were requisitioned from mental health and mental deficiency hospitals, some of which were provided with X-ray apparatus, laboratories and operating theatres. There were also newly built hutted hospitals which, by the end of 1941, were expected to provide forty-five thousand beds. Many hospitals were removed from cities into the country, so the scheme included provision of an ambulance service for moving patients from one place to another. Hospital blocks of 300 or more beds were allotted for military purposes.

A network of Emergency Medical Service Control Centres was established, but the service did not include general practitioners or all specialists. Air Raid Precautions casualty services remained under separate control. The Emergency Hospital Service co-ordinated all the hospitals under the Ministry of Health; the hospitals themselves were still administered as in peacetime but the Ministry dictated the type of work they did, and the cost of performing it was paid in full to the voluntary hospitals and at 60% to the municipal hospitals. There was a system of area management, co-ordinated by group officers who controlled personnel and equipment which were pooled and allocated to different hospitals as required. London, where there were 68,000 EHS beds, was divided into nine triangular sectors, each with a large teaching hospital at its apex stretching out to base hospitals up to fifty miles away. Doctors, initially employed full-time were later paid a retainer fee of £500 a year to carry out part-time duties during the whole of the war and additional duties as needed. Similar arrangements were made for dentists, pharmacists and opticians.

By 1942 the hospital service had expanded to include:

- Service casualties and sick,
- Civil Defence workers,
- Home Guard, and Police War Reserve injured on duty,
- Unaccompanied evacuated children,
- Aged and infirm people evacuated from shelters,
- Essential war-workers living away from home,
- Fracture cases among Civil Defence workers, and others essential to industry,
- Seamen of the Merchant Navy,
- Evacuated or homeless persons billeted at the Government's expense,
- A few other special cases.

A 62-page booklet was issued showing who was eligible.

A number of special treatment centres, were established in particular dealing with plastic surgery and war neurosis, together with staff and laboratory facilities for a national blood transfusion service. Laboratories were established both for routine pathology and public health laboratories to diagnose epidemic disease, and to distribute serological products. The neurosis centres were set up first because of fears that public morale might crack under the strain of air bombardment.

It was estimated in 1943 that 3,000 beds had been lost in the general hospitals within the London County Council area due to bombing, and more were lost in the flying bomb and rocket attacks of 1944.

== See also ==
- Emergency Hospital Service (Scotland)
- Voluntary Aid Detachment
- History of public health in the United Kingdom
