= Emergency Hospital Service (Scotland) =

1940s hospital construction programme

The Emergency Hospital Service (EHS) of Scotland was an intensive, publicly funded programme of hospital building conducted by the Department of Health for Scotland during the 1940s. The scale and pace of public investment in hospital construction and staffing was unprecedented in Europe.

In a few years the EHS expanded Scottish hospital capacity by 60%, creating 20,500 additional beds. After the war, 13,000 of these EHS hospital beds and the accompanying staff, together with the older Highlands and Islands Medical Service facilities and staff, formed the basis of the Scottish National Health Service, founded in 1948.

== History ==
The EHS began in 1939 to cope with the expected high number of civilian casualties from German air raids. Scotland was prioritised as it was seen as the likely refuge for resistance if the Axis powers had invaded England.

Scottish civil servants had built up experience of directly running public health services since the establishment of the Highlands and Islands Medical Service in 1913, and they focussed their efforts into this new public works programme.

The expected numbers of civilian casualties never arrived at the new facilities, so Tom Johnston, the Secretary of State for Scotland (1941–45), decided to use the largely empty buildings to reduce long surgery waiting times, with 33,000 civilian patients treated by EHS facilities by the end of the war in 1945.

Johnston also used the new EHS facilities for a new range of publicly funded specialist health care: orthopaedic care, plastic surgery, eye injuries, psychoneurosis, neurosurgery and other specialities. The EHS also formed the basis of the national pathology laboratory service, and, in 1940 the Scottish National Blood Transfusion Association to improve existing transfusion services.

== EHS hospitals ==
Sites were identified to build hospitals at:

- Ballochmyle, Ayrshire
- Bridge of Earn, Perthshire
- Killearn, Stirlingshire
- Law, Lanarkshire
- Peel, Selkirkshire
- Raigmore, Inverness
- Stracathro, near Brechin, Angus

The EHS construction programme came to the attention of German military intelligence, but they mistook it for a military programme, so the Law and Stracathro hospitals were marked on Luftwaffe maps as barracks.

In addition to the 7 new hospitals and one clinic, the EHS constructed new annexes at existing hospitals. The annexe at Bangour Village Hospital, West Lothian developed into Bangour General Hospital.

Hotels were commandeered to provide convalescent accommodation. For example, Gleneagles Hotel was adapted to care for injured mineworkers.

== See also ==
- Emergency Hospital Service
