= St John's Hospital, Livingston =

St John's Hospital
- NHS Lothian
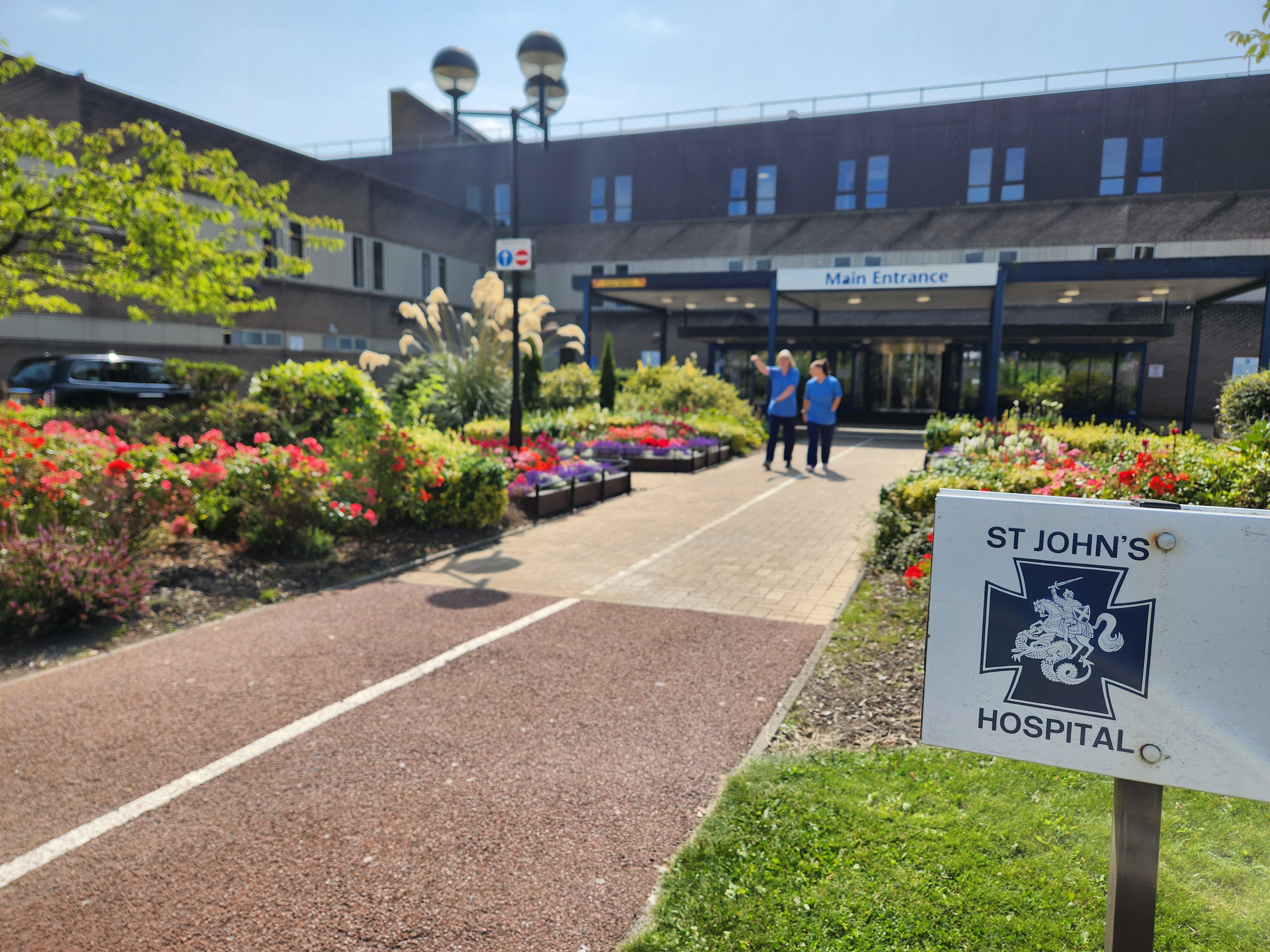
- St John's Hospital

- Shown in West Lothian

Geography
- Location: Livingston, West Lothian, Scotland, United Kingdom
- Coordinates: 55°53′31″N 3°31′23″W

Organisation
- Care system: NHS Scotland
- Type: General, acute, teaching
- Affiliated university: University of Edinburgh Medical School

Services
- Emergency department: Yes
- Beds: 550

History
- Founded: 1989

Links
- Website: Official website

St John's Hospital is the main general hospital in Livingston, West Lothian, Scotland. Located in the Howden area of the town, it serves Livingston and the wider West Lothian region. St John's is a teaching hospital for the University of Edinburgh Medical School. It is managed by NHS Lothian.

== History ==
The hospital was commissioned to replace Bangour General Hospital, near Dechmont to the north of Livingston. Livingston Development Corporation, which oversaw the development of the new town of Livingston from 1962, had planned to move the general hospital to Livingston from around 1974. The new hospital was officially opened by The Queen in 1989.

== Services ==
=== Hospital Services ===
The current facilities at St John's include a recently accident and emergency ward renovated in 2014, and a large maternity unit, with around 2,500 births annually. The radiology department uses a trust-wide PACS system, complete with 2 digital screening rooms, spiral CT, 4 ultrasound machines and a gamma camera. St John's contains many specialist services for south east Scotland, including oral and maxillofacial, burns and plastic surgery units. The hospital is being promoted as the main regional centre for elective surgery, and as a centre for minimally invasive surgery. This centre, supported by University of Edinburgh professors, will provide Plastic surgery, Gynaecology, Ear, Nose and Throat (ENT) surgery, orthopaedic surgery, and urology. The ENT in patient facility formerly based in Edinburgh has been relocated and amalgamated with the ENT services already located at St John's and serving West Lothian, with the intention of merging it with the existing head and neck unit, to form another regional centre. The improvements would see 4,500 patients per year being treated at St Johns.

==== Paediatric services ====
There is a paediatric ward within the hospital, but this was temporarily closed to in-patients over July and August 2015. This was due to staffing issues. Despite re-opening on 17 August 2015, NHS Lothian decided to review the service. The review was scheduled for early-summer 2016, and would be carried out by the Royal College of Paediatrics and Child Health. The ward underwent a similar part closure in 2012.

=== Hospital Radio ===
Radio Grapevine is the hospital radio station, which has been broadcasting to the main buildings of the hospital since 1991. They are a recognised Scottish registered charity. Patients, staff, family and friends can listen to this award-winning station dedicated to patient entertainment online via the Radio Grapevine website. They were the first Scottish hospital radio service to broadcast online. Patients can enjoy a dedicated request programme seven nights a week through their bedside units, day rooms or online.

=== Howden Health Centre ===
Howden Health Centre, is located within the hospital grounds, but predates the hospital by several years. It is a community health centre, and provides a range of health services for the local population. It also accommodates a large NHS medical practice.

== Transport ==
The hospital is well linked by public transport in the area, with various buses calling there at some point in their route. It is 1.5 miles from Livingston North train station, which provides links to Bathgate, Edinburgh, Airdrie, and Glasgow via the recently reopened Airdrie-Bathgate line. It has a large car park which, along with all NHS-run hospitals in Scotland, had the parking charges abolished on 31 December 2008.
