= Dechmont =

Village in West Lothian, Scotland

Coordinates: 55.921°N 3.537°W

Dechmont: Scottish Gaelic: Deagh-Mhonadh
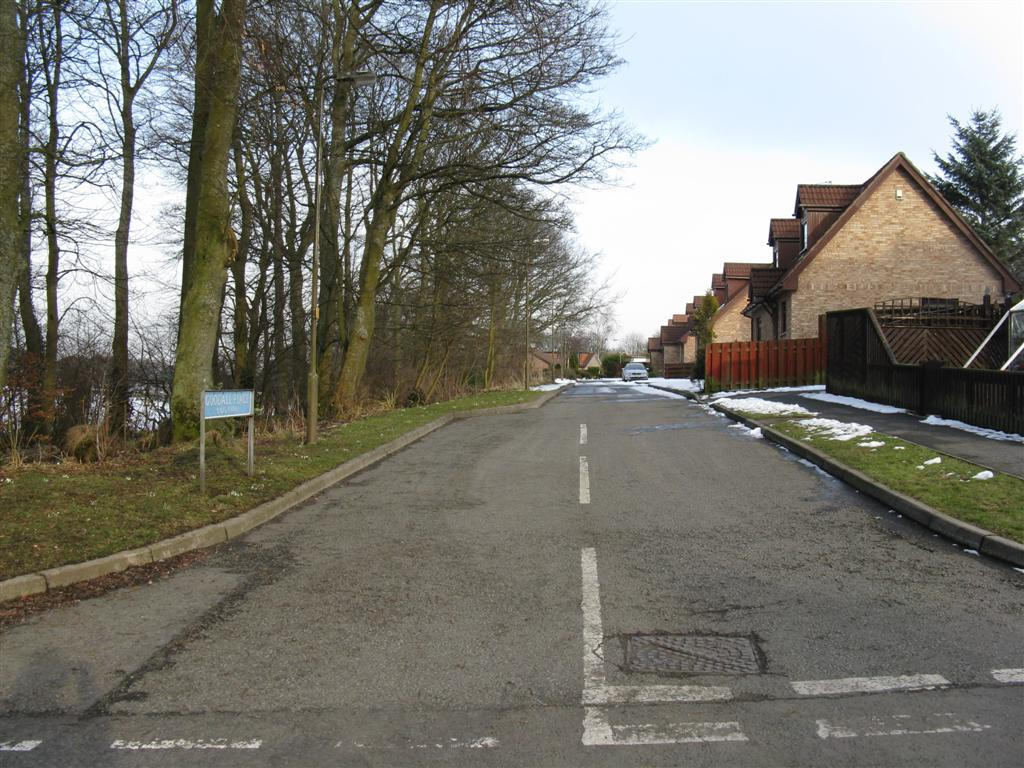
- Goodall Place, Dechmont

- Location within West Lothian
- Population: 620 (2020)
- OS grid reference: NT039708
- Council area: West Lothian
- Lieutenancy area: West Lothian
- Country: Scotland
- Sovereign state: United Kingdom
- Post town: BROXBURN
- Postcode district: EH52
- Dialling code: 01506
- Police: Scotland
- Fire: Scottish
- Ambulance: Scottish
- UK Parliament: Livingston
- Scottish Parliament: Linlithgow

Dechmont (/dɛxˈmənt/ DEKH-mənt; Gaelic: Deagh-Mhonadh) is a small village located near Uphall, West Lothian in Scotland. Bangour Village Hospital is located to the west of Dechmont. Its postal code is EH52. An alleged alien encounter took place in 1979 in the nearby Dechmont Woods.

== Etymology ==
The word "Dechmont" is Celtic in origin and likely from the Brythonic teg meaning "good" or "lovely", and mynydd meaning a moorland area. This has been Gaelicised as "Deagh-Mhonadh" which also means "good moorland" or summer grazing.

== Infrastructure ==
The village has a small infant/primary school providing learning for pre-school through to primary three pupils. In 2012 the school roll was thirteen which consisted of five primary one pupils; four primary two pupils and four primary three pupils as well as sixteen pre-school infants

Lothian Country operates daytime bus service X18 and night service N18 between Edinburgh and Whitburn via Broxburn, Bathgate and Armadale.

== Notable residents ==
Several notable persons born between the 1948 and 1990 are described as being 'from' Dechmont as per their birth certificate, but have only a tenuous link to the town due to being delivered at Bangour General Hospital which operated in that period; most children born here would have grown up elsewhere in West Lothian.

- Scott Arfield is a professional footballer who has played with Falkirk and Huddersfield Town and Burnley and now currently plays with Rangers. He is a former captain of the Canada national team.
- Stephen Gallacher - professional golfer, 4-time winner on the European tour and Ryder Cup Star was born in Dechmont in 1974.
- Edward Meldrum, the business partner of James Young bought Old Dechmont House in 1865 and rebuilt it as Dechmont Castle in 1869. He died there in 1875.
- Hannah Rarity - Scots traditional singer who was raised in Dechmont.

== See also ==
- Robert Taylor incident
