= Ian Fraser Muir =

British plastic surgeon

Ian Fraser Kerr Muir MBE FRCSE FRCS
- Born: 26 August 1921; West Hartlepool, England
- Died: 6 December 2008 (aged 87); Leicester, England
- Education: Epsom College
- Occupation: Plastic surgeon
- Known for: Muir and Barclay formula
- Medical career
- Institutions: Mount Vernon Centre for Plastic Surgery; Aberdeen Royal Infirmary
- Notable works: Burns and their treatment (1962)

Ian Fraser Muir (26 August 1921 – 6 December 2008) MBE FRCS FRCSEd was an English plastic surgeon at the West Middlesex Hospital and Mount Vernon Centre for Plastic Surgery. While working there he developed what became known as the 'Muir and Barclay formula' which estimates the volume of fluid replacement required in the initial resuscitation after major burns. In 1969, he relocated to Aberdeen to set up the plastic surgery and burns unit, having been appointed plastic surgeon and senior lecturer in Surgery at the University of Aberdeen. He was elected president of the British Association of Plastic Surgeons (later The British Association of Plastic, Reconstructive and Aesthetic Surgeons.)

== Early life ==
Muir was born in West Hartlepool, County Durham, England. His mother was Margaret McKenzie Muir (née Duke), a nurse and his father, John Kerr Muir had qualified as a radiologist and worked as a general practitioner in the town. Douglas McKenzie Kerr Muir, his brother emigrated to Canada and worked as a radiologist in British Columbia. Muir went to school at Rosebank High School, West Hartlepool, before going on to Epsom College. He studied medicine at Middlesex Hospital Medical School, where he had a distinguished undergraduate career. In 1943 he qualified MB BS winning the Lyell gold medal in surgery.

== Career ==
After a resident post at Middlesex Hospital he was appointed surgeon lieutenant in the Royal Navy Medical Service in May 1944, serving as medical officer on the repair ship HMS Artifex in the East Indies. He was awarded the MBE (Military Division) in 1946. After leaving active service in 1947 he remained on the Royal Naval Volunteer Reserve (RNVR) reserve list and was awarded the Royal Naval Volunteer Reserve Decoration (VRD) in 1966.

On return to civilian life he worked at St Andrew's Hospital, Dollis Hill, and then at the Middlesex Hospital where he began his surgical training, being awarded the Fellowship of the Royal College of Surgeons of England in 1948. In 1949 he was appointed surgical registrar at Queen Elizabeth Hospital in Birmingham following which he became senior registrar in plastic surgery at Hill End Hospital and Mount Vernon Hospital. He worked under the New Zealand-born plastic surgeon Arthur Rainsford Mowlem who had been trained by Sir Harold Gillies and later worked in partnership with Gillies and Sir Archibald McIndoe. Mowlem was to prove an influential trainer and mentor. Muir became consultant at West Middlesex Hospital and Mount Vernon Centre for Plastic Surgery in 1955. In 1960 he attained the degree of MS (Master of Surgery).

At Mount Vernon he teamed up with Thomas Laird Barclay and together they devised what became known as the 'Muir and Barclay formula' for fluid replacement in major burns. This formula can be used to calculate the volume of intravenous fluid which should be given to patients who have sustained extensive burns. The formula states that the volume in millilitres of fluid to be given in each period is equal to the total percentage of burn surface area multiplied by the body weight in kilograms. This volume is then recalculated every four hours for the first 12 hours and then every six hours between 12 and 24 hours and again after 36 hours. They argued that as much of the fluid loss contained protein that the fluid used for the resuscitation should be colloid solution and they recommended plasma. The surface area of the burn can be calculated by the Wallace Rule of Nines published by the Scottish plastic surgeon A B Wallace in 1951. A review in 2011 showed that the Muir and Barclay formula was still in use in the UK.

During this time he co-authored with Barclay Burns and their treatment (London, Lloyd-Luke Medical Books, 1962), and this became a widely used textbook on the subject.

Muir had always been aware of his Scottish ancestry and decided, in 1969, to relocate to Aberdeen, where he established the plastic surgery and burns unit, working at Aberdeen Royal Infirmary and Woodend Hospital. In addition he had an academic appointment as senior lecturer in Surgery at the University of Aberdeen. After retiring in 1986 he continued to work in the unit as a research assistant and continued to supervise postgraduate degrees.

== Honours ==
He was appointed Hunterian Professor at the Royal College of Surgeons of England in 1983 and gave the McIndoe lecture in 1993. In 1982 he became president of the British Association of Plastic Surgeons and was president of the Aberdeen Medico-Chirurgical Society.

== Family ==
Muir married Marion Pinks, a nurse, in 1947. They had two children: Jennifer who was born in 1950 and Colin who was born in 1952. Marion died in 1965.

== Later life and death ==
His latter years were spent in Leicester where he died in 2008.

== Selected bibliography ==
Burns and their treatment (1962) London, Lloyd-Luke Medical Books. (jointly with T L Barclay)
