= Lynne Rienner Publishers =

American independent publishing firm

- Founded: 1984; 41 years ago
- Headquarters location: Boulder, Colorado, U.S.
- Distribution: self-distributed (North America); Eurospan Group (Europe); Taylor & Francis (Asia, Australia); Cranbury International (Latin America)
- Publication types: Books, Journals
- Official website: www.rienner.com

Lynne Rienner Publishers is an independent scholarly and textbook publishing firm based in Boulder, Colorado. It was founded in 1984 and remains one of the few independent publishers in the United States.

It publishes primarily in the fields of international studies and comparative world politics, but also covers U.S. politics, sociology, Black politics, criminology, and the translation of relevant works into English. Its translated publications include books by Tawfiq al-Hakim, Ghassan Kanafani, Naguib Mahfouz, Derek Walcott, among others.

The company's publishing program includes the FirstForumPress, a specialized scholarly research forum that focuses on important work that might be overlooked due to market constraints, and the Kumarian Press, which focuses on poverty, underdevelopment, war, human rights abuses, and nonprofit management.
