= Walter Mercer =

Scottish surgeon (1890–1971)

Sir Walter Mercer KBE FRSE FRCSEd FRCPE LLD (19 March 1890 – 23 February 1971) was a Scottish orthopaedic surgeon. He was President of the Royal College of Surgeons of Edinburgh from 1951 to 1956. He was affectionately known as 'Wattie.' His collection of anatomical specimens was donated to Surgeon's Hall in Edinburgh, and is now known as the Walter Mercer Collection.

== Life ==
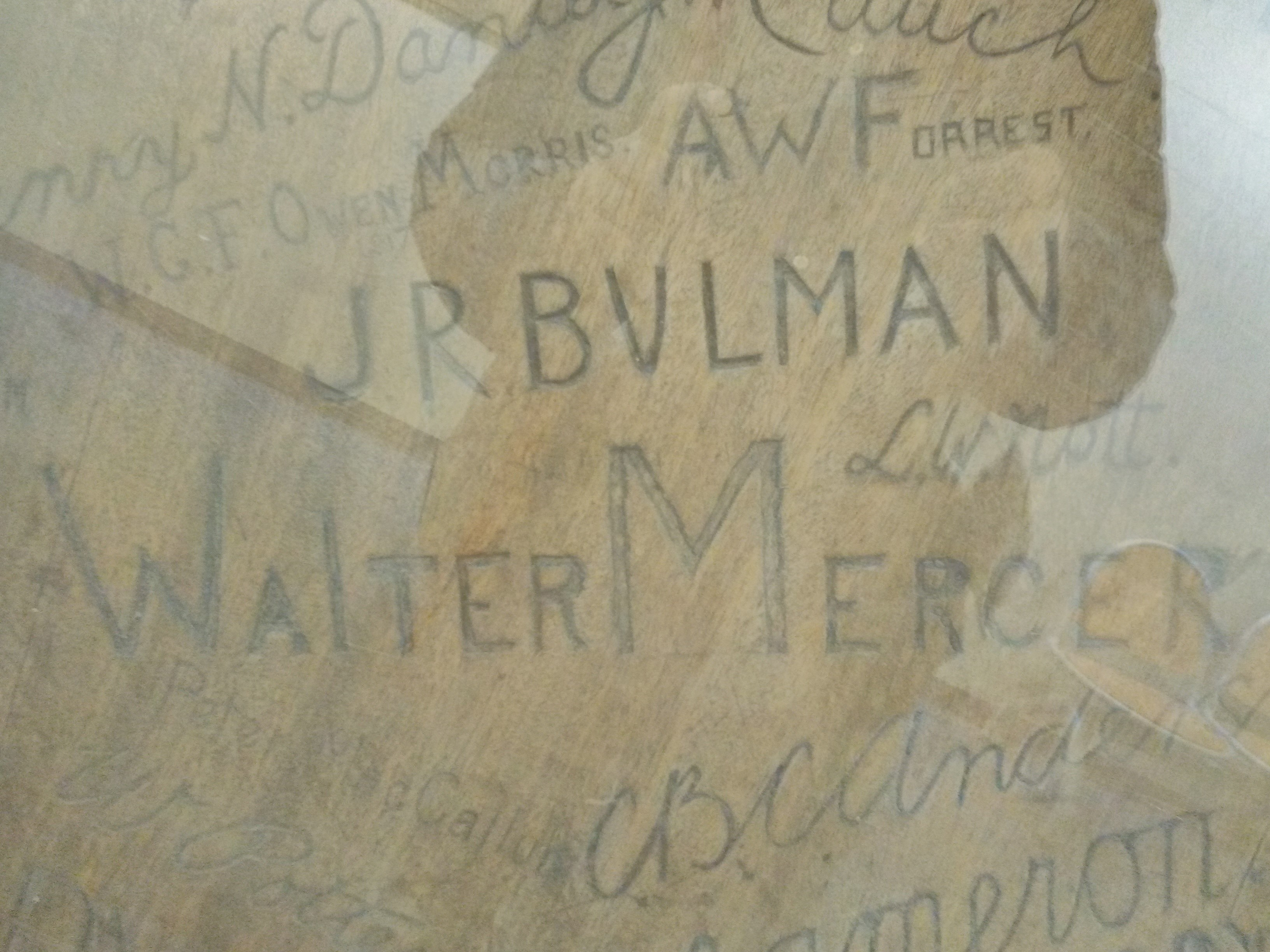
Walter Mercer's name carved on the preserved doctors table at the Edinburgh Royal Infirmary

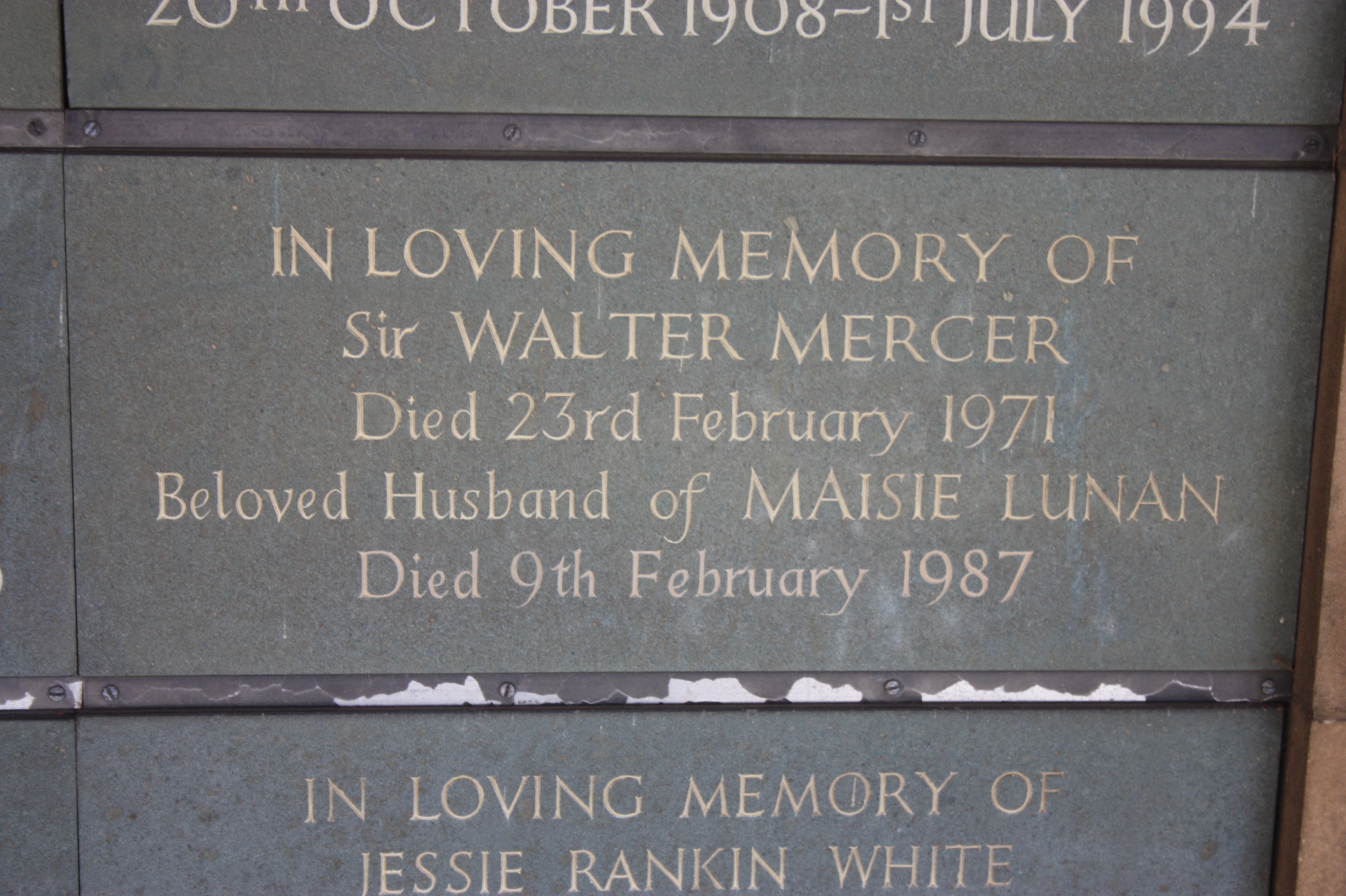
Memorial plaque to Sir Walter Mercer, Warriston Crematorium

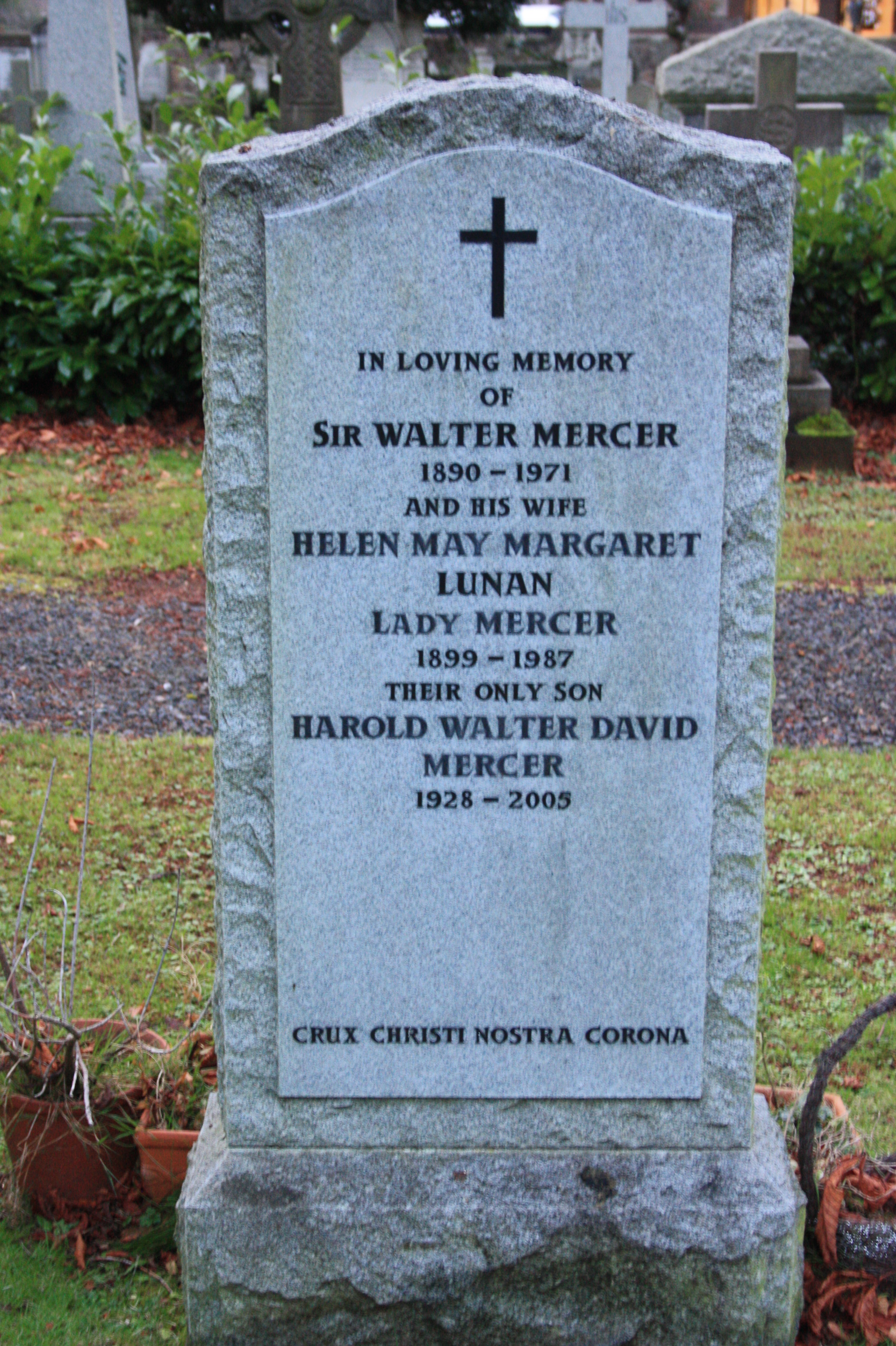
The grave of Sir Walter Mercer, Dean Cemetery, Edinburgh

Mercer was born on 19 March 1890 in Stow, Scotland, the second son of Jessie Mary Graham (née Greenfield) and Ebenezer Beattie Mercer, a woollen manufacturer and tweed mill owner. He was educated at George Watson's College, going on to study medicine at the University of Edinburgh from 1907 to 1912, graduating with an MB ChB. He then received a house post in Carlisle Infirmary.

In the World War I he joined the Royal Army Medical Corps attached to the Kings Own Scottish Borderers and the Royal Scots Fusiliers. He served in France, Italy and the Mediterranean. He was invalided back to Britain and then served in the Bangour Military Hospital where he began to take an interest in orthopaedics.

When he was demobilised in 1920 he went to work at Tynecastle Orthopaedic Clinic in Edinburgh. In 1925 he joined the staff of Edinburgh Royal Infirmary. He concurrently took on the role of thoracic surgeon at the South Eastern Counties of Scotland Sanatorium at East Fortune.

In 1929 he was elected a Fellow of the Royal Society of Edinburgh. His proposers were Sir John Fraser, John Brown Clark, Arthur Logan Turner and George Fowlie Merson.

In the World War II he was consultant orthopaedic surgeon to the Department of Health.

He became the first Professor of Orthopaedic Surgery at the University of Edinburgh in 1948, and was knighted by Queen Elizabeth II in 1956. He was elected a member of the Aesculapian Club in 1953. He retired in 1958. In 1959 he was elected President of the Harveian Society of Edinburgh.

He died on 23 February 1971.

== Memorials ==
Mercer's name is one of the many carved names taken from the old Edinburgh Royal Infirmary on Lauriston Place and now displayed at the new facility at Little France.

The Sir Walter Mercer medal is awarded annually to the highest scoring candidate in the Royal College Intercollegiate Specialty Examination in Trauma & Orthopaedic Surgery at the first attempt.

== Publications ==
- Orthopaedic Surgery (1932 reprinted 1964)

== Artistic recognition ==
His portrait by Sir William Oliphant Hutchison is held by the Scottish National Portrait Gallery.
