= James Young (chemist) =

Scottish chemist (1811–1883)

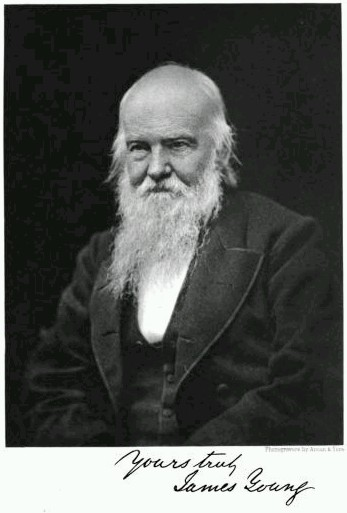
- Born: 13 July 1811; Glasgow, Scotland
- Died: 13 May 1883 (aged 71); Wemyss Bay, Scotland

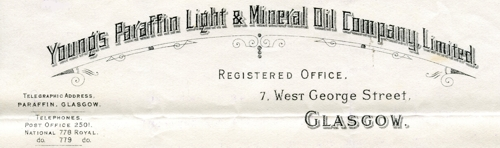
Young's Paraffin Light and Mineral Oil Company Letterhead, 1909

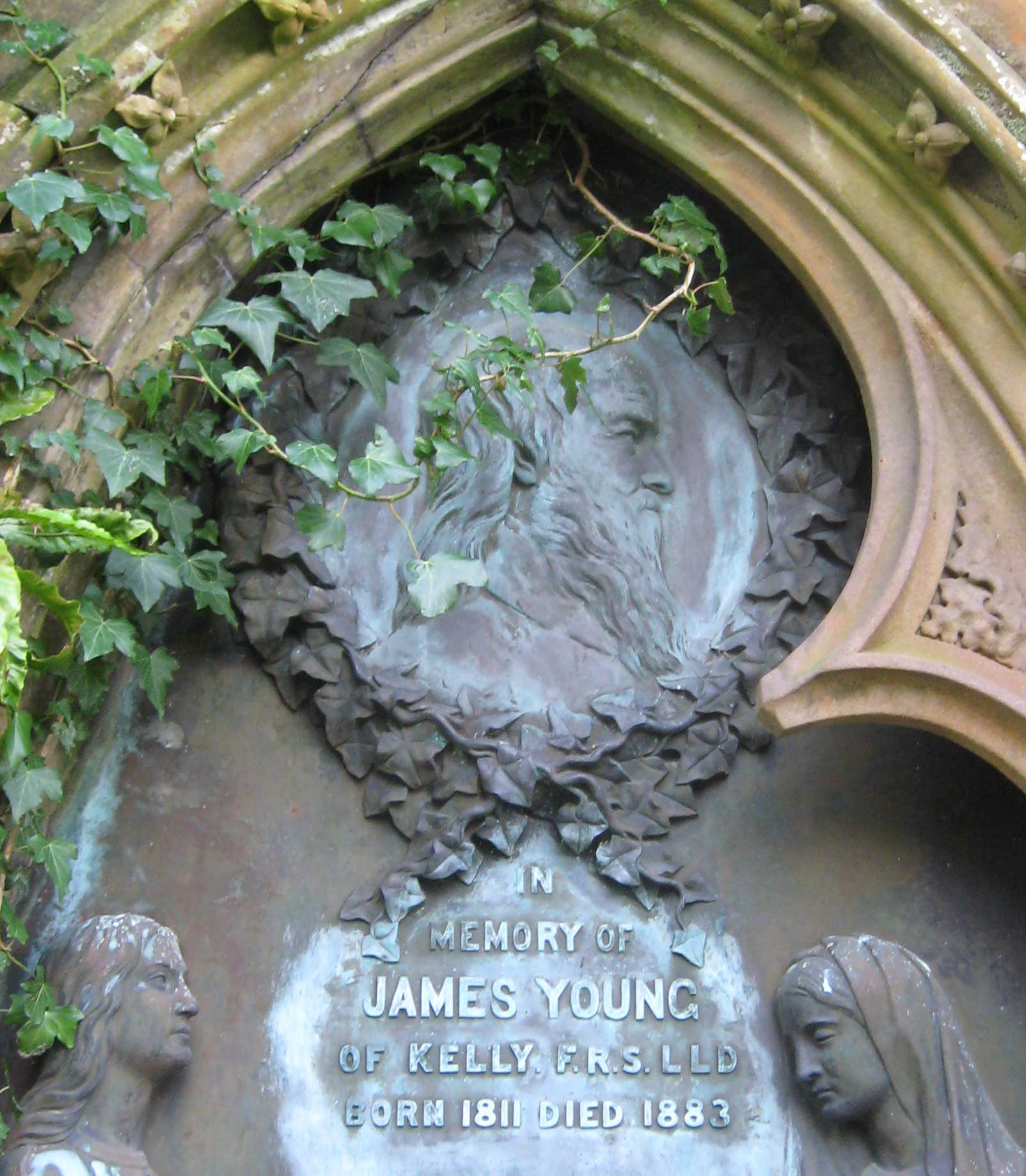
Portrait bust of James Young, on his gravestone in Inverkip cemetery

James Young (13 July 1811 – 13 May 1883) was a Scottish chemist best known for his method of distilling paraffin from coal and oil shales. He is often referred to as Paraffin Young.

== Life ==
James Young was born in Shuttle Street in the Drygate area of Glasgow, the son of John Young, a cabinetmaker and joiner, and his wife Jean Wilson.

He became his father's apprentice at an early age, but educated himself at night school, attending evening classes in chemistry at the nearby Anderson's College (now Strathclyde University) from the age of 19. At Anderson's College he met Thomas Graham, who had just been appointed as a lecturer on chemistry. In 1831 Young was appointed as Graham's assistant and occasionally took some of his lectures. While at Anderson's College he also met and befriended the explorer David Livingstone; this friendship continued until Livingstone's death in Africa many years later.

On 21 August 1838 he married Mary Young of Paisley middle parish; in 1839 they moved to Lancashire.

He died at Kelly House at Wemyss Bay in western Scotland on 13 May 1883. He and his wife Mary are buried in the Old Inverkip Churchyard in the Shaw-Stewart Mausoleum (see photo)

== Career ==
In Young's first scientific paper, dated 4 January 1837, he described a modification of a voltaic battery invented by Michael Faraday. Later that same year he moved with Graham to University College, London where he helped him with experimental work.

=== Chemicals ===
In 1839 Young was appointed manager at James Muspratt's chemical works Newton-le-Willows, near St Helens, Merseyside, and in 1844 to Tennants, Clow & Co. at Manchester, for whom he devised a method of making sodium stannate directly from cassiterite.

=== Potato blight ===
In 1845 he served on a committee of the Manchester Literary and Philosophical Society for the investigation of potato blight, and suggested immersing the potatoes in dilute sulphuric acid as a means of combatting the disease; he was not elected a member of the Society until 19 October 1847. Finding the Manchester Guardian newspaper insufficiently liberal, he also began a movement for the establishment of the Manchester Examiner newspaper which was first published in 1846.

== Oils ==
In 1847 Young had his attention called to a natural petroleum seepage in the Riddings colliery at Alfreton, Derbyshire from which he distilled a light thin oil suitable for use as lamp oil, at the same time obtaining a thicker oil suitable for lubricating machinery.

In 1848 Young left Tennants', and in partnership with his friend and assistant Edward Meldrum, set up a small business refining the crude oil. The new oils were successful, but the supply of oil from the coal mine soon began to fail (eventually being exhausted in 1851). Young, noticing that the oil was dripping from the sandstone roof of the coal mine, theorised that it somehow originated from the action of heat on the coal seam and from this thought that it might be produced artificially.

Following up this idea, he tried many experiments and eventually succeeded in producing, by distilling cannel coal at a low heat, a fluid resembling petroleum, which when treated in the same way as the seep oil gave similar products. Young found that by slow distillation he could obtain a number of useful liquids from it, one of which he named "paraffine oil" because at low temperatures it congealed into a substance resembling paraffin wax.

== Patents ==
The production of these oils and solid paraffin wax from coal formed the subject of his patent dated 17 October 1850. In 1850 Young & Meldrum and Edward William Binney entered into partnership under the title of E.W. Binney & Co. at Bathgate in West Lothian and E. Meldrum & Co. at Glasgow; their works at Bathgate were completed in 1851 and became the first truly commercial oil-works in the world, using oil extracted from locally mined torbanite, lamosite, and bituminous coal to manufacture naphtha and lubricating oils; paraffin for fuel use and solid paraffin were not sold till 1856.

In 1852 Young left Manchester to live in Scotland and that same year took out a US patent for the production of paraffin oil by distillation of coal. Both the US and UK patents were subsequently upheld in both countries in a series of lawsuits and other producers were obliged to pay him royalties. Torbanite was exceptionally rich, yielding 537 litres of petroleum spirit per tonne but it was a finite resource, which was completely exhausted by 1862. Geological surveys at the time showed the potential for similar sedimentary deposits in West Lothian, leading to the discovery of oil shales at Broxburn in 1858. The oil shales were less rich, typically yielding 150-180 litres per tonne, but the discovery meant that Young could extend his operations to West Lothian.

== Young's Paraffin Light and Mineral Oil Company ==
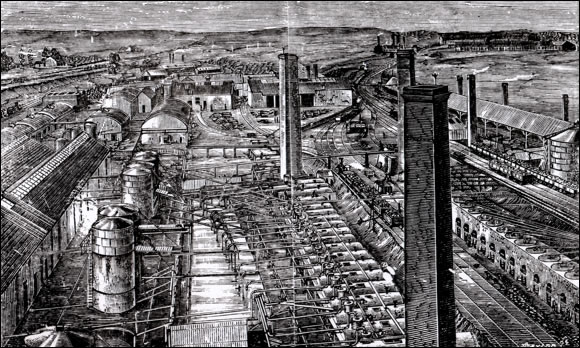
Addiewell Works in West Lothian

In 1865 Young bought out his business partners and built second and larger works at Addiewell, near West Calder. It was a substantial industrial complex, in its time one of the largest chemical works in Scotland. In 1866 Young sold the concern to Young's Paraffin Light and Mineral Oil Company. Although Young remained in the company, he took no active part in it, instead withdrawing from business to occupy himself with yachting, travelling, scientific pursuits, and looking after the estates which he had purchased.

The company continued to grow and expanded its operations, selling paraffin oil and paraffin lamps all over the world and earning for its founder the nickname "Paraffin" Young. Addiewell remained the centre of operations for Young's Paraffin Light and Mineral Oil Co. Ltd.. By the 1900s nearly 2 million tons of shale were being extracted annually, employing 4,000 men. The West Lothian oil-shale industry peaked in around 1892 operating 120 oil shale works, but the end was approaching. Retorting the oil shale was energy intensive and expensive. Cheaper free-flowing petroleum from Russia and later the USA, effectively priced oil shales out of the market, causing the industry to almost collapse by 1919, long after Young himself had died. Young's refinery closed around 1921. (Note: despite the economic challenges, the UK Admiralty and later UK Governments kept the industry alive until 1962, to provide some degree of fuel independence, particularly during war time. Mining changed the physical landscape of West Lothian, which is punctuated by large bings, with preservations orders on them signifying their importance to the history of the region.)

== Other work ==
- During the height of enthusiasm for the Volunteer movement, Young formed the 4th Linlithgowshire Rifle Volunteer Corps at Bathgate on 9 August 1862, mainly from employees of his chemical works, with Young himself as Captain in command until 1865. It later became D Company of the 8th Volunteer Battalion, Royal Scots.
- Young made significant discoveries in rustproofing ships in 1872, which were later adopted by the Royal Navy. Noticing that bilge water was acidic, he suggested that quicklime could be used to prevent it corroding iron ships.
- Young worked with Professor George Forbes on the speed of light around 1880, using an improved version of Hippolyte Fizeau's method.

== Honours ==
- In 1847 Young was elected to the Manchester Literary and Philosophical Society.
- In 1861 he was elected Fellow of the Royal Society of Edinburgh. (proposed by Lyon Playfair)
- From 1868–1877 he was President of Anderson's College and founded the Young Chair of Technical Chemistry at the College.
- In 1873 Young was elected a Fellow of the Royal Society
- In 1879 he was awarded an honorary doctorate (LLD) from St. Andrews University.
- From 1879–1881 he was Vice-President of the Chemical Society.

== Retirement and death ==
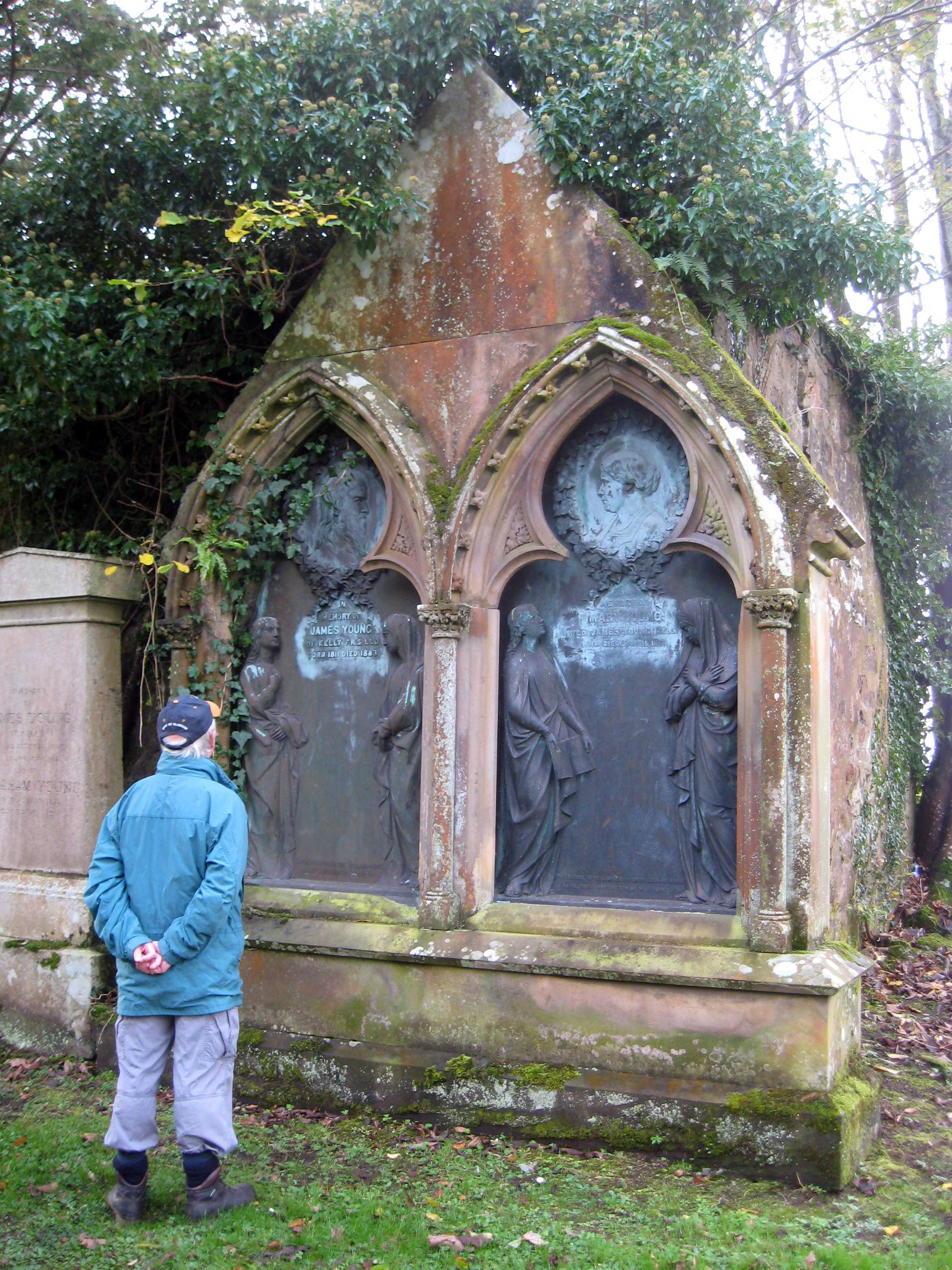
The memorial to James Young and his wife Mary is sited in the old Inverkip churchyard, at the north end of the mausoleum of the Shaw-Stewart Baronets.

Young's wife died on 6 April 1868, and by 1871 he had moved with his children to Kelly House, near Wemyss Bay in the district of Inverkip. The 1881 census record shows him living with his son and daughter at this estate. Young died at the age of 71 in his home on 13 May 1883, in the presence of his son James. He and his wife were buried at the Old Inverkip Churchyard in the Shaw-Stewart Mausoleum.

== Legacy ==
- Statues of his old professor, Thomas Graham, and of his fellow student and lifelong friend, David Livingstone, which stand respectively in George Square, Glasgow, and at Glasgow Cathedral, were erected by him.
- From 1855 James 'Paraffin' Young lived at Limefield House, Polbeth. A sycamore tree which Livingstone planted in 1864 is still flourishing in the grounds of Limefield House. There too one can see a miniature version of the "Victoria Falls", which the missionary discovered in the mid-19th century. It was built, as a tribute to Livingstone, by Young on the little stream which runs through the estate.
- Young had a lifelong friendship with David Livingstone, whom he had met at Anderson's College. He gave generously towards the expenses of Livingstone's African expeditions, and contributed to a search expedition, which proved too late to find Livingstone alive. He also had Livingstone's servants brought to Scotland, and presented to Glasgow a statue to his memory, which was erected in George Square, Glasgow.
- The James Young High School in Livingston, the streets James Young Road in Bathgate and James Young Avenue in Uphall Station, and the James Young Halls at the University of Strathclyde are all named after him.
- In 2011 he was one of seven inaugural inductees to the Scottish Engineering Hall of Fame.

== See also ==
- Pumpherston
- Luther Atwood
- Abraham Pineo Gesner
- Alexander Selligue
- History of the oil shale industry
- Monkland Railways
- Wilsontown, Morningside and Coltness Railway
