= Ian Muir (Scottish footballer) =

Scottish footballer

Personal information
- Full name: Ian Baker Muir
- Date of birth: 16 June 1929
- Place of birth: Motherwell, Scotland
- Date of death: 22 February 2009 (aged 79)
- Place of death: Bristol, England
- Height: 1.83 m (6 ft 0 in)
- Position: Centre half

Senior career*
Years	Team	Apps	(Gls)
	Thorniewood United	?	(?)
1950–1952	Motherwell	7	(0)
1953–1957	Bristol Rovers	26	(0)
1957–1958	Oldham Athletic	35	(0)
1958–1959	Rhyl	?	(?)
Total		68	(0)
- * Club domestic league appearances and goals

Ian Baker Muir (16 June 1929 – 22 February 2009) was a Scottish footballer who played as a centre half in the Football League.
