= Lester Salamon =

American academic (1943–2021)

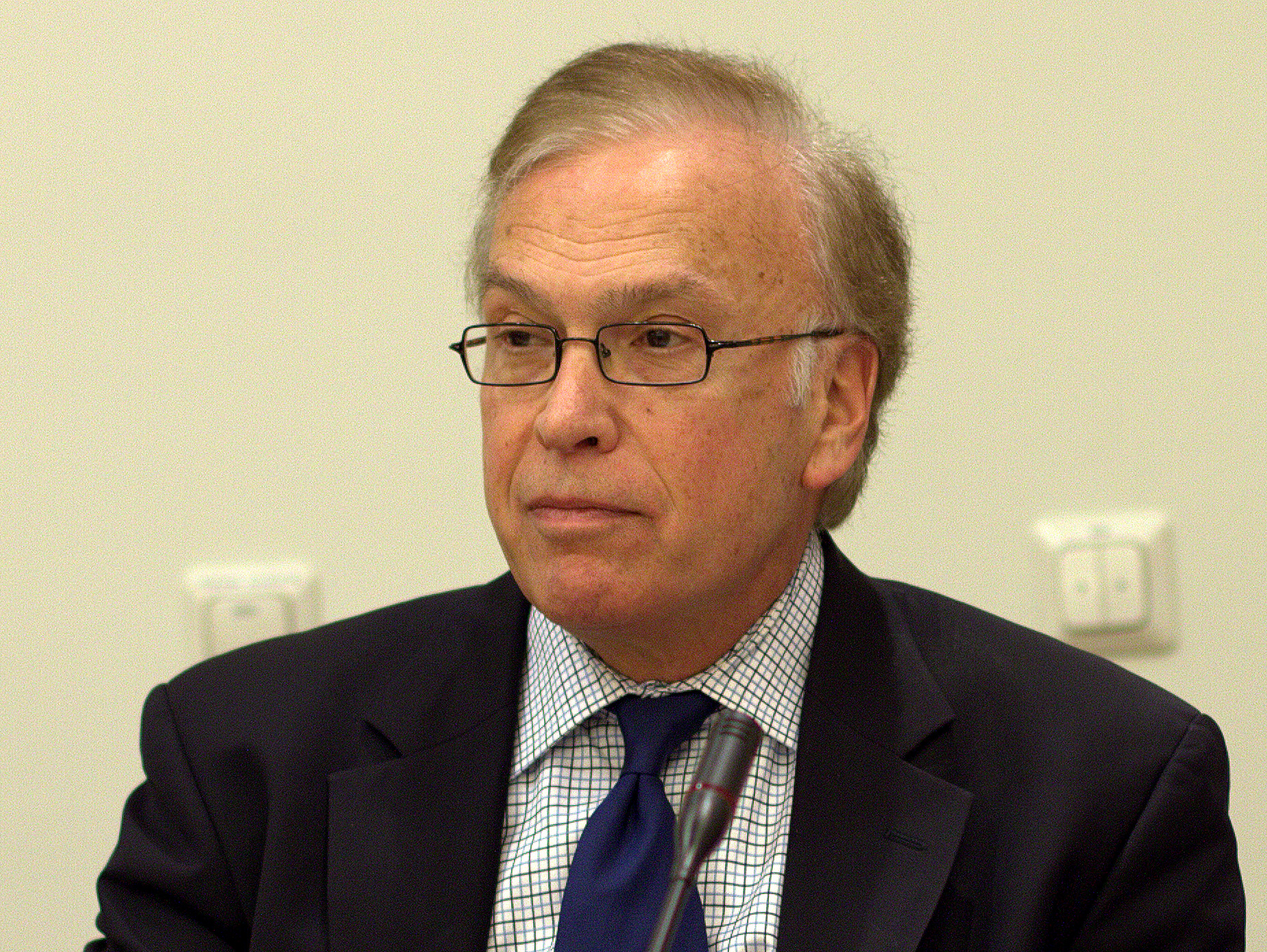
Salamon in 2011

Lester M. Salamon (11 January 1943 – 20 August 2021) was a professor at Johns Hopkins University. He was also the director of the Center for Civil Society Studies at The Johns Hopkins Institute for Health and Social Policy Studies. Salamon has written or edited over 20 books in addition to hundreds of articles, monographs and chapters that have appeared in Foreign Affairs, The New York Times, Voluntas, and numerous other publications. He was a pioneer in the empirical study of the nonprofit sector in the United States, and is considered by many experts in his field to have been a leading specialist on alternative tools of government action and on the nonprofit sector in the U.S. and around the world.

== Education ==
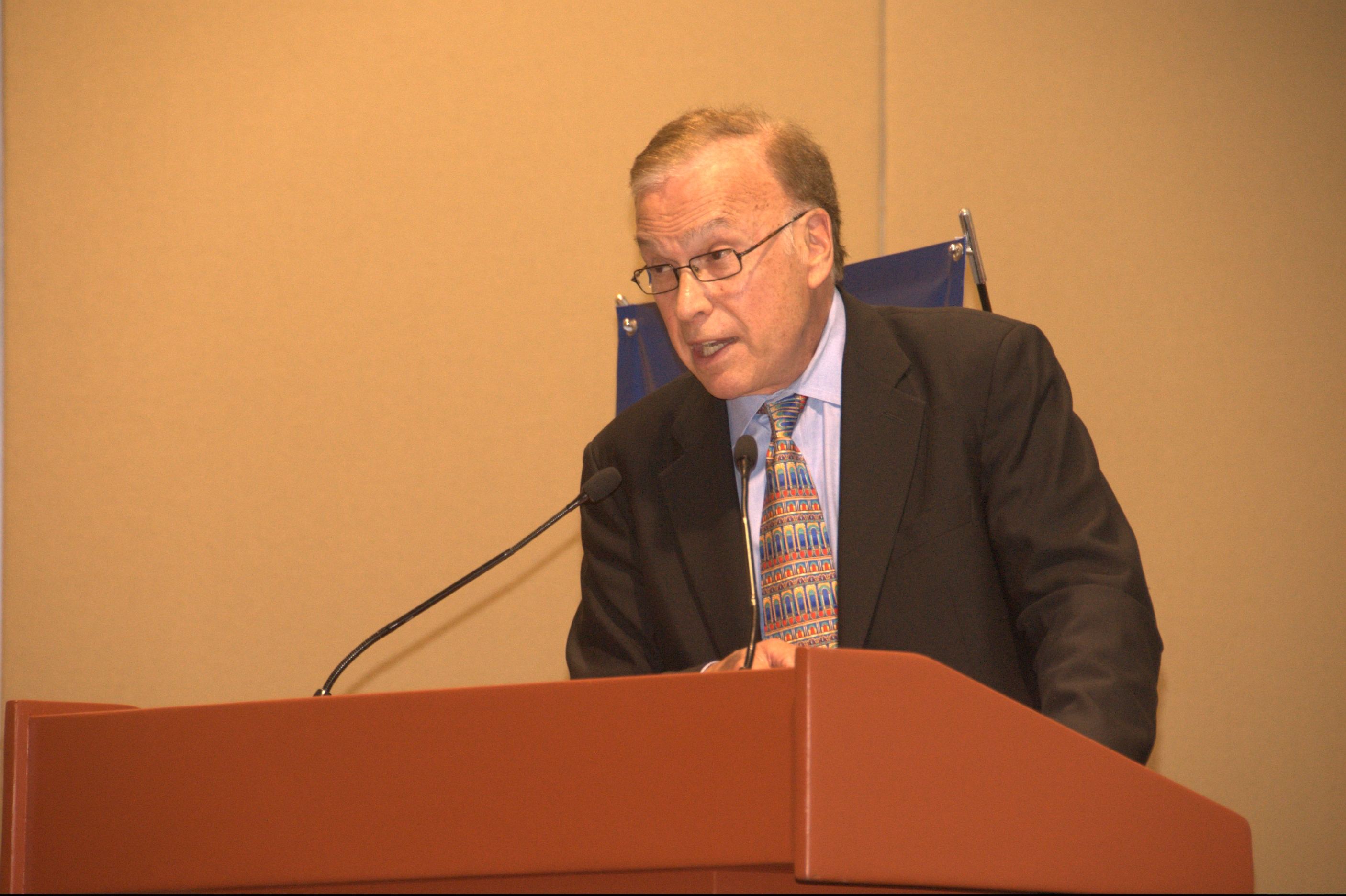
Salamon speaking at a conference at the Monterrey Institute of Technology and Higher Education, Mexico City.

Salamon graduated with a bachelor's degree in Economics and Policy Studies from Princeton University in 1964 and earned a Ph.D. in Government from Harvard University in 1971.

== Career ==
Salamon was the director for the Center for Civil Society Studies, Institute for Policy Studies at The Johns Hopkins University, and also a professor at Johns Hopkins School of Arts and Sciences (1997 to present). The Institute for Policy Studies was a research and training center involving 14 full-time professionals focusing on issues related to nonprofit organizations, philanthropy, and civil society in the United States and throughout the world.

From 1987 to 1997, Salamon was the director of the Institute for Policy Studies, which he founded, and a professor at the School of Arts and Sciences, The Johns Hopkins University. He also conceived and established the Johns Hopkins Comparative Nonprofit Sector Project, the Johns Hopkins Master of Arts in Policy Studies Program, and related research and training programs.

Salamon was the director of the Center for Governance and Management Research at the Urban Institute in Washington, D.C.from 1980 to 1986, where he conceived, secured funding for, and managed the Urban Institute's Nonprofit Sector Project, a major inquiry into the scope and structure of the private, nonprofit sector. He was the deputy associate director of the U.S. Office of Management and Budget in Washington, D.C., from 1977 to 1979.

Salamon taught at Duke University (1977–1980), Vanderbilt University (1970–1973), and at Tougaloo College in Tougaloo, Mississippi (1966–1967).

== Professional Activities ==
Salamon held the position of Chairman of the Board of the Community Foundation of the Chesapeake, and served on the Board of the Maryland Association of Nonprofit Organizations (MANO). He was a member of the Social Science Research Council's Committee on Philanthropy and the Nonprofit Sector. He was also on the Editorial Boards of Voluntas, Administration and Society, Society, Public Administration Review, and Nonprofit and Voluntary Sector Quarterly.

== Honors, Prizes and Fellowships ==
In 1996 Salamon won the 1996 ARNOVA (Association for Research on Nonprofit Organizations and Voluntary Action) Award for Distinguished Book in the Nonprofit and Voluntary Action Research Writing Partners in Public Service: Government and the Nonprofit Sector in the Modern Welfare State. Another book of his, The Global Civil Society: Dimensions of the Nonprofit Sector, which was produced in association with a team of colleagues from around the world, won the Virginia Hodgkinson Award for best publication in the nonprofit field in 2001. He won the Distinguished Lifetime Achievement Award from ARNOVA in November 2003.

In 1982, Salamon published his book, The Federal Budget and the Nonprofit Sector, which was among the first to state the scale of the American nonprofit sector and talk about the extent of government support for it. Dr. Salamon later completed an empirical assessment of international nonprofits, and went on to publish his observations in several books. He is well known for writing America's Nonprofit Sector: A Primer, a book used commonly as a college textbook.

In 2022, the journal Nonprofit Policy Forum published a special memorial issue to honor Dr. Salamon’s legacy and lasting impact on the field of nonprofit studies.

== Recent Publications ==
Books

Explaining Civil Society Development: A Social Origins Approach (Baltimore: Johns Hopkins University Press, 2017)

Rethinking Corporate Social Engagement: Lessons from Latin America (Sterling, VA: Kumarian Press, 2010).

Global Civil Society: Dimensions of the Nonprofit Sector (with S. Wojciech Sokolowski and Associates), Volume II, (Bloomfield, CT: Kumarian Press, 2004). - (Chinese edition published by Peking University Press, 2007)

Global Civil Society: An Overview (with S. Wojciech Sokolowski & Regina List), (Baltimore, MD: Johns Hopkins Center for Civil Society Studies, 2003). Hungarian edition published as: A Civil Társadalom: Világnézetben (with S. Wojciech Sokolowski & Regina List), (Budapest, Hungary: Civitalis Egyesület, 2003).

The Resilient Sector: The State of Nonprofit America. (Washington, D.C.: Brookings Institution Press, 2003).

The State of Nonprofit America, (ed.) (Washington, D.C.: Brookings Institution Press, 2002).

The Tools of Government: A Guide to the New Governance. (New York: Oxford University Press, 2002). Global Civil Society: Dimensions of the Nonprofit Sector [Inaugural Edition] (with Helmut K. Anheier, Regina List, et al.) (Baltimore, MD: Johns Hopkins Center for Civil Society Studies, 1999). (Winner of the Virginia Hodgkinson Prize, Independent Sector, 2001) Spanish edition published as: Sociedad Civil Global: Dimensiones del Sector sin Fines de Lucro, With Helmut K. Anheier, Regina List, Stefan Toepler, S. Wojciech Sokolowski, and Associates (Madrid: Fundación BBVA, 2001). Chinese edition issued 2002

Recent Monographs and Articles: a Selection:

'Monographs

Impact of the 2007-09 Economic Recession on Nonprofit Organizations with Stephanie Geller. Listening Post Project Communiqué #14: Baltimore: The Johns Hopkins Center for Civil Society Studies, 29 June 2009.

Report on the Nonprofit Advocacy Roundtable, with Stephanie Geller. Listening Post Project Communiqué #13. Baltimore: The Johns Hopkins Center for Civil Society Studies, 22 April 2009.

"Shovel-Ready" but Stalled: Nonprofit Infrastructure Projects Ready for Economic Recovery Support with Stephanie Geller. Listening Post Project Communiqué # 12. Baltimore: Johns Hopkins Center for Civil Society Studies, 17 February 2009.

Nonprofit Policy Priorities for the New Administration with Stephanie Geller. Listening Post Project Communiqué #11: Baltimore: The Johns Hopkins Center for Civil Society Studies, 22 October 2008.

Articles

“Survival Mode” by Greg Hanscom, Johns Hopkins Magazine, pp. 36–39, Fall 2009.

“Volunteers and the Economic Downturn, Volunteering in America, August 2009.

"How to Rally an Army of Nonprofit Volunteers," Chronicle of Philanthropy, 15 January 2009.

"How to Finance Obama's Social-Innovation Fund," Chronicle of Philanthropy, 2 July 2009.

“Third-Party Government: The New Normal in Government and Nonprofit Operations”, with Helmut Anheier and Stefan Toepler, Encyclopedia of Civil Society, February 2009.

The Chronicle of Philanthropy Nonprofits to the Rescue, February 2009
