= Bangour Village Hospital =

- NHS Lothian
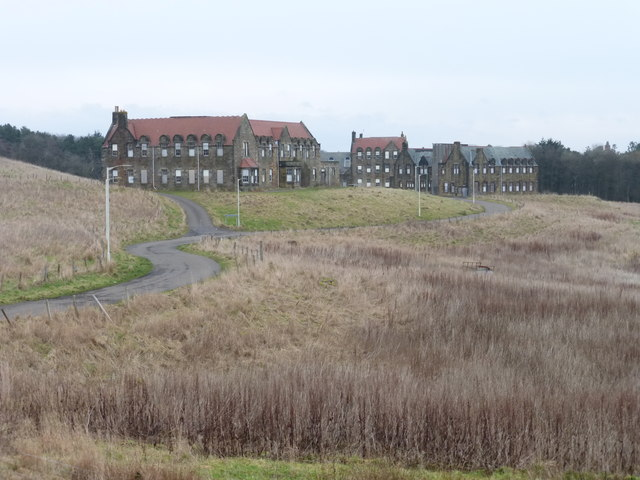
- Old buildings at Bangour Village Hospital

- Shown in West Lothian

Geography
- Location: Dechmont, West Lothian, Scotland, United Kingdom
- Coordinates: 55°55′25″N 3°33′00″W

Organisation
- Care system: Public NHS
- Type: Psychiatric

History
- Founded: 1906
- Closed: 2004

Links
- Lists: Hospitals in Scotland

Bangour Village Hospital was a psychiatric hospital located west of Dechmont in West Lothian, Scotland. During the First World War it formed part of the much larger Edinburgh War Hospital.

== History ==
The hospital was modelled on the village system of patient care, the best example of which is the Alt-Scherbitz hospital at Schkeuditz in Germany which was developed in the 1870s. It was designed by Hippolyte Blanc and officially opened as the Edinburgh District Asylum in October 1906. At the centre of the site was an Edwardian Baroque hall. The site also incorporated a power station, workshops, a bakery, stores, a kitchen and a laundry.

The hospital was requisitioned by the War Office during the First World War but reverted to psychiatric work between the wars. A Romanesque style church, designed by Harold Ogle Tarbolton, was built between 1924 and 1930.

During the Second World War the hospital was occupied by the War Office again and the patients were evacuated to Hartwoodhill Hospital

Temporary marquees and prefabricated huts were erected to cope with the demand for wartime bed space: the temporary facility became noted for its burns and plastic surgery unit which was established in 1940. After the war the temporary facility was developed as Bangour General Hospital.

After general medical services transferred to the newly-opened St John's Hospital in nearby Livingston, Bangour General Hospital closed in 1991. The Village Hospital also started to wind down after the opening of St Johns with the last remaining ward closing in 2004. The closed hospital was used as a filming location for the 2005 film The Jacket, starring Keira Knightley and Adrien Brody.

During September 2009, the hospital grounds were used as the site for "Exercise Green Gate", a counter-terrorist exercise run by the Scottish Government to test de-contamination procedures in the event of a nuclear, chemical or biological incident. This involved 250 volunteer "casualties" and 400 emergency staff.

Bangour Village Hospital
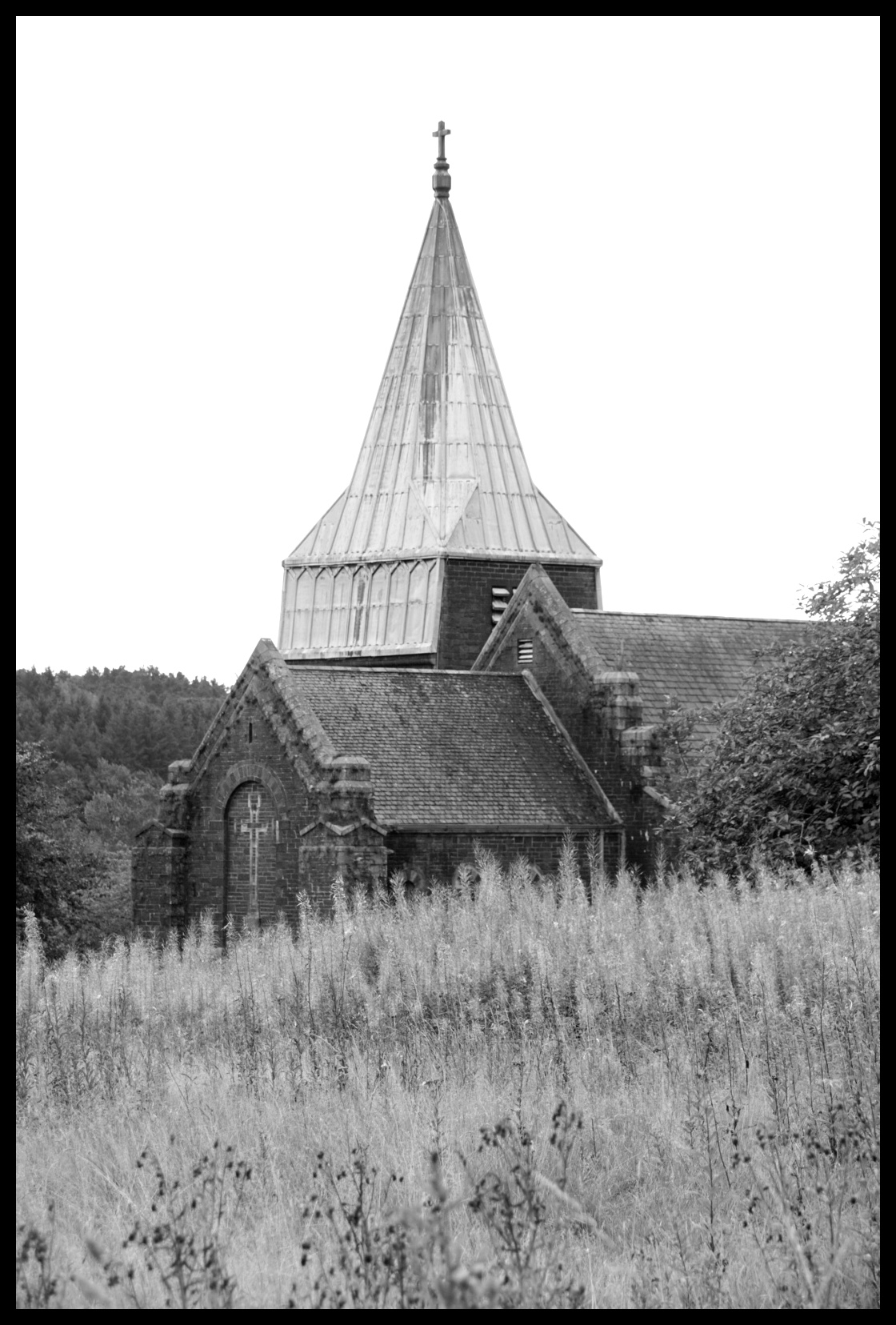
The Category A listed hospital church (completed 1930)

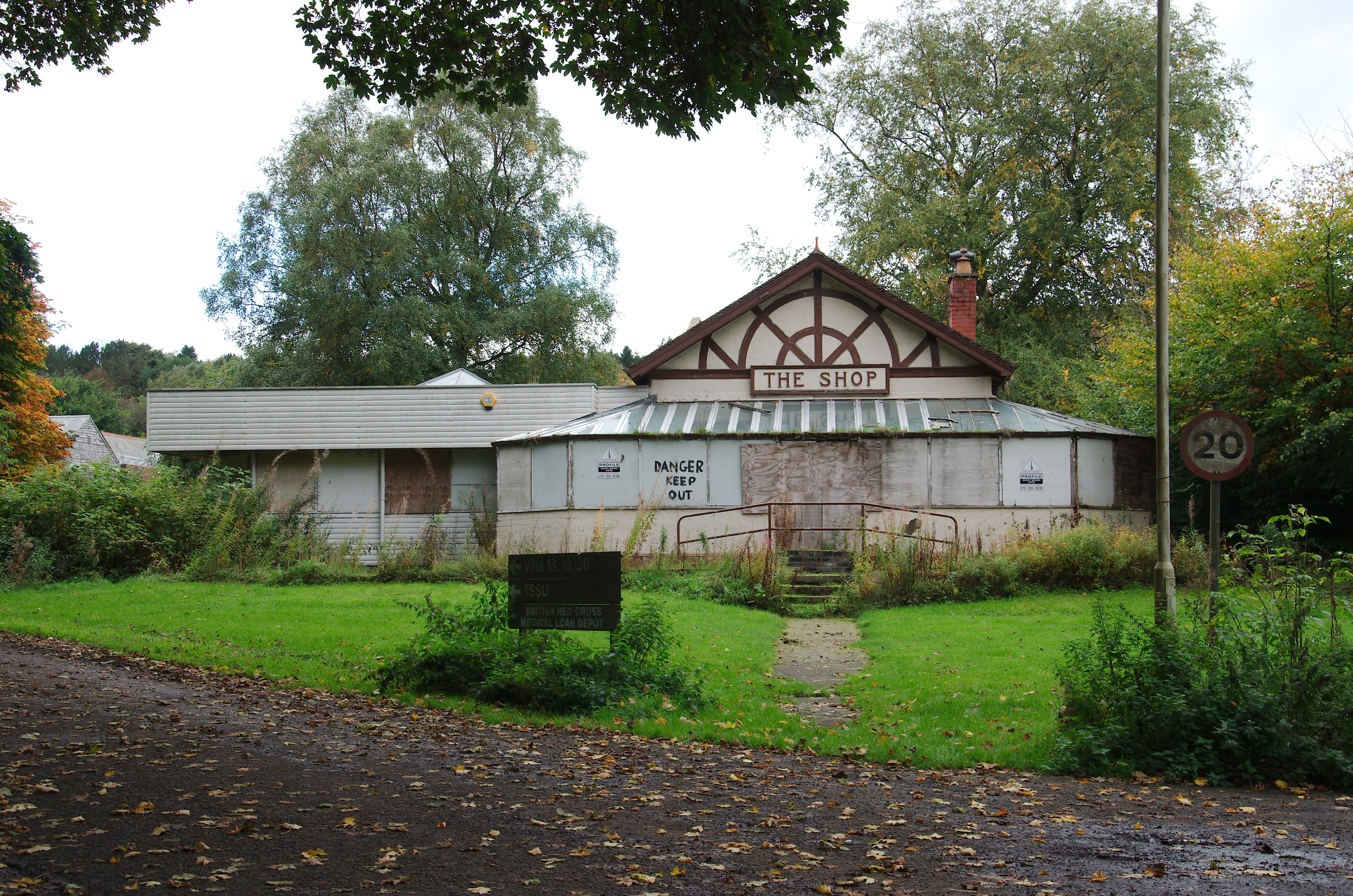
Former Village Hospital Shop

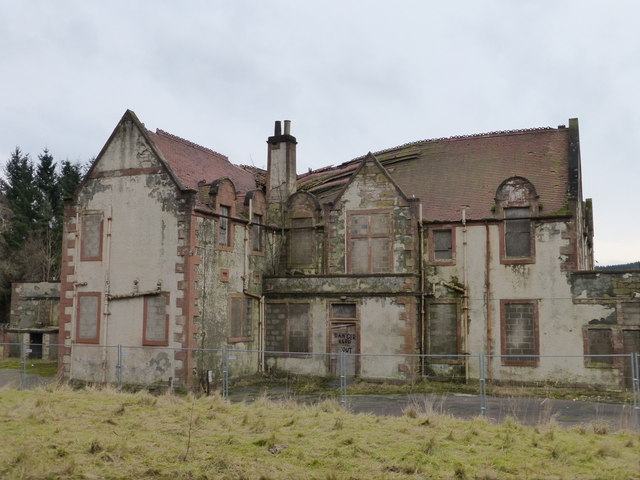
Derelict former hospital block

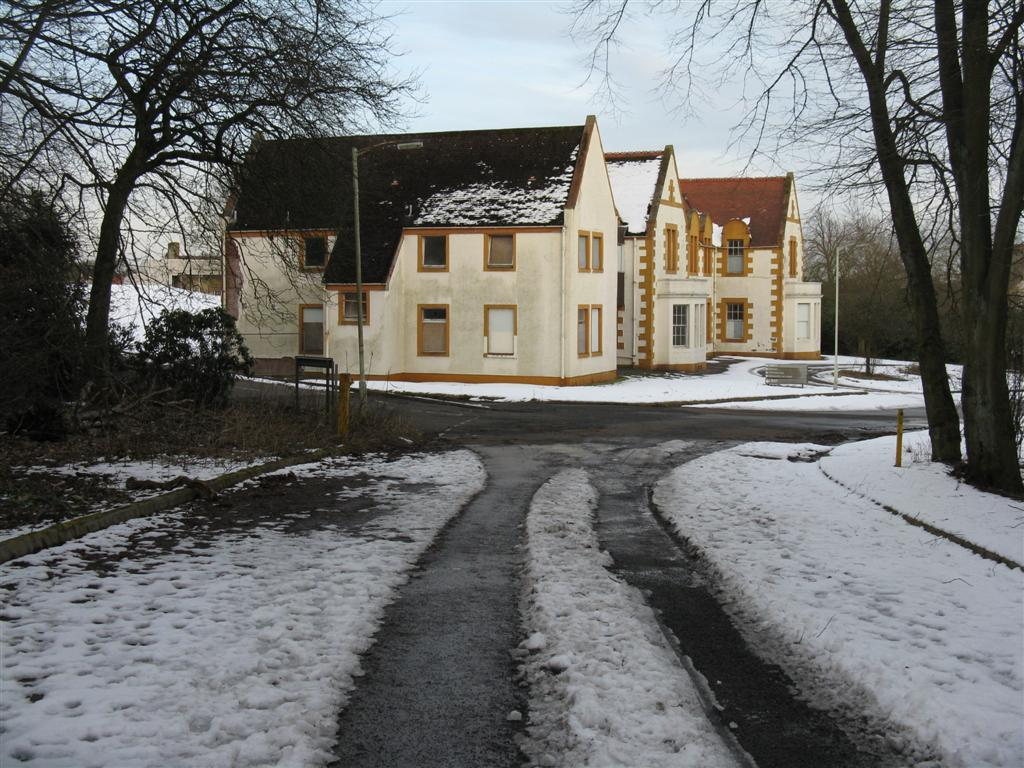
Derelict former villas at Bangour

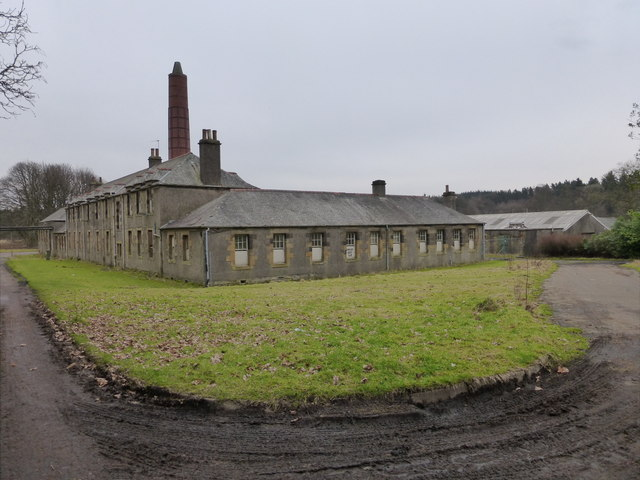
Derelict former boilerhouse

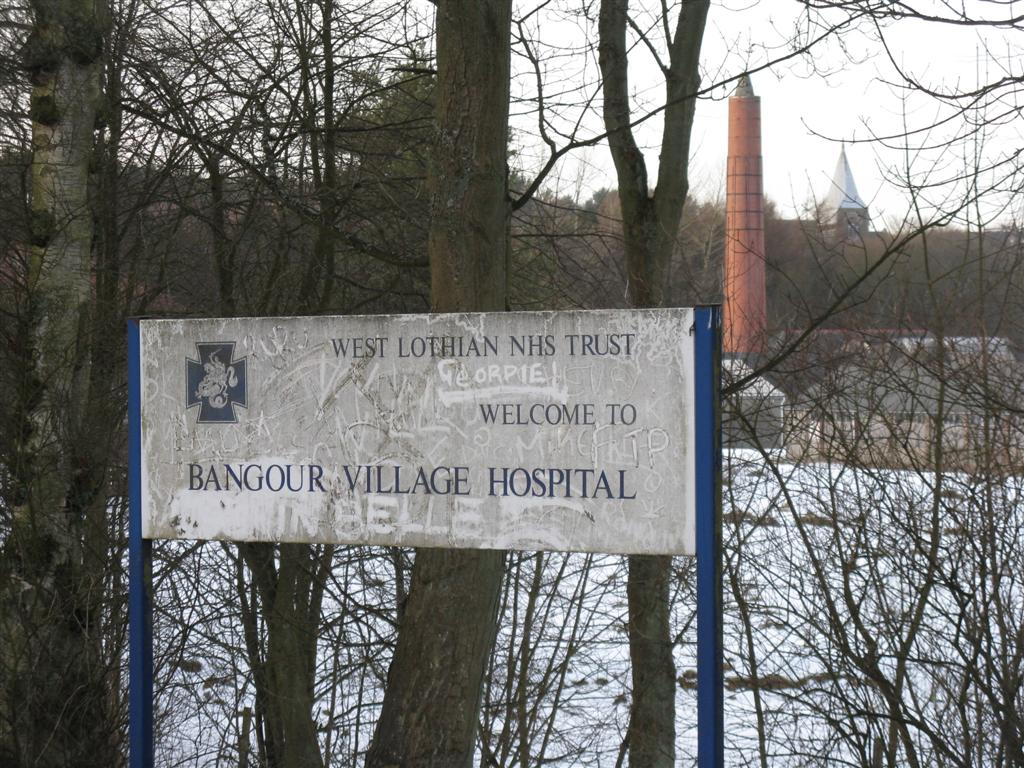
Former welcome sign

=== Bangour Village ===
On 1 October 2015, planning permission for a residential and mixed use redevelopment of the former hospital site was sought under the new settlement name 'Bangour Village'. The application noted some of the listed buildings would require full demolition in a subsequent application, including villas 7,8,9 and 21, with other buildings potentially proposed for partial demolition. In early 2020, it was confirmed that five of the listed buildings on site were in very poor condition and were planned to be demolished, while the remaining ten buildings were due to be redeveloped for housing. The first permission in principle for the development was given in March 2021 which allowed Allanwater Developments (Bangour) Ltd (then owners) to demolish 4 Category C listed buildings and partially demolish the B listed nurses' home. The plans also included provision for a district heating system, a new village shop and a new primary school (incorporating the Category A listed recreation hall). While some demolition took place, construction was delayed.

In April 2024, RoundShield (an investment company) and the Ambassador Group (estate agents) announced that they had secured funding of £21 million for a large-scale residential development on the site. This would initially include 51 "energy-efficient" new homes and the first 23 refurbished flats within the existing listed buildings, with 998 homes planned in total. The two companies also announced the sale of part of the site to Barratt Homes for further residential development. The subsequent plans saw a proposal for 395 houses and 82 flats as well as the conversion of listed buildings in the form of another 63 flats. The planning process decision was delayed in October 2024. However, in November 2024, the final plans for the Bangour Village estate were approved by West Lothian Council, with 976 of the planned homes approved.

In January 2025, Barratt Redrow commenced construction of the new properties, with the first new homes becoming available in September 2025.

== Railway branch line ==
When the hospital was built, road access was poor, and considerable volumes of coal and general stores were required for the running of the facility. A private railway line was built, branching from the former Edinburgh and Bathgate Railway line at Uphall, and terminating at Bangour railway station. It was authorised by the Edinburgh and District Lunacy Board Act of 30 July 1900, and it was opened to passengers on 19 June 1905.

During the First World War the road network was improved, and the railway became unnecessary; it was closed on 1 August 1921, although passenger services probably ceased on 4 May 1921.
