= Richard Gaynor =

American physician

Richard B. Gaynor is an American physician specializing in hematology-oncology, educator, drug developer, and business executive. He served as an associate professor of medicine at UCLA School of Medicine (Los Angeles, CA) for nearly a decade, and subsequently as an endowed Professor of Medicine and Microbiology at the University of Texas Southwestern Medical School prior to joining the pharmaceutical industry in 2002. His research on NF-κB, IκB kinase, and other mechanisms regulating viral and cellular gene expression has been covered in leading subject reviews. He has been a top executive at several pharmaceutical companies, with respect to the development and clinical testing of novel anticancer drugs and cell therapies. For over a decade and a half, he worked at Eli Lilly and Company, where he became the Senior Vice President of Oncology Clinical Development and Medical Affairs in 2013. Gaynor was President of R&D at Neon Therapeutics from 2016 to 2020, when he became the President of BioNTech US, both pharmaceutical companies headquartered in Cambridge, MA. His honors include being elected a member of the American Society for Clinical Investigation, and the Association of American Physicians.

== Education ==
In 1971 Gaynor graduated with a BS in biology from Texas Tech University (Lubbock, TX). In 1975, he graduated with an MD from the University of Texas Southwestern Medical School (Dallas, TX). This was followed by internship (1975–1976) and residency (1976–1978) in internal medicine at Parkland Memorial Hospital (Dallas, TX). From 1978 to 1981 he was a Fellow at the Division of Hematology-Oncology, Department of Medicine, UCLA School of Medicine (Los Angeles, CA). TX).

== Career ==
In 1982 Gaynor became an assistant professor of medicine at the Division of Hematology-Oncology, Department of Medicine, UCLA School of Medicine (Los Angeles, CA), where he further became an associate professor of medicine in 1988 to 1991. In 1991 he moved to the UT Southwestern Medical School (Dallas, TX), where he became associate professor of medicine and microbiology, Andrea L. Simmons Distinguished Chair in Cancer Virology, and chief of the Division of Molecular Virology. At UT he further became a full professor and chief of the Division of Hematology-Oncology in 1993, then interim director (1997–1999), and director of the Harold C. Simmons Comprehensive Cancer Center from 1999 to 2002. During his time in Dallas, he was also a staff physician at the Dallas Veterans Affairs Medical Center, and an attending physician at Zale Lipshy University Hospital.

In 2002, moved from UT and joined Eli Lilly and Company (Indianapolis, IN), where he remained until 2016, in positions as Vice President of Cancer Research and Clinical Investigation, and Senior Vice President of Global Oncology, Clinical and Product Development and Medical Affairs. During his tenure at Lilly, the firm was involved in FDA approval of Gemcitabine for the treatment of ovarian cancer, and directed clinical trials of Ramucirumab, Pemetrexed, Cetuximab, and Abemaciclib for a number of cancer treatment indications.

He is the author of 140 publications indexed on Scopus (February 2022). His research partly focused on the dysregulation of the nuclear factor NF-κB pathway in inflammation, autoimmunity, immunodeficiency, and neoplasia, and the options for its therapeutic targeting. His discoveries include the identification of IκB kinase as a second site of the anti-inflammatory action of aspirin. His laboratory made noted insights into the regulation of retroviral gene expresión, some of which are referred on current entries on TAF1, MNAT1, and TARBP1. In 2014, he co-authored the AACR Cancer Progress Report.

As a business executive, Gaynor was President of Research and Development at Neon Therapeutics, (Cambridge, MA) from 2016 to 2020. Then, he became the President and Chief of Research and Development at BioNTech US (Cambridge, MA), his current position. He is a member of the board of directors at Damon Runyon Cancer Research Foundation, Alkermes PLC, Infinity Pharmaceuticals, and Zai Labs. He is also a member of the Scientific Advisory Board at Leap Therapeutics. He was also a member of technical boards of NPOs such as Damon Runyon Cancer Foundation, Walther Cancer Foundation the American Association for Cancer Research, and Stand Up to Cancer.

== Works ==
=== Research papers ===
Some of Gaynor's most cited research papers are:

- Ou, S. H.; Wu, F.; Harrich, D.; García-Martínez, L. F.; Gaynor, R. B. (1995-06-01). "Cloning and characterization of a novel cellular protein, TDP-43, that binds to human immunodeficiency virus type 1 TAR DNA sequence motifs". Journal of Virology. 69 (6): 3584–3596. doi:10.1128/JVI.69.6.3584-3596.1995. ISSN 0022-538X. PMC 189073. PMID 7745706
- Yin, Min-Jean; Yamamoto, Yumi; Gaynor, Richard B. (1998-11-01). "The anti-inflammatory agents aspirin and salicylate inhibit the activity of IκB kinase-β". Nature. 396 (6706): 77–80. doi:10.1038/23948. ISSN 0028-0836.
- Yamamoto, Y.; Gaynor, R. B. (2001-01-01). "Therapeutic potential of inhibition of the NF-kappaB pathway in the treatment of inflammation and cancer". The Journal of Clinical Investigation. 107 (2): 135–142. doi:10.1172/JCI11914. ISSN 0021-9738. PMC 199180. PMID 11160126
- Yamamoto, Yumi; Gaynor, Richard B. (2004-02-01). "IkappaB kinases: key regulators of the NF-kappaB pathway". Trends in Biochemical Sciences. 29 (2): 72–79. doi:10.1016/j.tibs.2003.12.003. ISSN 0968-0004. PMID 15102433
