= Southwestern Medical District =

- District of Dallas, Texas
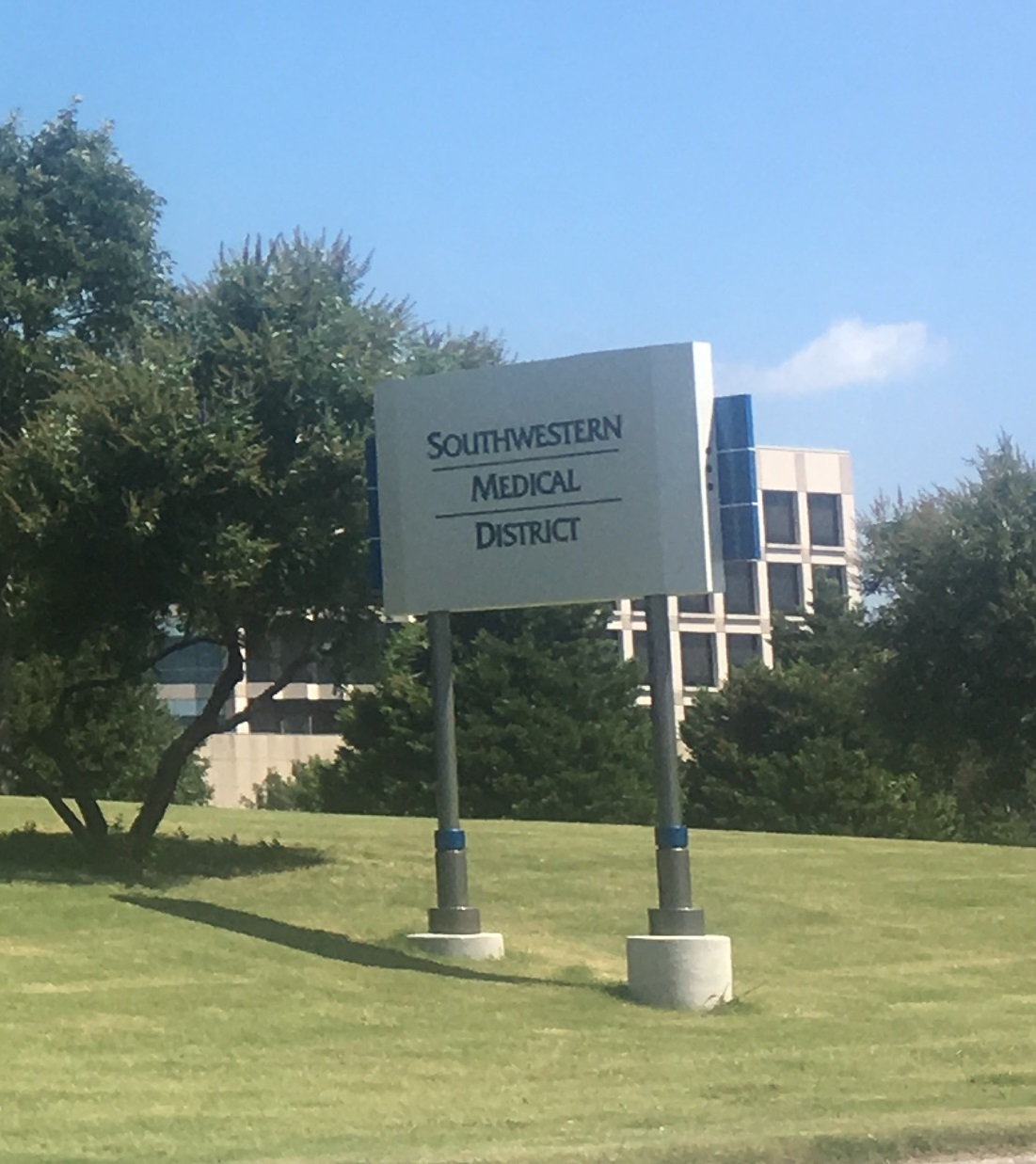

The Southwestern Medical District is an area or neighborhood located immediately to the northwest of downtown Dallas, Texas. It consists of 1,000 acres (400 ha) of medical-related facilities between I-35E and The Dallas North Tollway.

The medical center includes multiple research, higher education, and clinical institutions, and employs over 35,000 people and attracts nearly 3 million patient visits a year to its clinics and hospitals, providing services from pediatric preventive care to geriatric services, from lifesaving emergency care to heart transplants.

== Healthcare institutions ==
Major institutions with facilities and offices in the area are:

- American Heart Association
- Parkland Memorial Hospital
- Children's Medical Center Dallas
- William P. Clements Jr. University Hospital
- Scottish Rite Hospital for Children

== Academic and research institutions ==
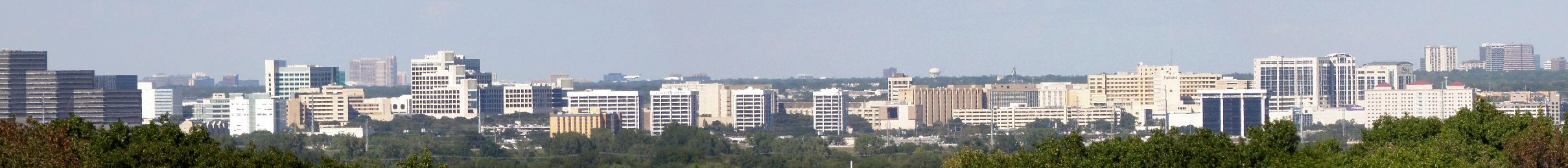

- Texas Woman’s University (Dallas campus)
- UT Dallas Callier Center
- Center for BrainHealth
- University of Texas Southwestern Medical Center
- Texas Tech University Health Sciences Center at Dallas
- UTHealth School of Public Health in Dallas

== See also ==
- South Texas Medical Center
- Texas Medical Center
