= Robert Lenkinski =

Canadian scientist

Robert Lenkinski (born 1947) is a Canadian scientist, currently the Charles A. and Elizabeth Ann Sanders Chair in Translational Research and works as a Professor in Medical Science at University of Texas Southwestern Medical Center.
