= TARBP1 =

Protein-coding gene in humans

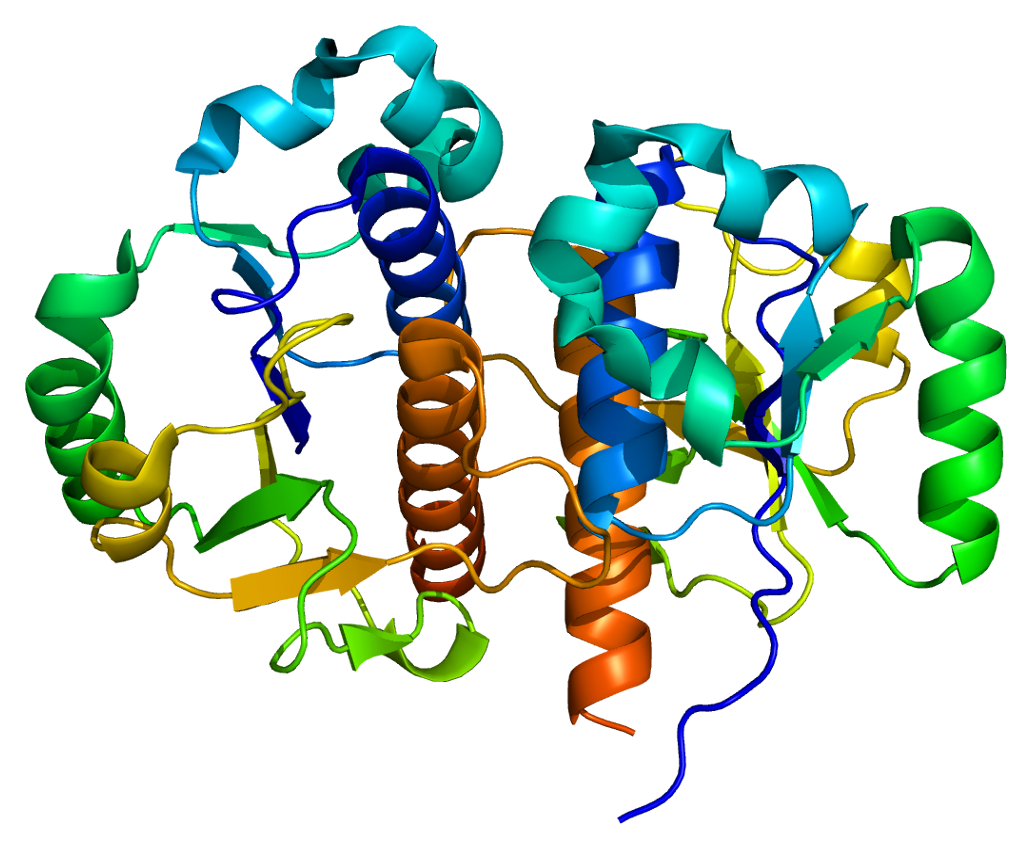

Identifiers
- Aliases: TARBP1, TRM3, TRP-185, TRP185, TAR (HIV-1) RNA binding protein 1, TRMT3
- External IDs: OMIM: 605052; MGI: 4936930; GeneCards: TARBP1
Available structures
PDB	Ortholog search: PDBe RCSB
PDB	List of PDB id codes 2HA8
Enzyme activity
EC #	BRENDA	ExPASy	KEGG	MetaCyc
2.1.1.34	↗	↗	↗	↗

Gene location (Human)
Chr.	Chromosome 1 (human)
Band	1q42.2	Start	234,391,313 bp
Band	1q42.2	End	234,479,179 bp

Gene location (Mouse)
Chr.	Chromosome 8 (mouse)
Band	8|8 E2	Start	127,152,068 bp
Band	8|8 E2	End	127,201,804 bp
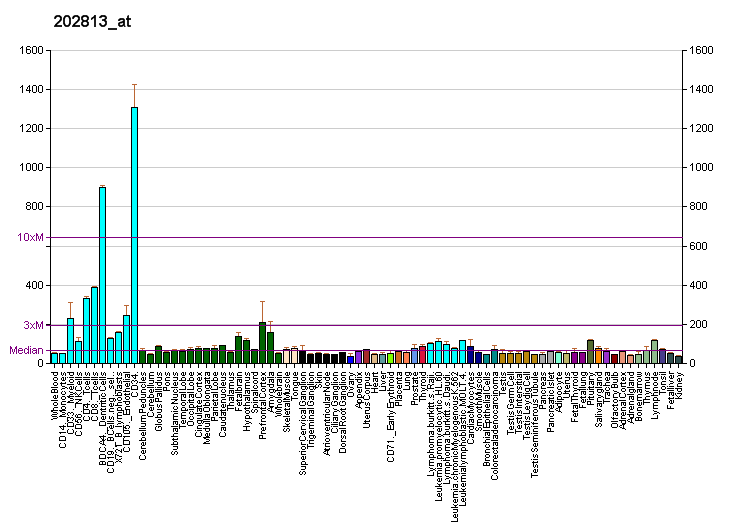
RNA expression pattern
Bgee	Human / Mouse (ortholog); Top expressed in: right hemisphere of cerebellum; right uterine tube; right frontal lobe; Brodmann area 9; nucleus accumbens; rectum; pituitary gland; anterior pituitary; caudate nucleus; body of pancreas / Top expressed in: aortic valve; hair follicle; ascending aorta; cumulus cell; Paneth cell; primitive streak; secondary oocyte; primary oocyte; ureter; tail of embryo; More reference expression data
BioGPS	More reference expression data
Gene ontology
Molecular function	methyltransferase activity; RNA methyltransferase activity; transferase activity; tRNA (guanine) methyltransferase activity; RNA binding; rRNA (guanosine-2'-O-)-methyltransferase activity
Cellular component	nucleus
Biological process	regulation of transcription by RNA polymerase II; methylation; RNA processing; tRNA methylation; enzyme-directed rRNA 2'-O-methylation
Sources:Amigo / QuickGO
Orthologs
Databases	NCBI: entry; OMA: entry
Species	Human	Mouse
Entrez	6894	212728
Ensembl	ENSG00000059588	ENSMUSG00000090290
UniProt	Q13395	E9Q368
RefSeq (mRNA)	NM_005646	NM_001159907
RefSeq (protein)	NP_005637	NP_001153379
Location (UCSC)	Chr 1: 234.39 – 234.48 Mb	Chr 8: 127.15 – 127.2 Mb
PubMed search
- Wikidata
View/Edit Human	View/Edit Mouse

Probable methyltransferase TARBP1 is an enzyme that in humans is encoded by the TARBP1 gene.

HIV-1, the causative agent of acquired immunodeficiency syndrome (AIDS), contains an RNA genome that produces a chromosomally integrated DNA during the replicative cycle. Activation of HIV-1 gene expression by the transactivator Tat is dependent on an RNA regulatory element (TAR) located downstream of the transcription initiation site. This element forms a stable stem-loop structure and can be bound by either the protein encoded by this gene or by RNA polymerase II. This protein may act to disengage RNA polymerase II from TAR during transcriptional elongation. Alternatively spliced transcripts of this gene may exist, but their full-length natures have not been determined.
