= William P. Clements Jr. University Hospital =

- Southwestern Medical District
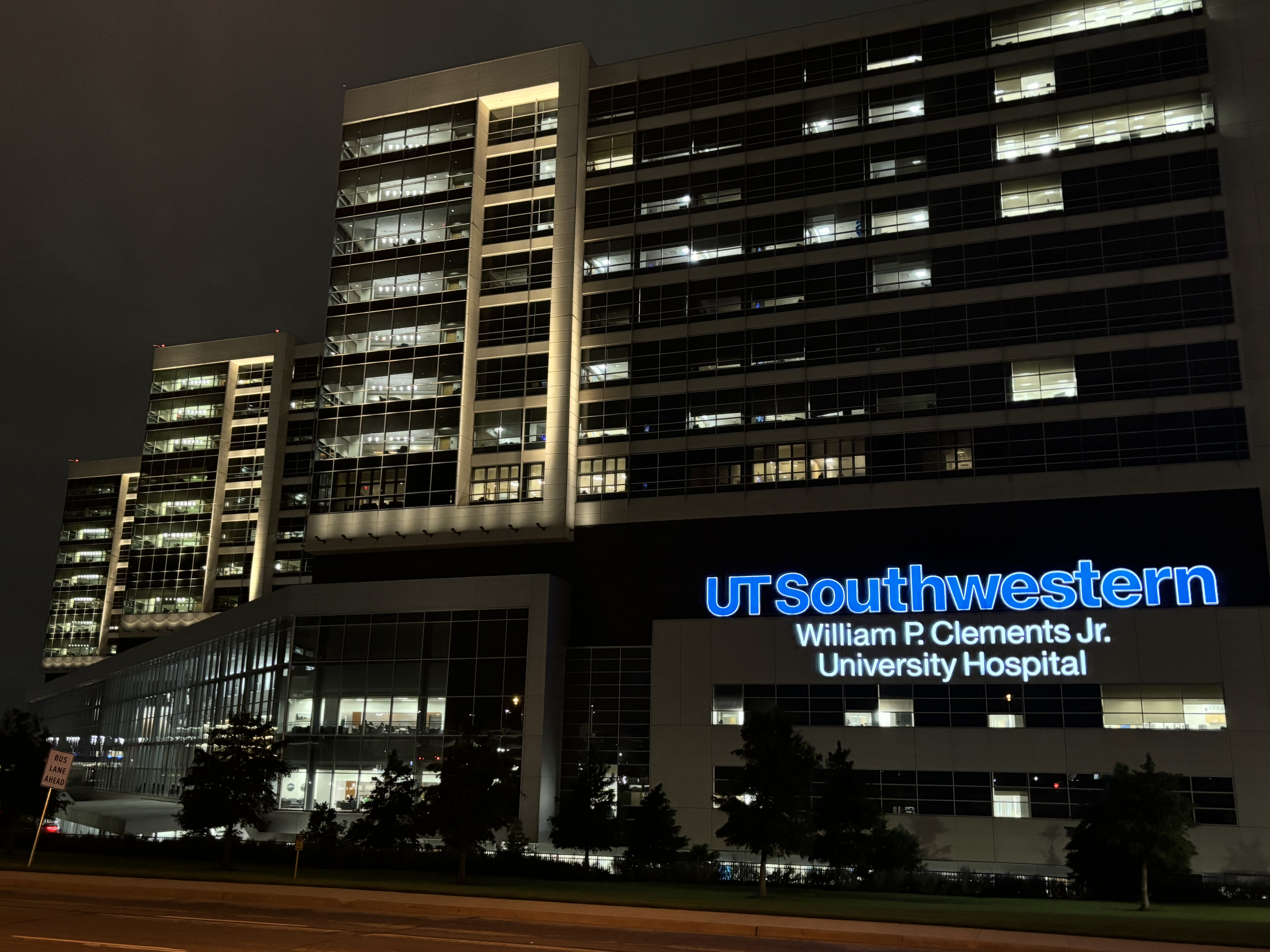

Geography
- Location: 6201 Harry Hines Blvd, Dallas, Texas, United States
- Coordinates: 32°49′07″N 96°50′55″W

Organization
- Type: General hospital and Teaching hospital
- Affiliated university: UT Southwestern Medical Center

Services
- Beds: 751

History
- Founded: 2014

Links
- Website: utswmed.org/locations/clements/william-p-clements-jr-university-hospital
- Lists: Hospitals in Texas

William P. Clements Jr. University Hospital is a hospital in the Southwestern Medical District in Dallas, Texas. It is one of the main teaching hospitals of the University of Texas Southwestern Medical Center.

== History ==
The hospital is named in honor of former Texas Governor William P. Clements Jr., who in 2009 made a landmark $100 million contribution to the Southwestern Medical Foundation, the largest single gift in the foundation's history.

The hospital's three towers were built on a total $1.2 Billion budget between 2014 and 2020.

The Zale Lipshy Pavilion – William P. Clements Jr. University Hospital at 5151 Harry Hines Blvd. is part of William P. Clements Jr. University Hospital.

== Rankings ==
In 2024, the hospital was ranked the following in specific specialties in the United States by ‘’Newsweek’’:

- 32nd in Neurological
- 34th in Cancer
- 37th in Cardiac

In 2024 the hospital was also ranked as the top hospital in the Dallas-Fort Worth area by U.S. News & World Report.
