= University of Texas Southwestern Medical Center =

Public academic health science center in Dallas, Texas

The University of Texas Southwestern Medical Center
- Type: Public academic health science center
- Established: 1943
- Parent institution: University of Texas System
- Endowment: $2.36 billion (2024)
- Budget: $6.5 billion (2025)
- President: Daniel K. Podolsky
- Dean: Wei-Ping Lee
- Faculty: 4,175 (3,034 full-time, 333 part-time, 808 voluntary)
- Students: 1,862
- Postgraduates: 2,008
- Location: Dallas, Texas, United States; 32°48′45″N 96°50′18″W
- Campus: Urban, 231 acres (0.9 km^{2})
- Website: www.utsouthwestern.edu

The University of Texas Southwestern Medical Center (UT Southwestern or UTSW) is a public academic health science center in Dallas, Texas. With approximately 23,000 employees, more than 3,000 full-time faculty, and nearly 4 million outpatient visits per year, UT Southwestern is the largest medical school in the University of Texas System and the State of Texas.

UT Southwestern's operating budget in 2021 was more than US$4.1 billion, and is the largest medical institution in the Dallas–Fort Worth Metroplex (and therefore North Texas region), annually training about 3,800 medical, graduate, and health professions students, residents, and postdoctoral fellows. UT Southwestern Research Programs amounted to US$634.9 million in 2022.

UT Southwestern's faculty also provide services at Scottish Rite for Children, VA North Texas Health Care System, and other affiliated hospitals and community clinics in the North Texas region. Faculty and residents provide care in more than 80 specialties to more than 100,000 hospitalized patients, more than 360,000 emergency room cases, and oversee nearly 4 million outpatient visits a year, including more than US$106.7 million in unreimbursed clinical services annually.

Through the major hospitals affiliated with UT Southwestern in the city of Dallas, the medical center also has a large presence throughout North Texas, including the cities of Coppell, Fort Worth, Frisco, Irving, and Plano.

UT Southwestern in Dallas has the largest medical residency program in the United States. In 2016, UT Southwestern began providing additional care through Southwestern Health Resources, a network combining the systems of Texas Health Resources and UT Southwestern. The network comprises 31 hospitals, 300 clinics, and more than 3,000 physicians and caregivers.

== History ==
=== Establishment and founding ===
Southwestern Medical College as it appeared at its founding in the 1940s. Animal facilities are seen in the lower right.

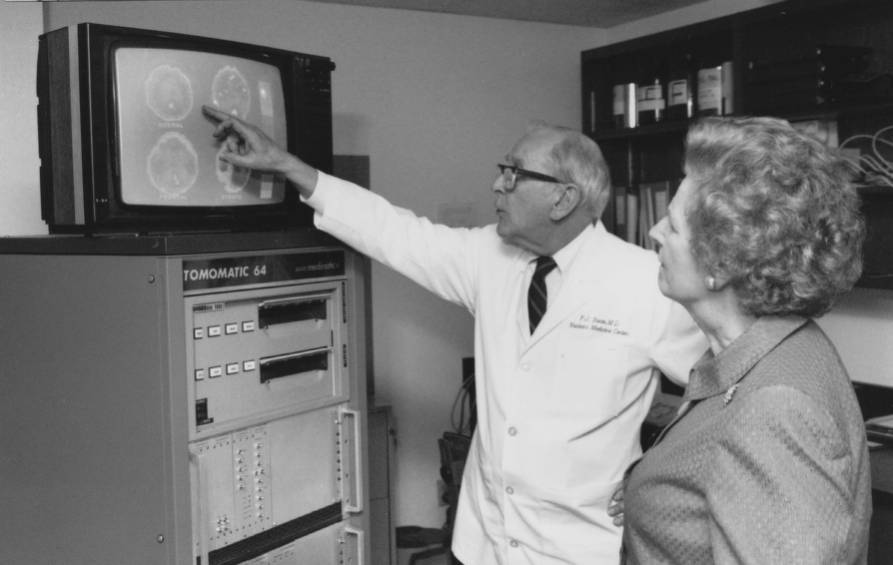
Margaret Thatcher visiting UTSW Radiology in 1991. Frederick Bonte, dean of the medical school, describes a brain SPECT image to the British Prime Minister. UTSW was one of the early pioneers of blood pool imaging using Nuclear Medicine.

Under the leadership of Edward H. Cary and Karl Hoblitzelle, a group of Dallas citizens organized Southwestern Medical Foundation in 1939 to promote medical education and research in Dallas and the region. When Baylor University moved its school of medicine from Dallas to Houston in 1943, the foundation formally established Southwestern Medical College as the 68th medical school in the United States. Founded during World War II, the medical school was initially housed in a handful of abandoned barracks.

=== Affiliation with University of Texas ===
When a new state medical school was proposed after World War II, leaders of Southwestern Medical Foundation offered the college's equipment, library, and certain restricted funds to the University of Texas System, provided the university would locate its new medical branch in Dallas. The Board of Regents accepted this offer, and in 1949 the college became Southwestern Medical School of The University of Texas. In 1954 the name was changed to The University of Texas Southwestern Medical School. The present campus site on Harry Hines Boulevard was occupied in 1955 upon the completion of the Edward H. Cary Building. This placed the medical school faculty next to the then-newly built Parkland Memorial Hospital.

In November 1972 the name and scope of the medical school were changed with its reorganization into The University of Texas Health Science Center at Dallas. This provided for coordinated but separate medical, graduate, and undergraduate components.

=== Addition of Howard Hughes Medical Institute ===
In 1986 the Howard Hughes Medical Institute opened a research facility on the campus. Its investigators also hold faculty positions in the basic science departments of the Medical School and Graduate School.

=== Name change and brand recognition ===
In October 1987 the UT System Board of Regents approved changing the name of the health science center to The University of Texas Southwestern Medical Center at Dallas. The Center consists of four degree-granting institutions: UT Southwestern Medical School, UT Southwestern Graduate School of Biomedical Sciences, UT Southwestern School of Health Professions, and UT Southwestern O'Donnell School of Public Health.

=== Rapid physical expansion and growth ===
Since the late 1960s the university has added more than 6 million square feet of new construction. The 60-acre South Campus includes 20 buildings housing classrooms, laboratories, offices, the extensive University of Texas Southwestern Medical Center Library, an auditorium, and a large outpatient center. Affiliated hospitals adjacent to the campus are Zale Lipshy Pavilion, Parkland Memorial Hospital, William P. Clements Jr. University Hospital, and Children's Medical Center Dallas, and Children's Medical Center Plano.

In 1987 the John D. and Catherine T. MacArthur Foundation gave the university 30 acres (120,000 m^{2}) near the South Campus for future expansion. A 20-year master plan for the site, designed by Edward Larrabee Barnes and John MY Lee and Partners, called North Campus, called for six research towers, a support-services building, an energy plant, and underground parking, in addition to the Mary Nell and Ralph B. Rogers Magnetic Resonance Center and the Moncrief Radiation Oncology Center.

Three research towers and an elevated campus connector, linking the South Campus with the North Campus, were completed in the 1990s. A fourth 14-story research tower was completed in 2005, followed by a 12-story research tower in 2011. In 1999 the university purchased an additional 50 acres from the MacArthur Foundation, and a portion was used to create an on-campus student-housing complex of 156 apartments. A second phase of 126 units opened in 2004. In 2008, the university purchased the 24-acre Exchange Park adjacent to the North Campus.

In 2008, UT Southwestern announced plans to open the BioCenter at Southwestern Medical District, a facility to commercialize university technologies and attract biotech companies to the area.

Also in 2008, UT Southwestern acquired the Exchange Park site and renamed it the Paul M. Bass Administrative and Clinical Center on the North Campus. The center was named in honor of Mr. Bass, chairman emeritus of the Southwestern Medical Foundation, who served in that role until 2008. With this property, the campus grew to 9 million square feet of laboratory, clinical, educational, and administrative space, covering 387 acres.

In 2009, the $186 million Biomedical Research Building (NL Building on the North Campus) opened. The building is the largest LEED (Leadership in Energy and Environmental Design) silver-certified laboratory space in Texas. UT Southwestern opened its William P. Clements Jr. University Hospital on Dec. 6, 2014, along with the decommissioning of the 50-year-old St. Paul University Hospital. UTSW opened its Radiation Oncology center in 2017. In March 2022, a $100 million gift, made by the O’Donnell Foundation, endowed a new school of public health. It is the largest gift to any school of public health at a public university in the U.S.

In 2023, UT Southwestern announced a multi-billion dollar plan for a new pediatric campus for Children's Medical Center Dallas to be built in 2031 adjacent to the main university hospital.

In 2022, UTSW kicked off construction of a 296 psychiatric hospital south of the current Children's medical campus.

== Affiliated health care institutions ==
Major UTSW affiliated hospitals
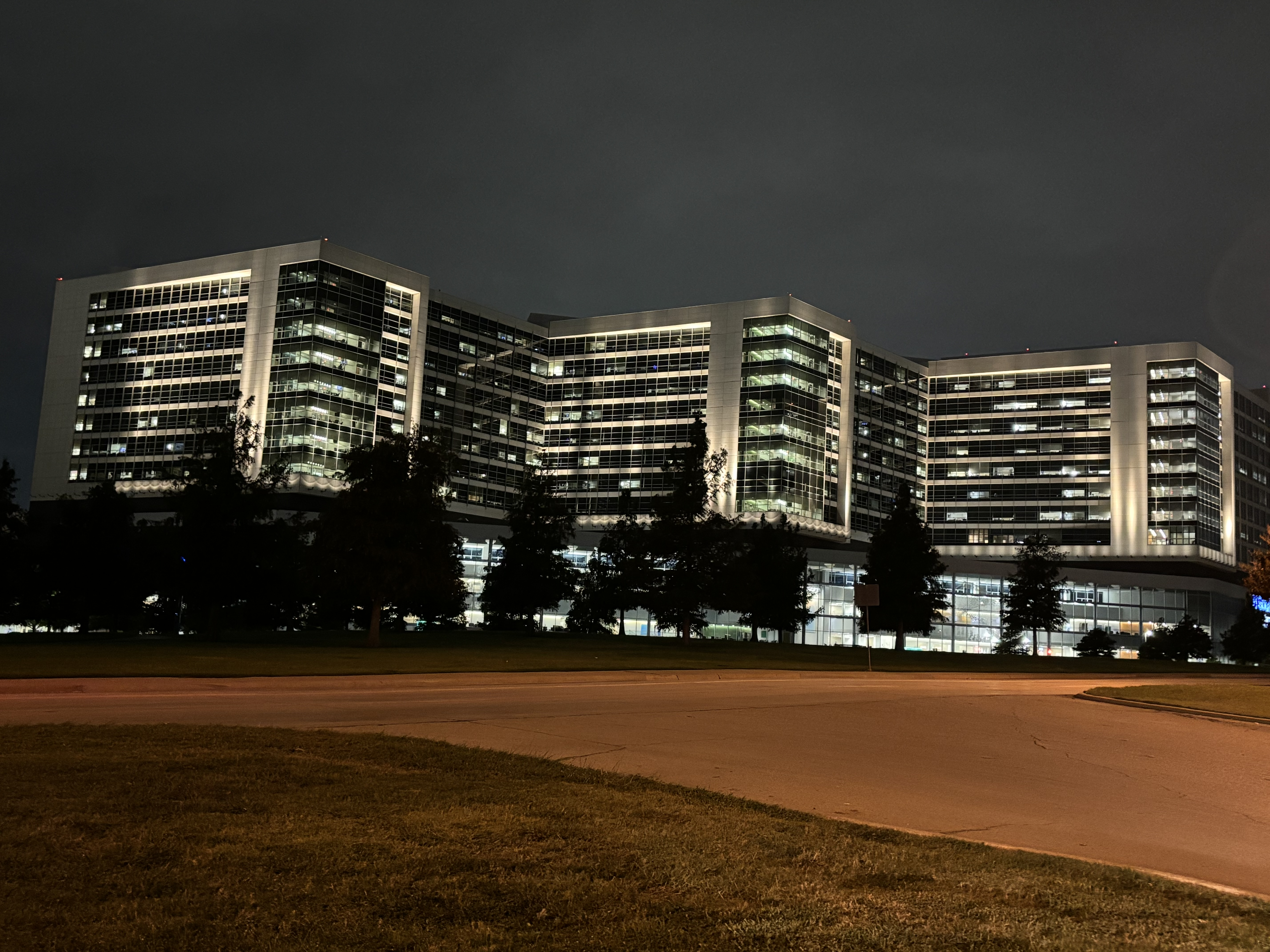
William P. Clements Jr. University Hospital

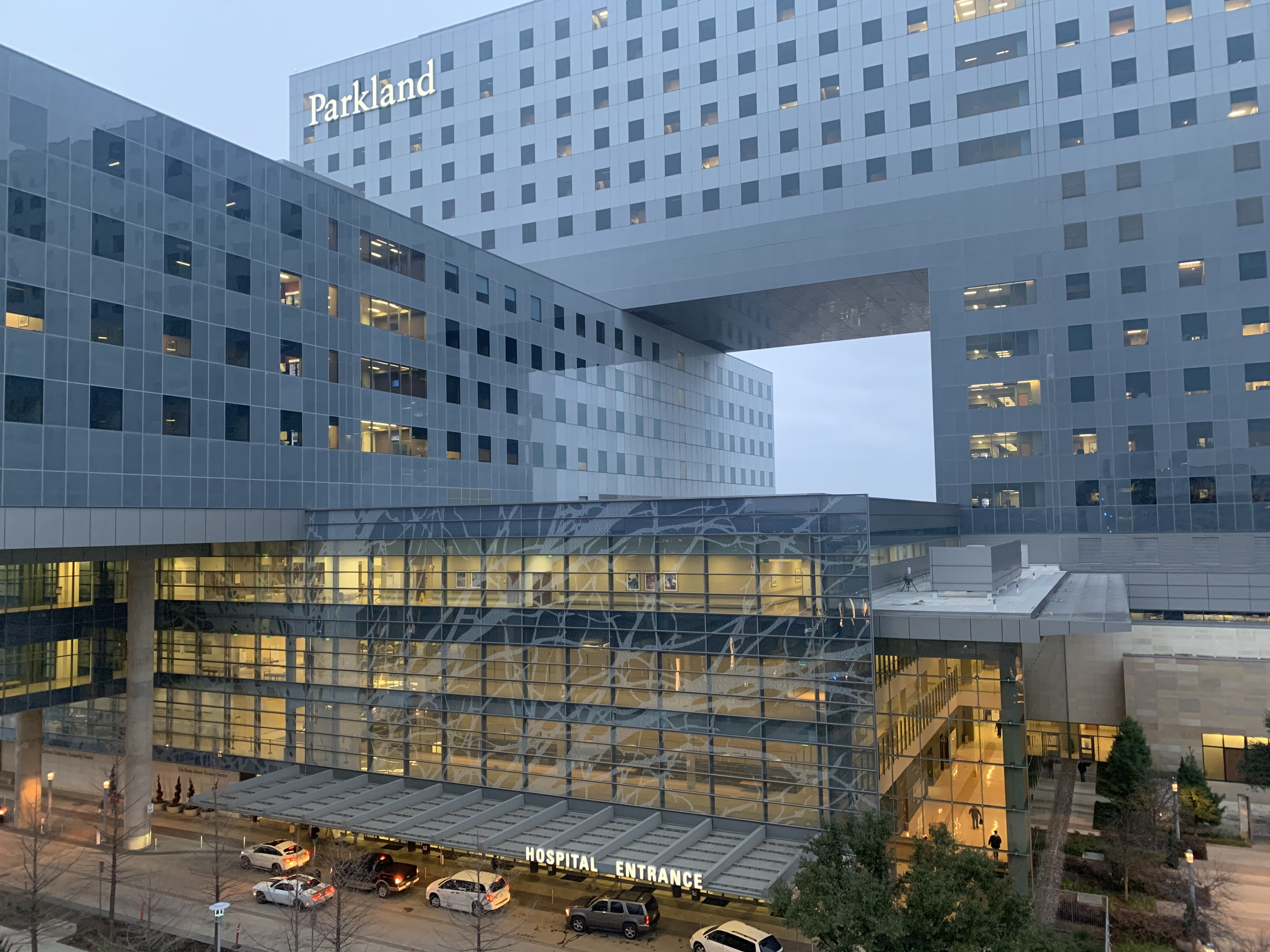
Parkland Memorial Hospital

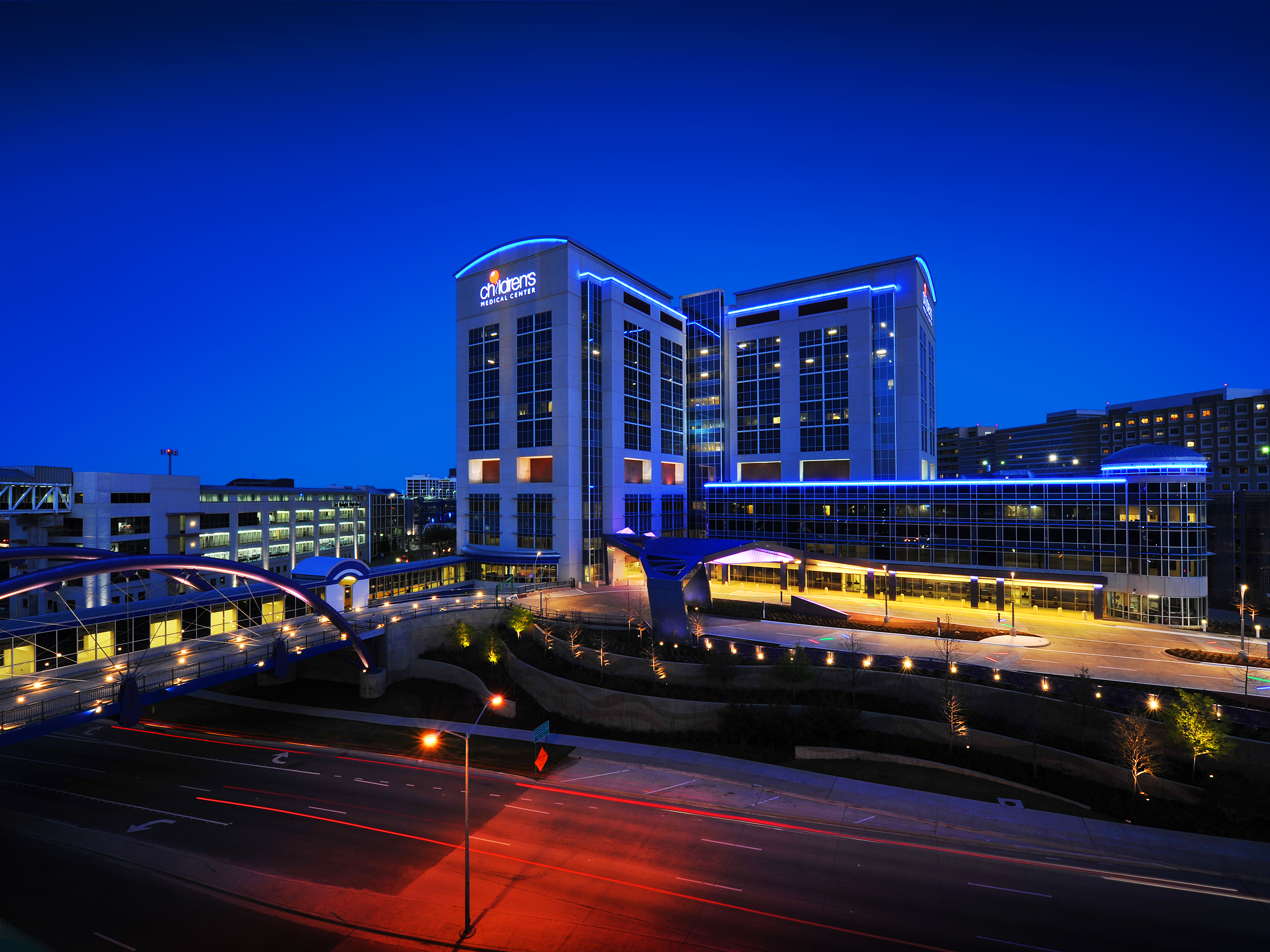
Children's Medical Center Dallas

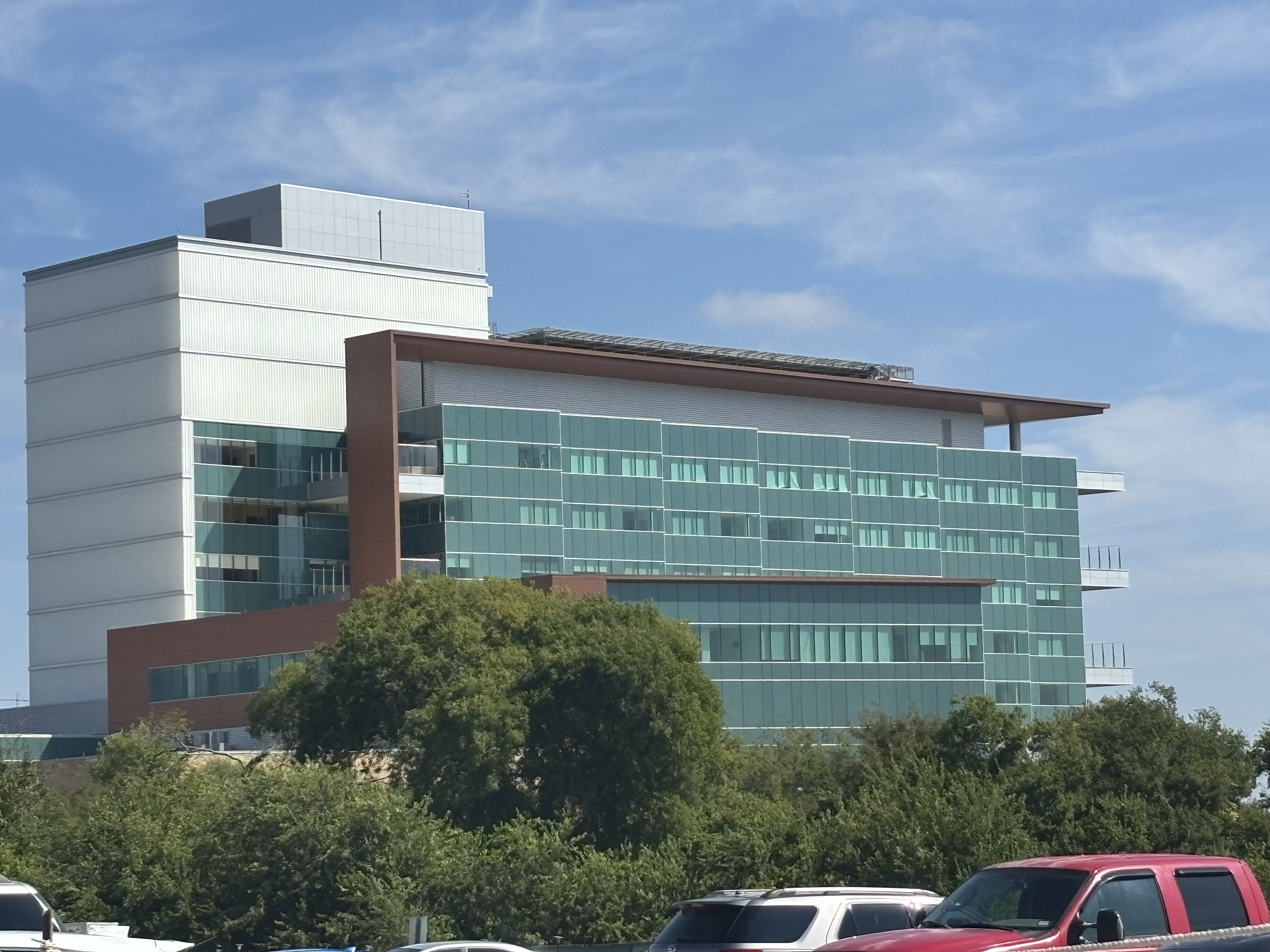
Children's Medical Center Plano

Major affiliations:

- Parkland Memorial Hospital (The primary teaching institution of UT Southwestern, whose faculty is responsible for caring for the hospital's patients, this 2.1 million-square-foot acute care facility has 882 single-patient rooms, and more than 1 million patient visits each year).
- Children's Medical Center Dallas (The primary pediatric teaching hospital for UT Southwestern, this hospital is licensed for 490 beds, has more than 50 pediatric specialty programs, and is the only pediatric hospital in North Texas with a designated Level 1 trauma center).
- William P. Clements Jr. University Hospital (Opened in December 2014 and was expanded in December 2020 as the centerpiece of UT Southwestern's main campus. Together with the hospital's Zale Lipshy Pavilion, the 875-bed facility includes 124 adult ICU rooms, 63 emergency treatment rooms, 56 operating rooms, 42 inpatient rehab beds, 30 neonatal ICU rooms, 30 women's services suites, 23 inpatient psychiatric beds, 15 infusion rooms, and two nuclear medicine rooms, and it is a Joint Commission-certified advanced comprehensive stroke center).
- Dallas Veteran Affairs Medical Center (The U.S. Department of Veterans Affairs’ second largest health care system, it serves 38 Texas counties and two counties in southern Oklahoma, providing primary, tertiary, and long-term care. The 822-bed system has a Spinal Cord Injury Center, Domiciliary Care Program, and Community Living Center with a dedicated hospice unit).
- Texas Health Presbyterian Hospital Dallas (Part of the Texas Health Resources (THR) system, this 888-bed, acute-care facility was the first hospital in Dallas to receive Cycle IV Chest Pain accreditation from the Society of Cardiovascular Patient Care, and it is also accredited for emergency stroke care by The Joint Commission. In 2016, UT Southwestern and THR launched a clinically integrated health care network, Southwestern Health Resources to provide increased access to primary and specialized care to North Texas residents, from preventive measures to advanced interventions).
- Richardson Regional Medical Center
- Texas Scottish Rite Hospital for Children
- John Peter Smith Hospital of Fort Worth
- Children's Medical Center Plano expanded its facility in 2024 to include 212 beds, the largest in Plano, Texas.
- Texas Behavioral Health Center at UT Southwestern, to be completed in 2025.

== Clinical services ==
Some outpatient facilities where UT Southwestern faculty practice
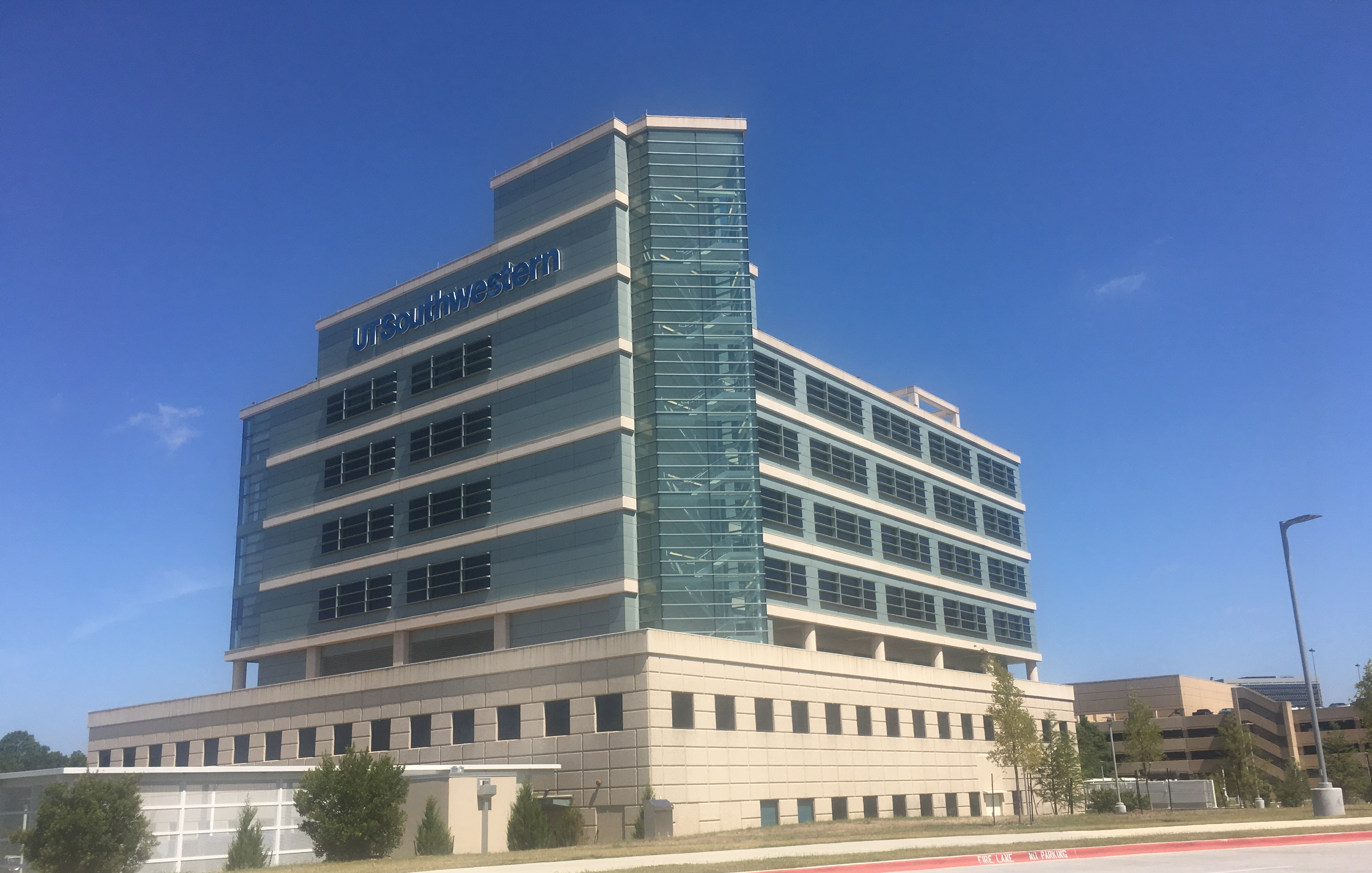
Outpatient building, West campus, UT Southwestern

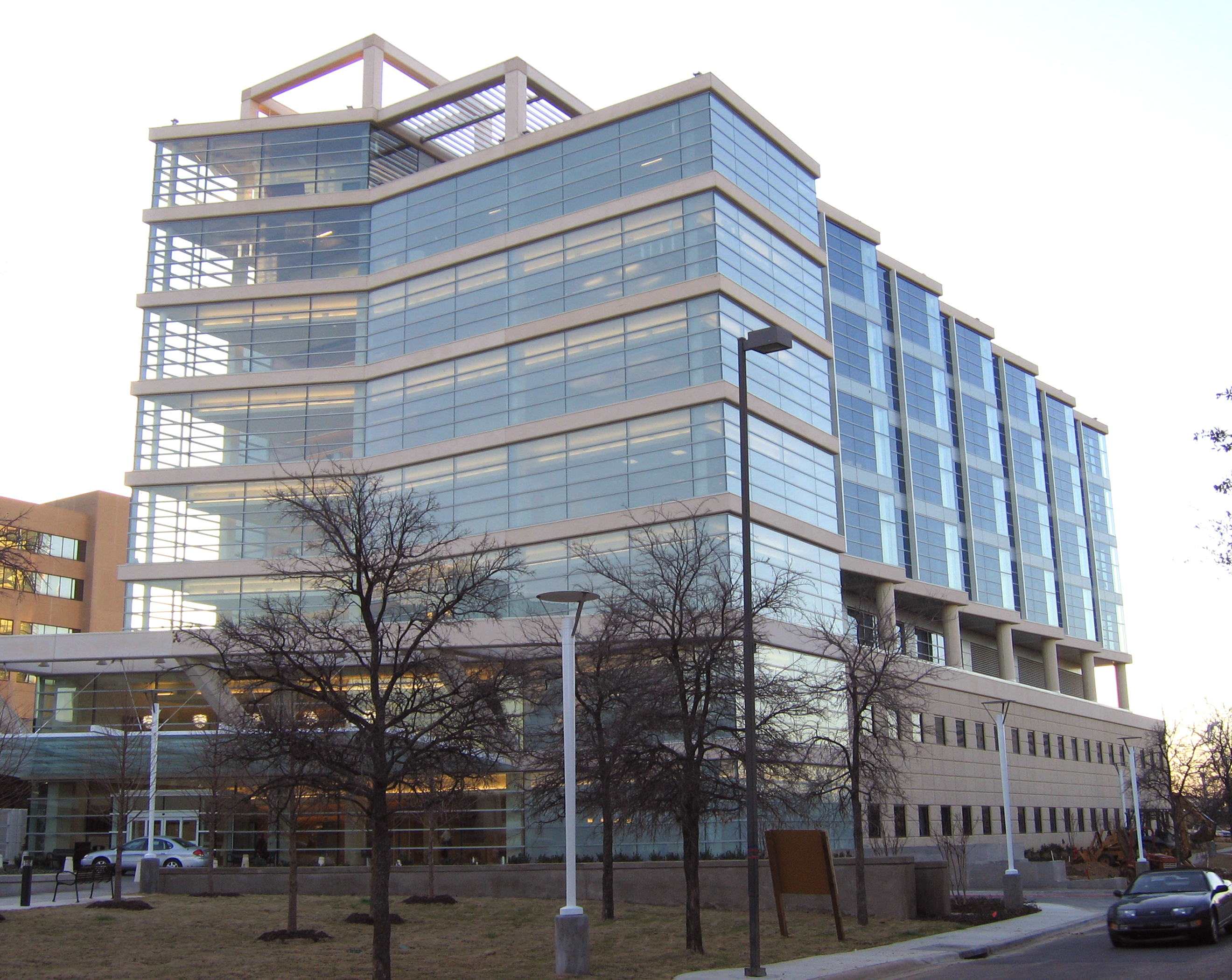
UTSW Outpatient Facility by Lee/Timchula Architects

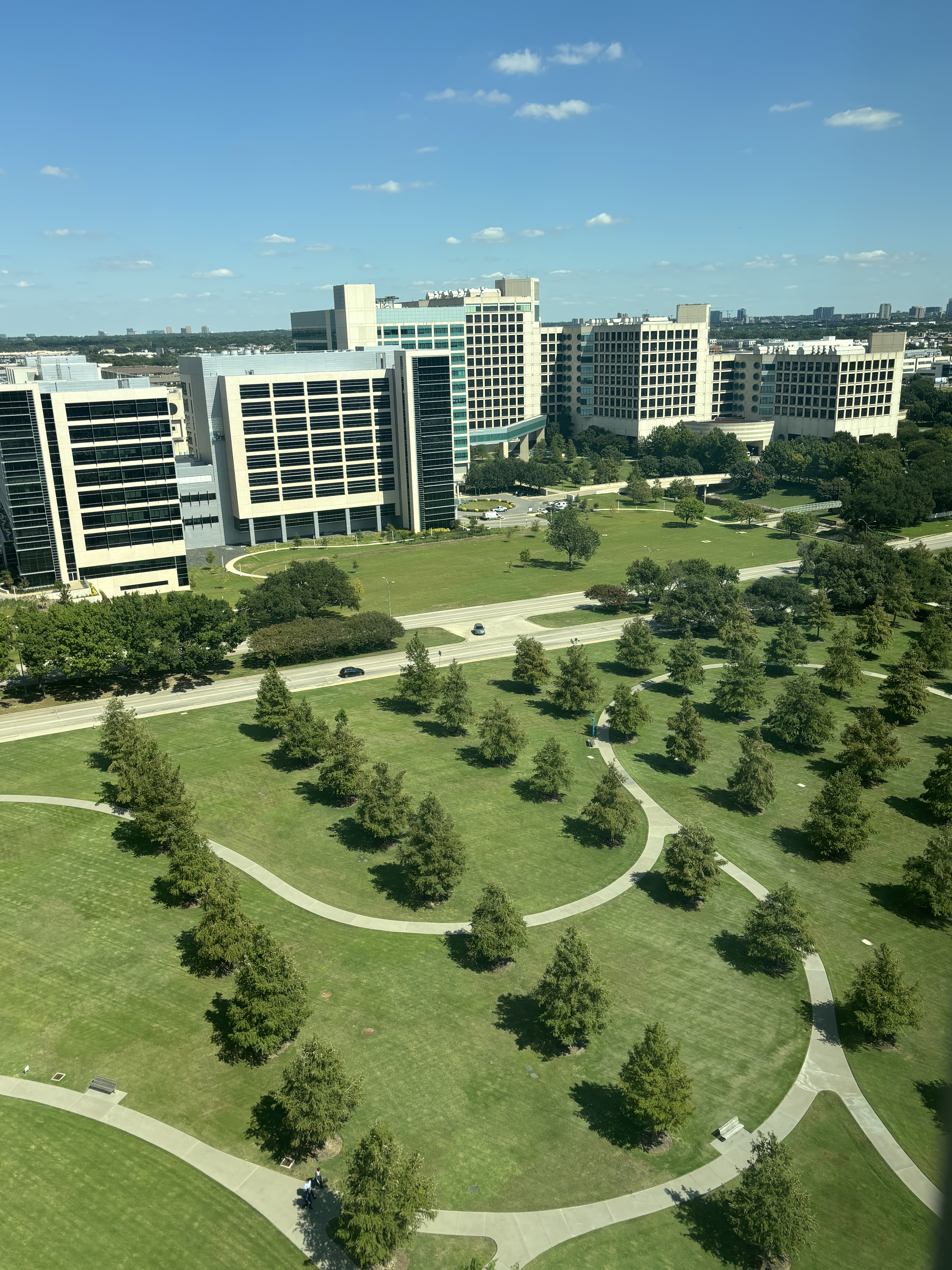
North campus buildings where imaging services and Simmons Cancer Center is located.

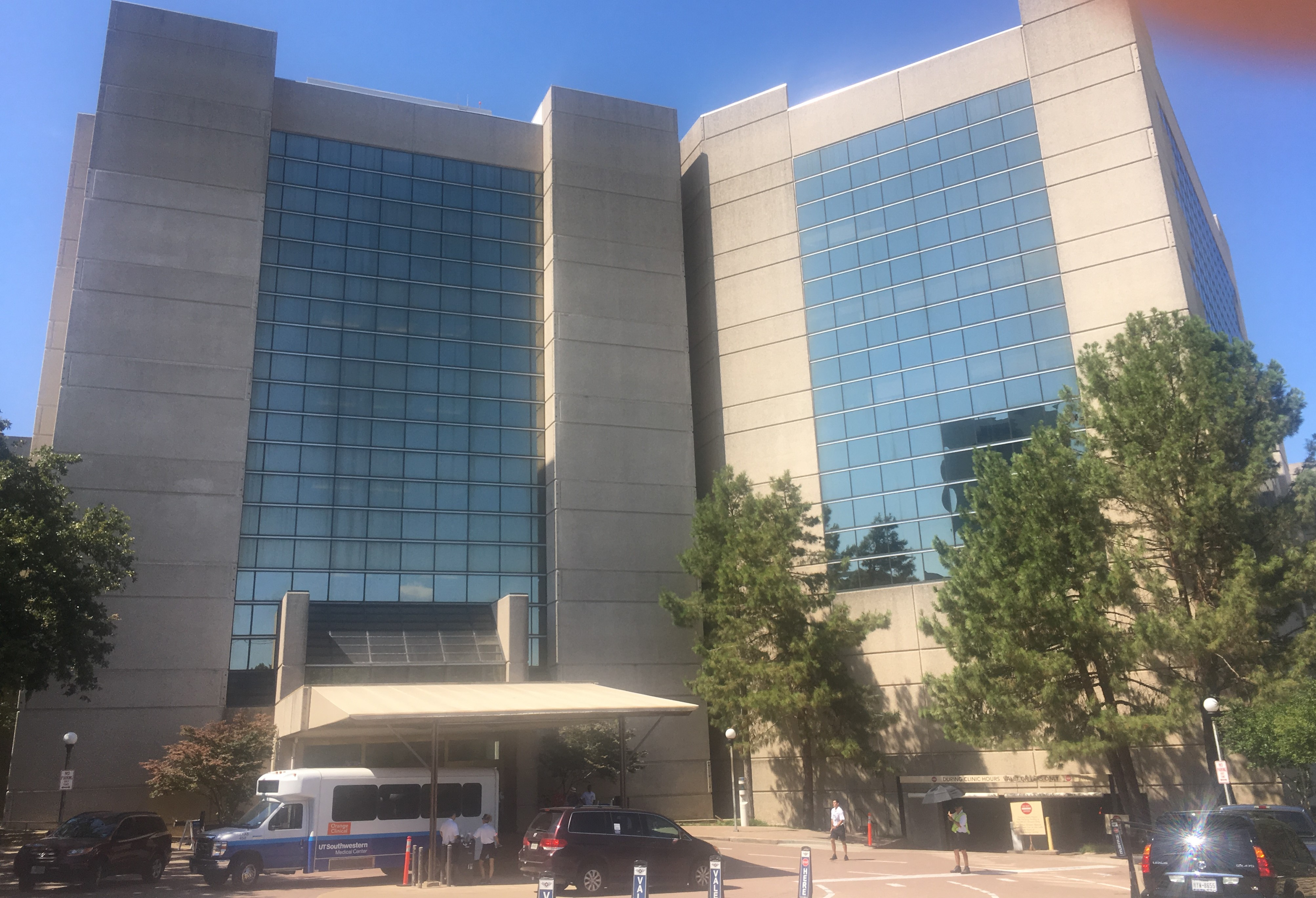
POB-1 Outpatient building

Annual patient visits to the Medical Center's clinics average 400,000 a year, up from 50,000 annually 15 years ago. This includes affiliated patient care facilities such as the UT Southwestern University Hospitals.

The Harold C. Simmons Comprehensive Cancer Center is a National Cancer Institute (NCI)-designated Cancer Center.

UT Southwestern is an Advanced Comprehensive Stroke Center, the highest level of certification. It is the only Joint Commission-certified Advanced Comprehensive Stroke Center in North Texas, one of only three in Texas.

UT Southwestern is home to an NIH Alzheimer's Disease Center and is a Network of Excellence in Neuroscience Clinical Trials Center.

The Doris and Harry W. Bass Jr. Clinical Center for Heart, Lung, and Vascular Disease is a collaborative effort between UT Southwestern faculty and community physicians.

The center's transplantation programs for heart, lung, kidney, and liver have been certified by the federal government's Centers for Medicare & Medicaid Services.

== Academics ==
Campus Landmarks
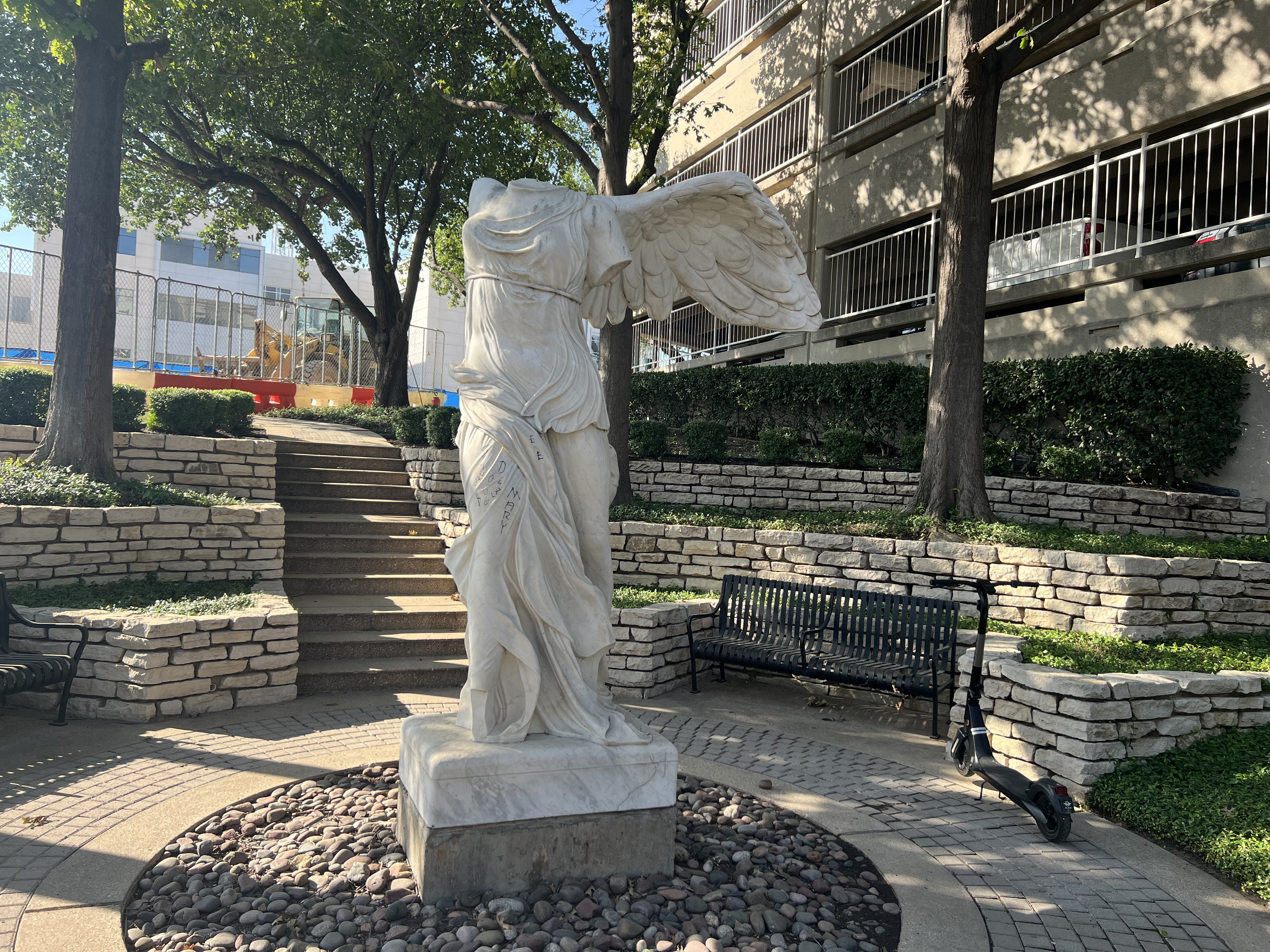
Replica of Nike of Samothrace, located south of the Children's Hospital

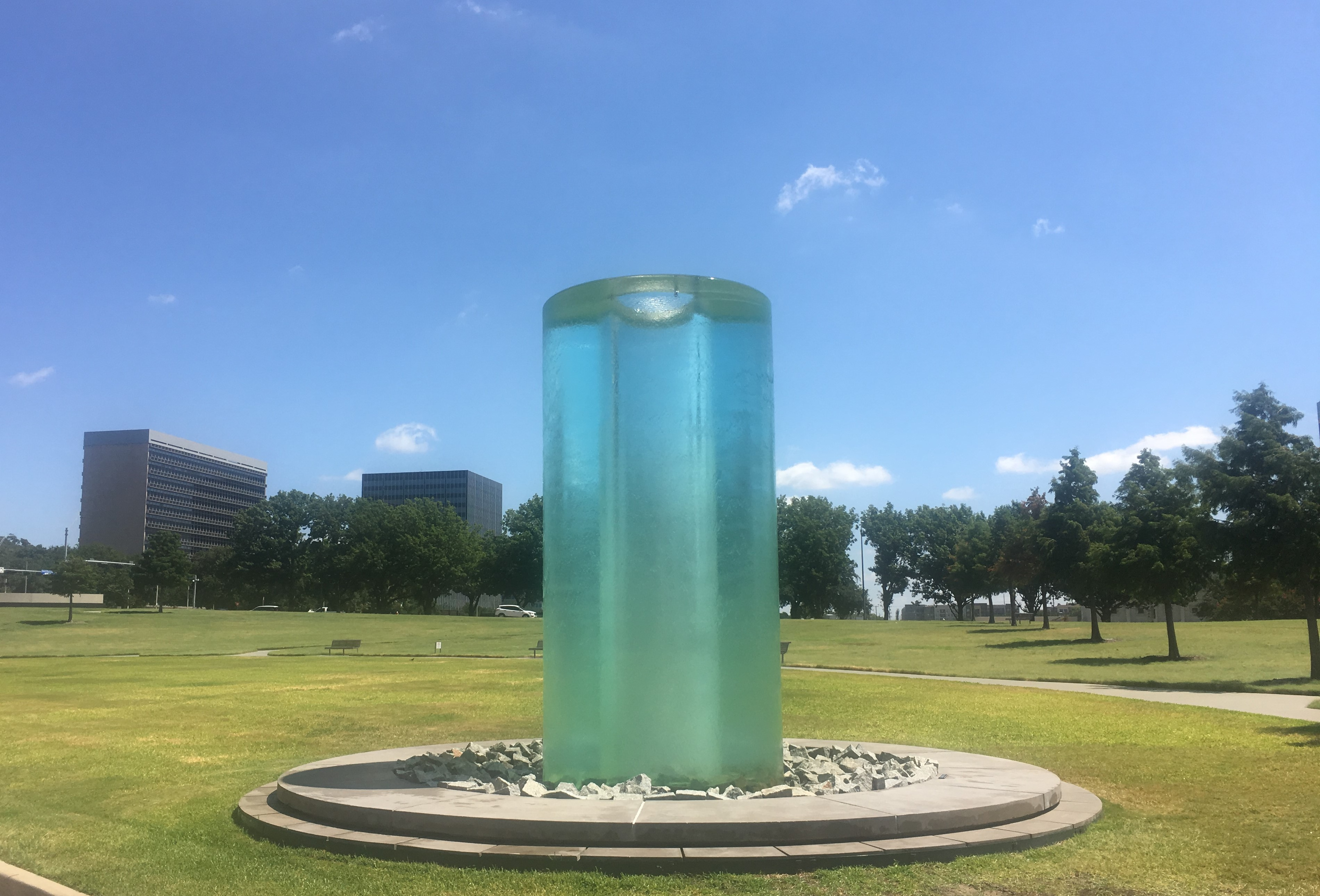
Water fountain in front of the William P. Clements Jr. University Hospital

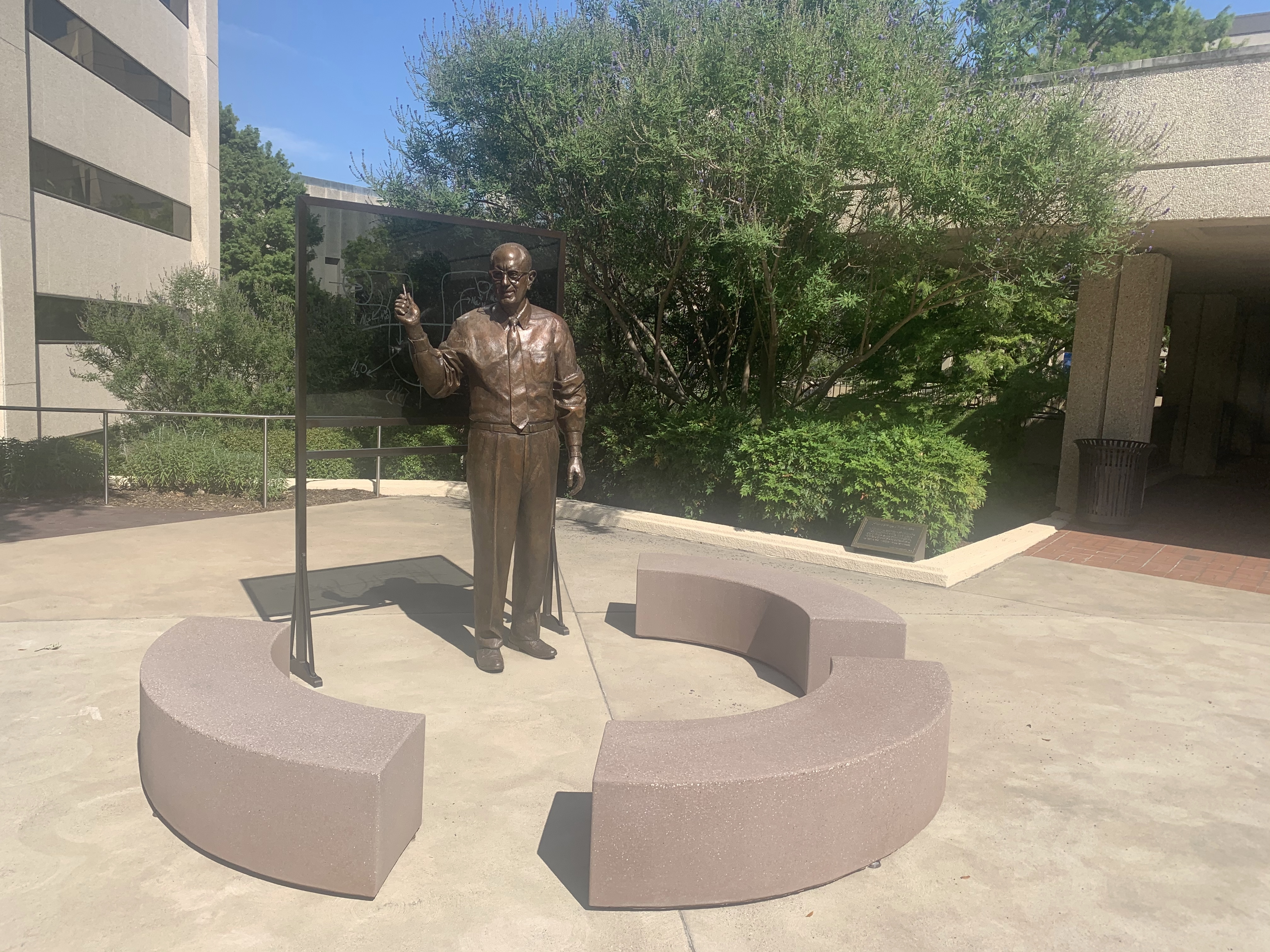
Seven foot-tall bronze figure of Donald Wayne Seldin, M.D

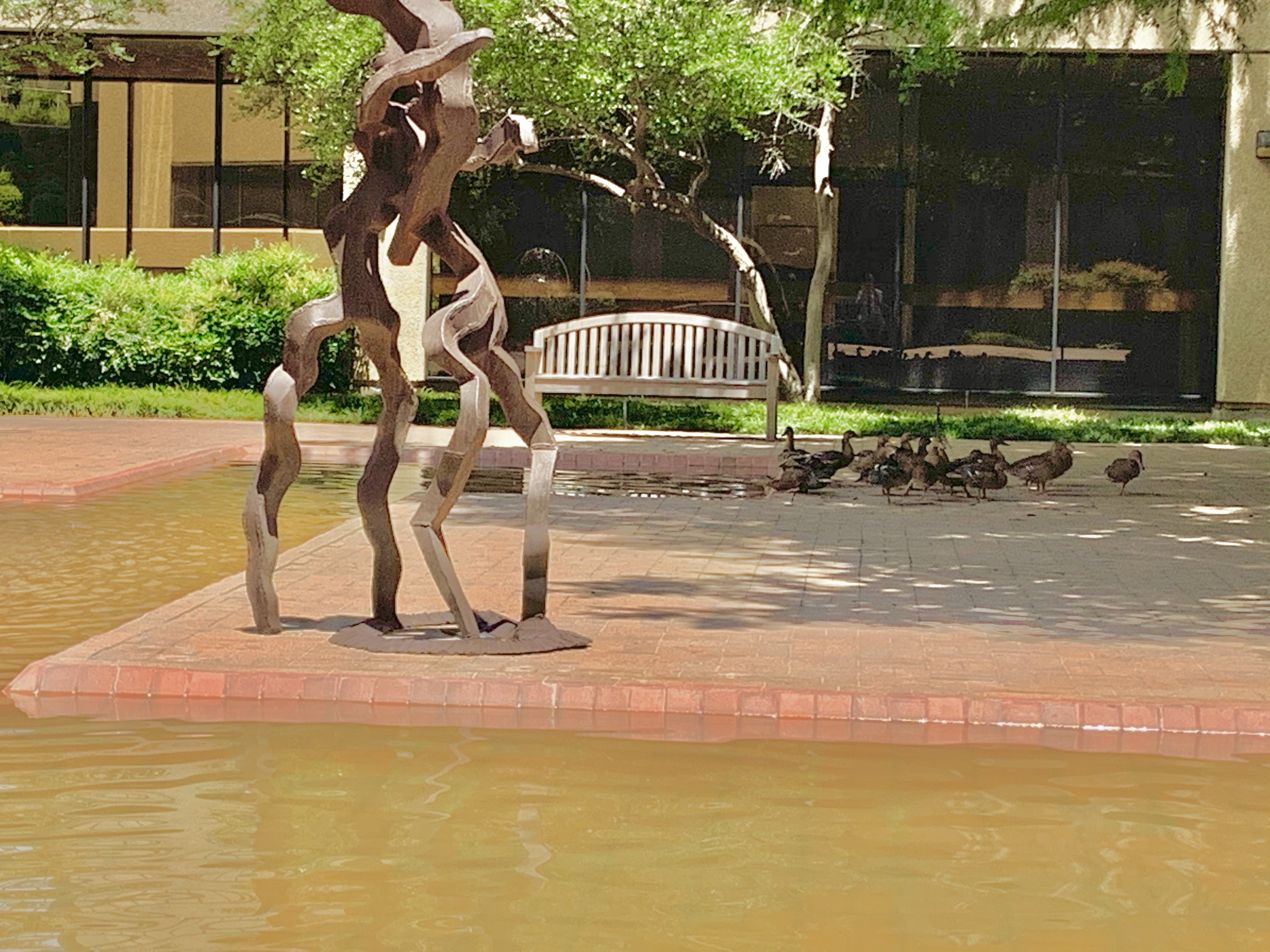
Sunken garden in south campus

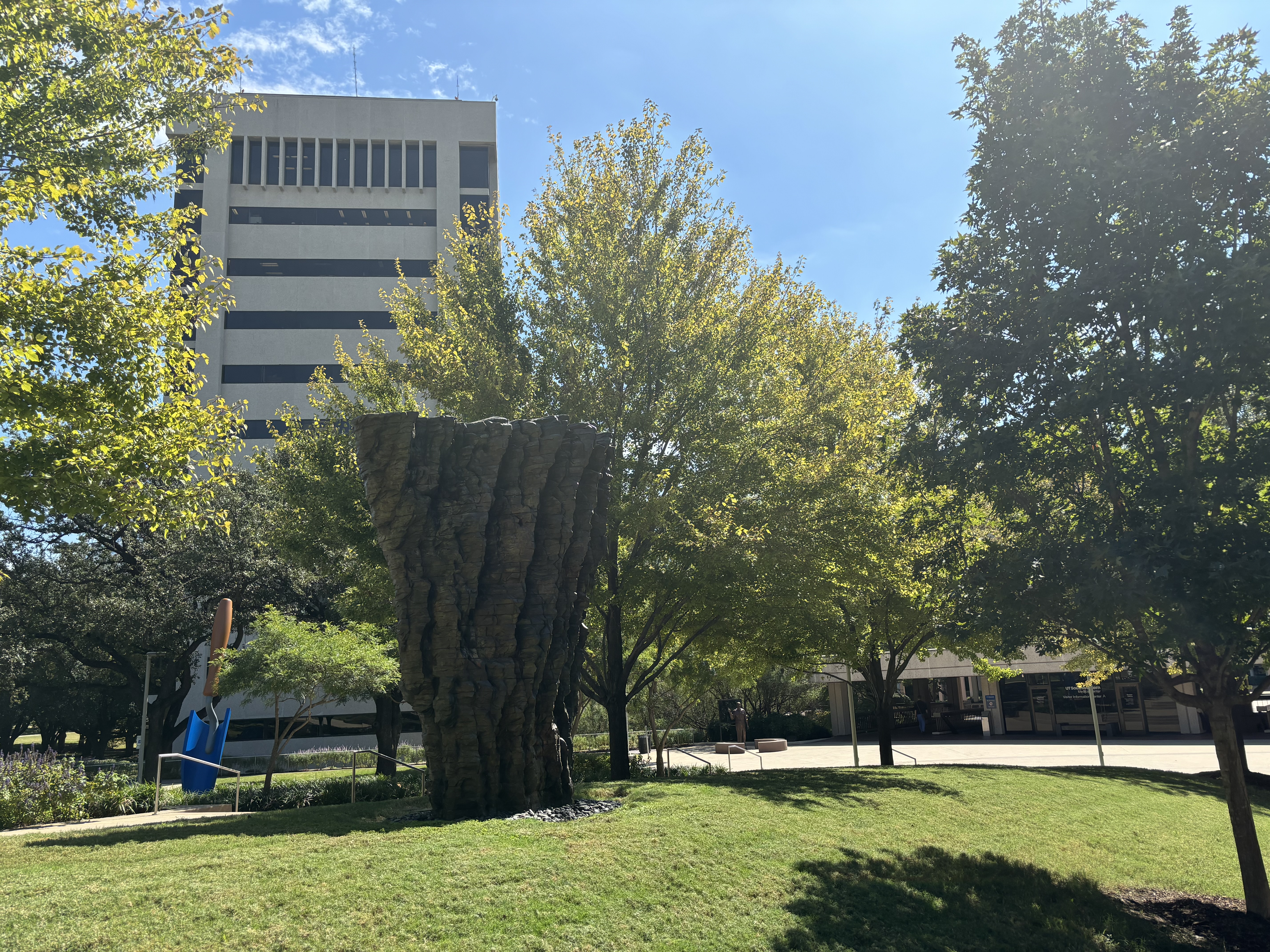
Artwork by Ursula von Rydingsvard

UT Southwestern is governed by the UT System Board of Regents. The Medical Center includes four degree-granting institutions/schools: UT Southwestern Medical School, UT Southwestern Graduate School of Biomedical Sciences, UT Southwestern School of Health Professions, and UT Southwestern Peter O'Donnell Jr. School of Public Health. Throughout its history, UT Southwestern has graduated approximately 22,420 physicians and other professionals in all areas of medicine. In 2022 alone, UTSW faculty is training about 3,800 medical, graduate, and health professions students, residents, and postdoctoral fellows.

=== UT Southwestern Medical School ===
Student body composition as of May 2, 2022
| Race and ethnicity | Total |
|---|---|
| Non-Hispanic White/Non-Latin White | 36% |
| Asian | 26% |
| Hispanic and Latin (of any race) | 17% |
| Foreign national | 8% |
| Black | 4% |
| Other (Note: Other consists of Multiracial Americans & those who prefer to not say.) | 4% |

UT Southwestern admits approximately 230 students each year. The average MCAT score is 518, and undergraduate GPA in 2023 was 3.93. The acceptance rate for 2014 was 5.6%.

UTSW is one of the five least-expensive public medical schools and among the top 10 largest medical schools in the United States. The school's tuition and fees are approximately $23,200 per year for in-state residents, being subsidized by the state of Texas. Admission is competitive and, by mandate of the state legislature, 90% of applicants admitted are from the state of Texas. Many out-of-state students earn competitive scholarships that make up the difference.

The Medical School's curriculum emphasizes clinical experience and electives from the first year on. The curriculum comprises three periods:

- Pre-Clerkship
- Clerkship
- Post-Clerkship

The UTSW curriculum focuses on providing a foundation in biomedical sciences, training in clinical care, and opportunities for research. The Medical School features six Academic Colleges that function as small learning communities, each headed by a faculty mentor.

Along with the M.D. degree, UT Southwestern offers options for students to pursue combined degrees and to earn special graduation distinctions. The combined degrees include:

- M.D./Ph.D. (Called the Medical Scientist Training Program (MSTP), this is one of fewer than 50 M.D./Ph.D. granting programs nationwide that receive financial support from the National Institutes of Health. It combines dissertation work in an area of biomedical science, leading to the Ph.D., along with clinical studies, leading to the M.D.)
- M.D./M.B.A. (This five-year program in conjunction with UT Dallas focuses on giving future physicians the skills for integrating medicine and business)
- M.D./M.P.H. (UT Southwestern and UTHealth School of Public Health in Houston offer students a university degree in each field at the end of their four-year M.D. program)
- M.D./M.S. (In Clinical Science. This program combines didactic training with a mentored clinical research project. The program concludes with submission and defense of a master's thesis)

=== Graduate School of Biomedical Sciences ===
Faculty body composition as of May 2, 2022
| Race and ethnicity | Total |
|---|---|
| White (Including White Hispanic and White Latin) | 57% |
| Asian | 24% |
| Black | 17% |
| Others | 1% |

With an enrollment of more than 1,000 students (549 predoctoral and 484 postdoctoral), the Graduate School educates biomedical scientists, engineers, clinical researchers, and counselors. Programs lead to Doctor of Philosophy (Ph.D.) and Master of Science (M.S.) degrees and, in some cases, non-degree certificates.

The Graduate School has 12 Ph.D. programs: Biological Chemistry; Biomedical Engineering; Cancer Biology; Cell and Molecular Biology; Clinical Psychology; Genetics, Development, and Disease; Immunology; Integrative Biology; Molecular Biophysics; Molecular Microbiology; Neuroscience; and Organic Chemistry.

In addition, a Master's Degree and a certificate are offered in Clinical Science. Postdoctoral certificates are offered in Research, Advanced Research, Cancer, Educational Techniques, Obesity and Metabolism, and Scientific Management.

UT Southwestern runs a Medical Scientist Training Program (MSTP) offering a combined M.D./Ph.D. degree. It is one of only 54 M.D./Ph.D. granting programs nationwide that receive financial support from the National Institutes of Health. The largest source of private support for UTSW's program has been from H. Ross Perot.^{[10]}

The clinical training curriculum includes coursework in the disciplines necessary to understand human disease at the level of cellular physiology and biochemistry. In addition, students practice clinical skills at UT Southwestern's affiliated clinical training hospitals, including Parkland Memorial Hospital and William P. Clements Jr. University Hospital.

Following summer laboratory rotations, students choose one of 10 interdepartmental graduate programs and select a dissertation mentor from the UT Southwestern Graduate School faculty for training in intellectual and experimental strategies. During these years, the MSTP student functions as a graduate student in his or her laboratory while maintaining an awareness of clinical medicine through program activities.

Dissertation research culminates in results that significantly advance the state of biomedical knowledge.

=== School of Health Professions ===
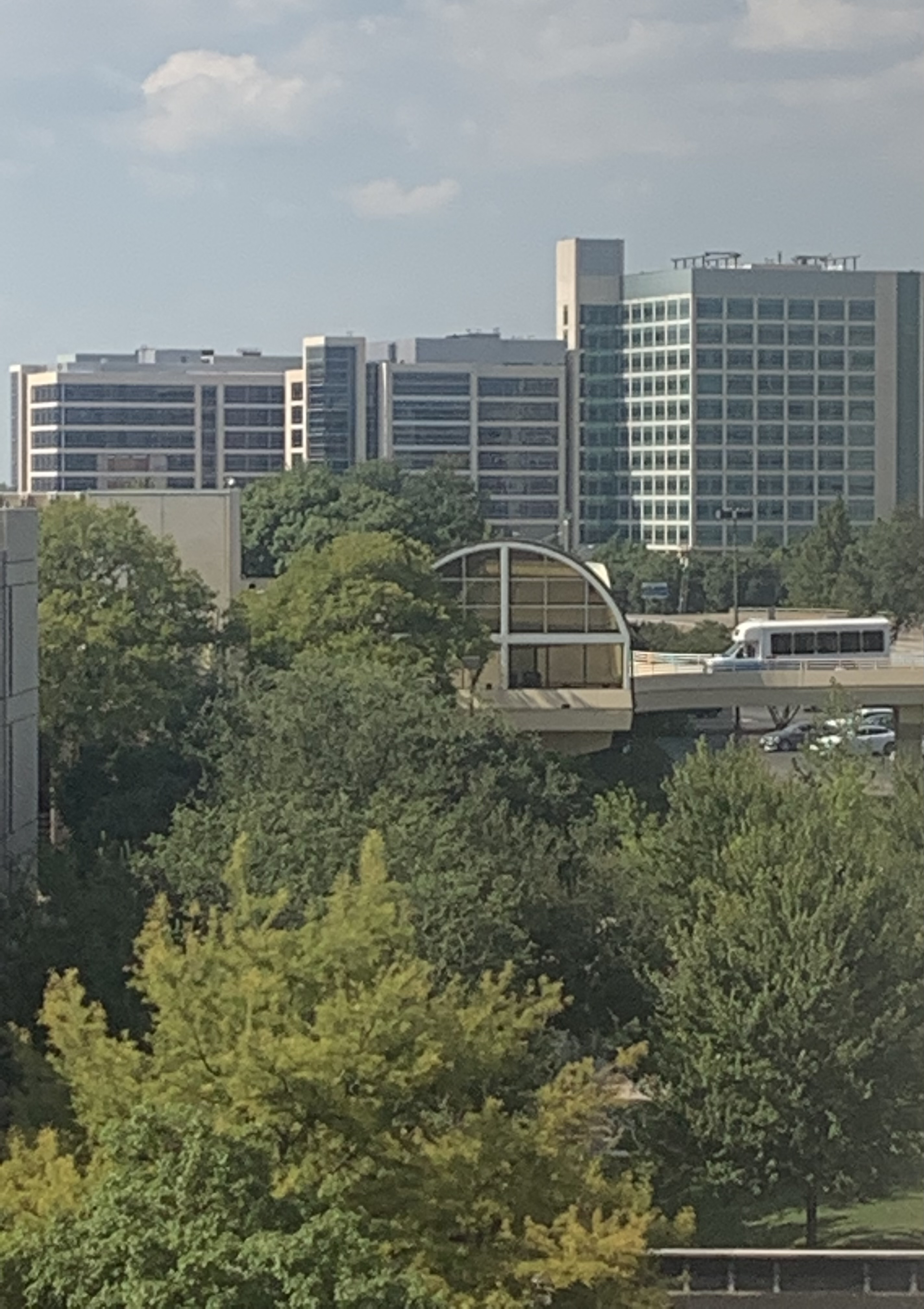
UT Southwestern Medical Center main campus looking north

About 340 students are enrolled in UT Southwestern's School of Health Professions. The school confers a doctoral professional degree in Physical Therapy and master's degrees in Clinical Nutrition, Physician Assistant Studies, Prosthetics-Orthotics, and Rehabilitation Counseling. The school also has a baccalaureate certificate program in Radiation Therapy.

The Physician Assistant program was founded in 1972. For the past five years, graduates have had a 100% first-time pass rate on the national certifying exam. Much of the training occurs at Parkland Hospital.^{[11]}

=== Peter O'Donnell Jr. School of Public Health ===
The Peter O'Donnell Jr. School of Public Health is UT Southwestern's newest school. The school was established in 2022.

== Rankings ==
UTSW Rankings Worldwide
| Type | Year | Ranking | Reference |
|---|---|---|---|
| Academic Ranking of World Universities (ARWU) | | | |
| Overall (global) | 2025 | 58 | |
| Biological Sciences (global) | 2025 | 19 | |
| Clinical Medicine (global) | 2025 | 51-75 | |
| Human Biological Sciences (global) | 2025 | 19 | |
| Medical Technology (global) | 2025 | 20 | |
| U.S. News & World Report (USNWR) | | | |
| Medicine: Primary Care (national) | 2024 | Tier 2 | |
| Medicine: Research (national) | 2025 | Tier 1 | |
| Physician Assistant (national) | 2025 | 8 | |
| Biological Sciences (national) | 2025 | 25 | |
| Molecular Biology & Genetics (global) | 2025 | 36 | |
| Cardiac and Cardiovascular Systems (global) | 2025 | 28 | |
| Cell biology (global) | 2025 | 21 | |
| Endocrinology and Metabolism (global) | 2025 | 2 | |
| Biology and Biochemistry (global) | 2025 | 30 | |
| Clinical Medicine (global) | 2025 | 43 | |
| Gastroenterology and Hepatology (global) | 2025 | 29 | |
| Surgery (global) | 2025 | 48 | |
| Overall (global) | 2025 | 103 | |
| Center for World University Rankings | | | |
| Overall (global) | 2025 | 67 | |
| Urology and Nephrology (global) | 2018 | 5 | |
| QS World University Rankings | | | |
| Anatomy & Physiology (global) | 2025 | 46 | |
| Medicine (global) | 2025 | 110 | |
| Life Sciences (global) | 2025 | 126 | |
| Biological Sciences (global) | 2025 | 112 | |
| CWTS Leiden Ranking | | | |
| Biomedical and Health Sciences (global) | 2024 | 91 | |
| Nature Index | | | |
| Healthcare Institutions (global) | 2025 | 4 | |
| NIH | | | |
| NIH Funding (national) | 2024 | 24 | |

== Library ==
The Health Sciences Digital Library and Learning Center supports the information needs of UT Southwestern's research, educational, and clinical activities. The Library and Learning Center maintains a large collection of electronic information resources, print archives, rare books, and materials concerning the history of medicine. It also offers assistance and training in using these resources. The library also has a small branch on the North Campus.^{[12]}

== Research ==
Campus research facilities
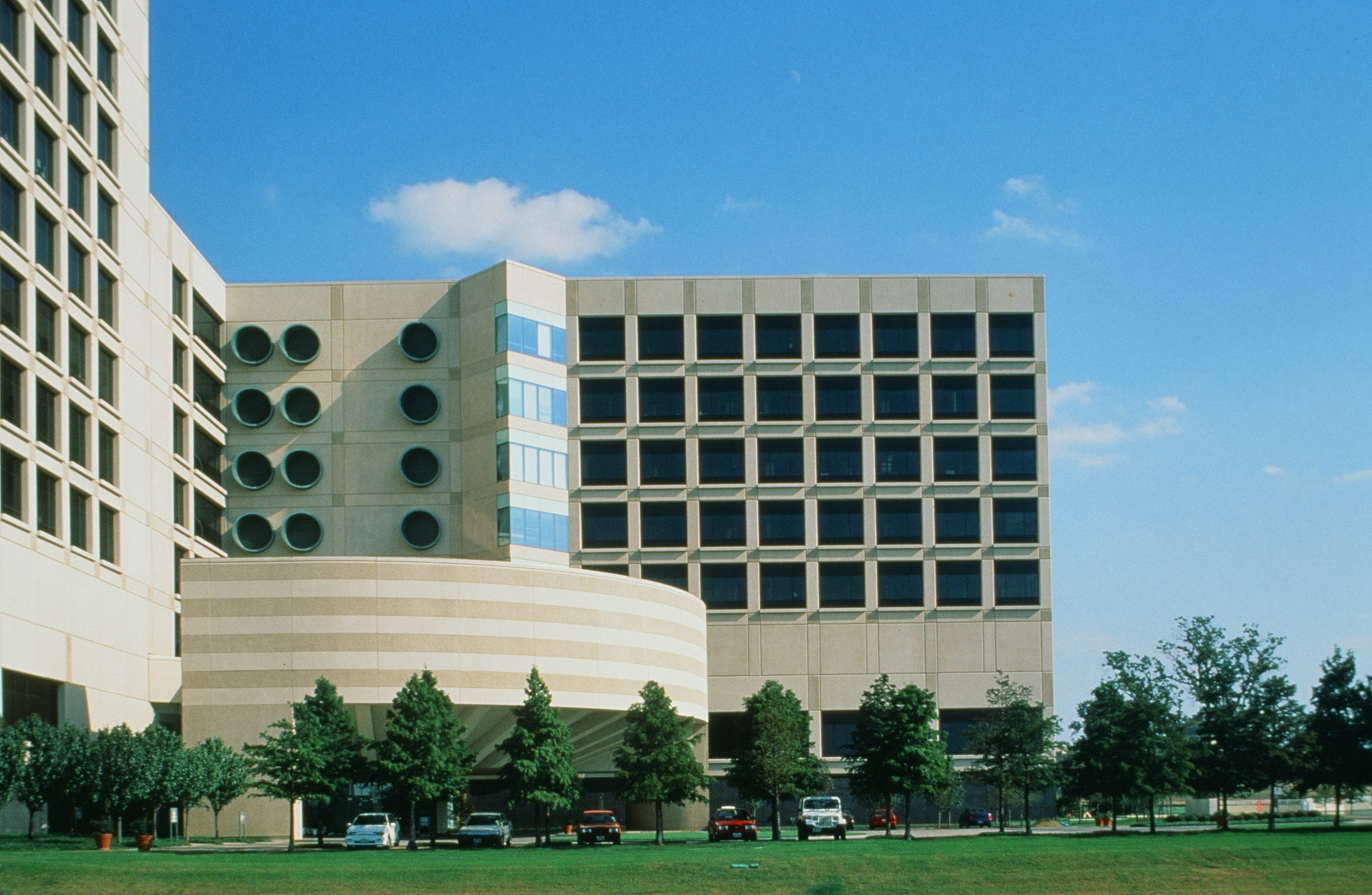
Original phases 1, 2 of research buildings in 1993. Designed by Edward Larrabee Barnes and John M.Y. Lee Architects

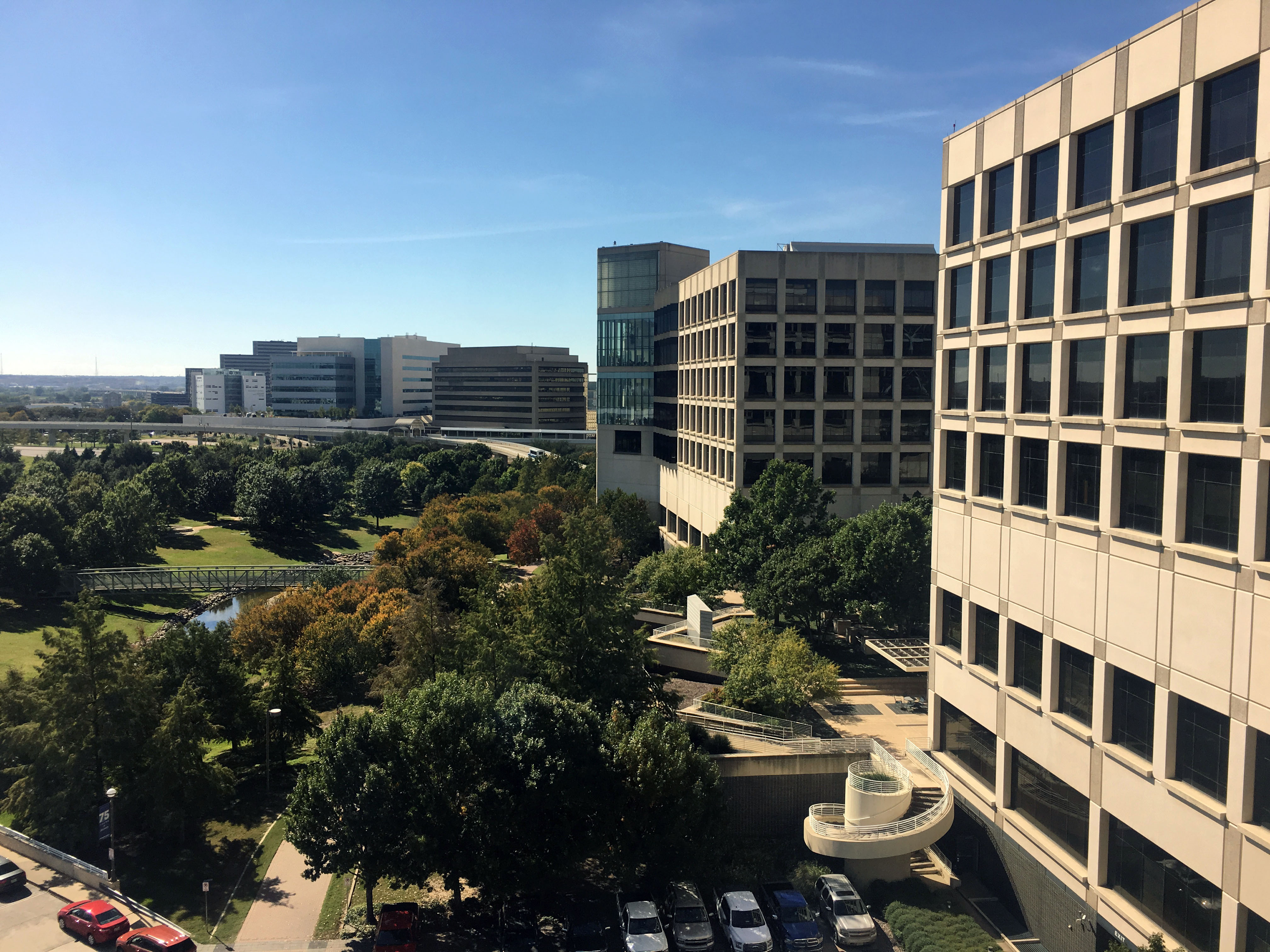
The northern and western campuses are where most of the more recent research infrastructure is located.

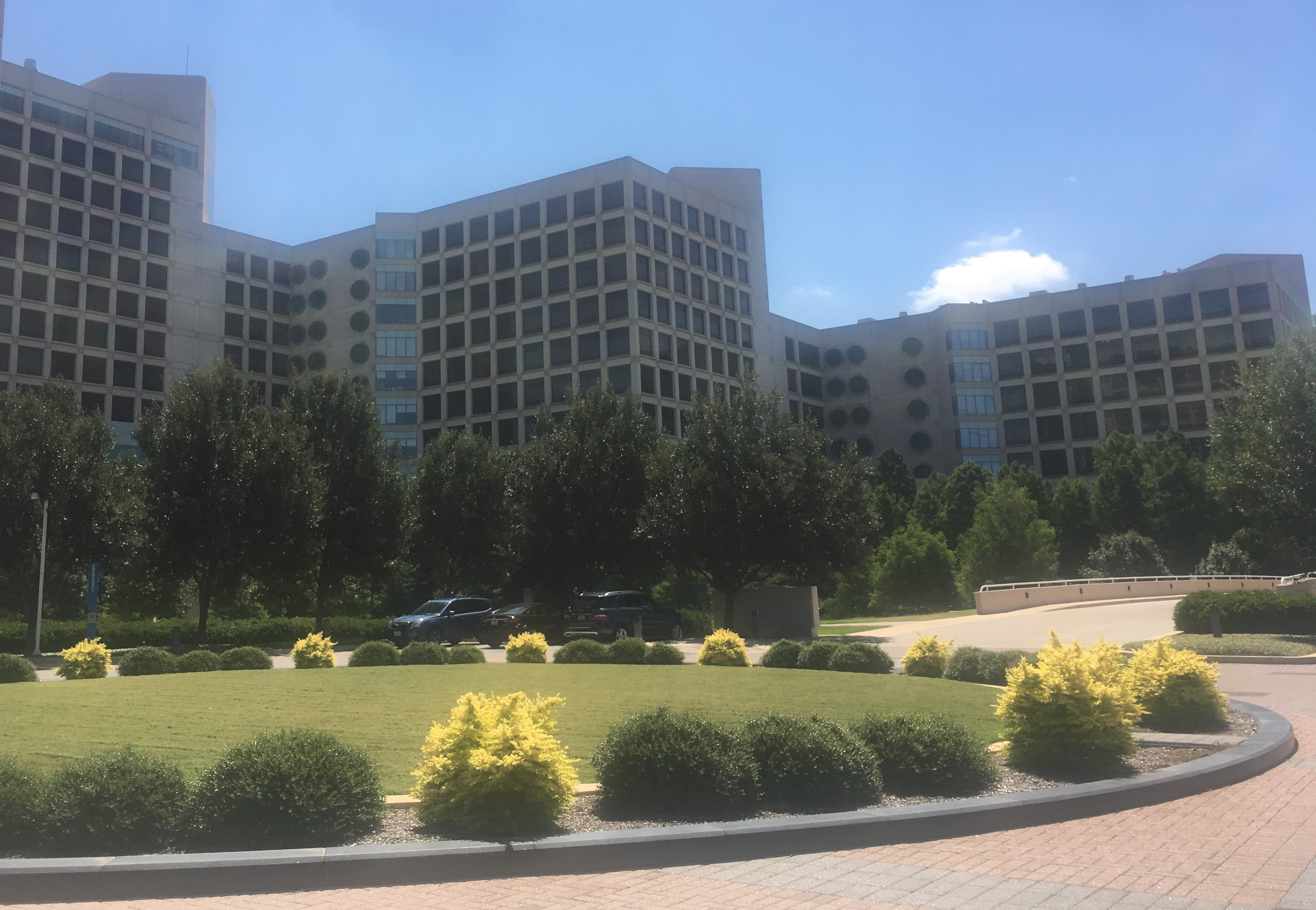
T. Boone Pickens Biomedical Research Center

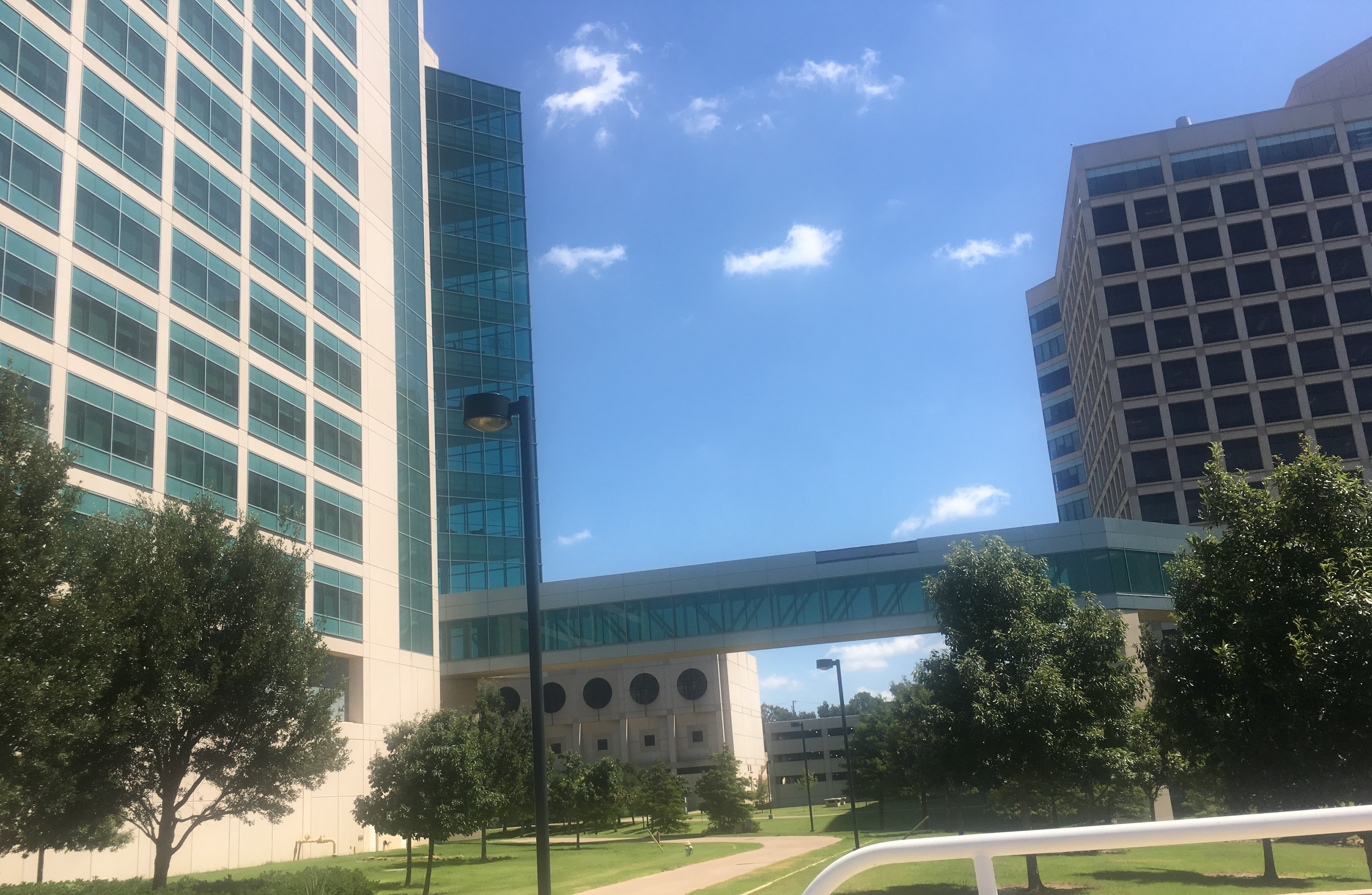
The research buildings adjacent to the Simmons Cancer Center

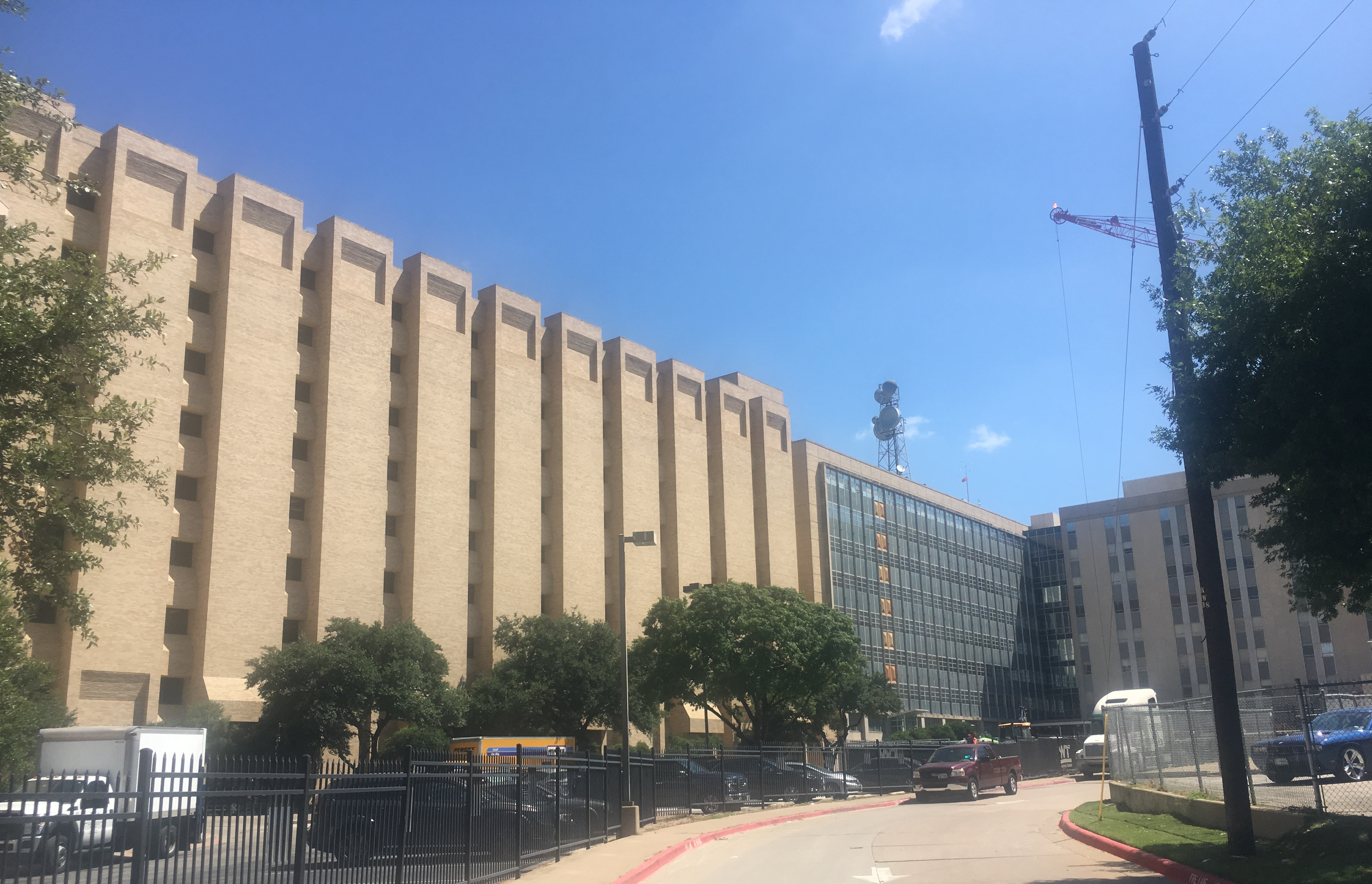
The Moss building is the largest addition for research in the south part of campus.

UT Southwestern had a total research expenditure of $634.9 million in 2022. UT Southwestern scientists and physician researchers conduct investigations into cancer, stem cells, neuroscience, heart disease and stroke, arthritis, diabetes, and many other fields.

At the Peter O’Donnell Jr. Brain Institute on campus, investigators research the basic molecular workings of the brain, and their application to the prevention and treatment of brain diseases and injuries. The Institute covers neurodegenerative diseases; depression and psychiatric disorders; migraines; and spine, nerve, and muscle diseases. Also at the Institute are voice specialists, rehabilitation experts, and neuroimmunologists, plus basic and translational scientists in cellular and molecular neuroscience, neurobiology, regenerative medicine, neuro-engineering, imaging, and genetics.

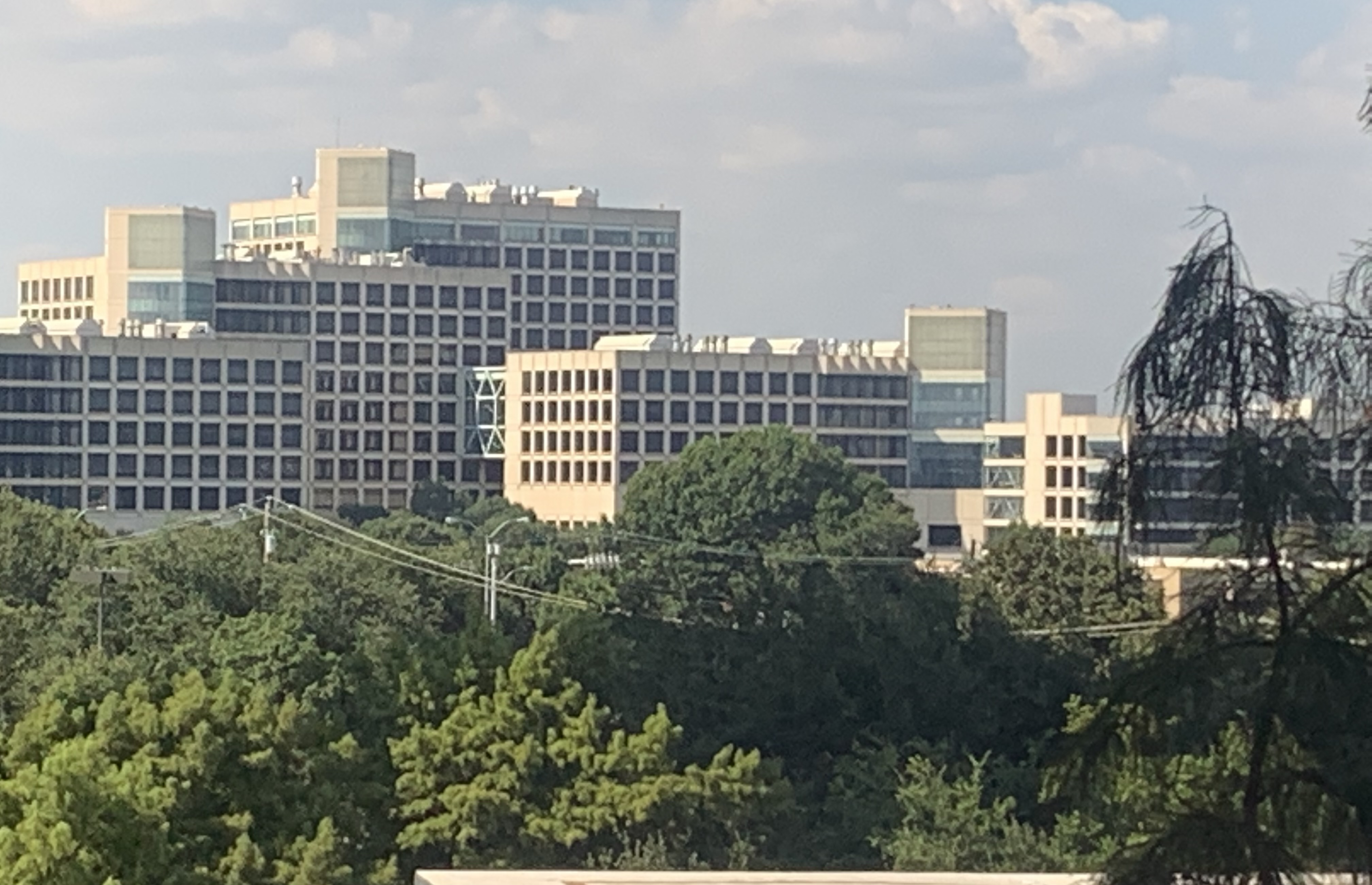
Underneath the North campus buildings is a 17MeV Cyclotron facility, exclusively used for research.

Researchers at UTSW's Harold C. Simmons Comprehensive Cancer Center, the only cancer center in North Texas with the National Cancer Institute's "comprehensive" designation, are focusing on discovering drug-like chemicals that drive or inhibit cancer growth, and deciphering mechanisms in cell regulatory networks that go awry and contribute to cancer initiation and growth. Researchers in developmental biology, cancer biology, and stem cell biology work on how developmental processes contribute to cancer's progress.

In 2011, the Children's Medical Center Research Institute at UT Southwestern (CRI) was established as a joint venture between Children's Health System of Texas and UTSW. Located on the UTSW campus, CRI is home to an interdisciplinary group of scientists and physicians pursuing research in regenerative medicine, cancer biology and metabolism.

UT Southwestern established the Hamon Center for Regenerative Science and Medicine in 2014 for research on fundamental mechanisms of tissue formation and repair, and to develop transformative strategies and medications for tissue regeneration.

Research at UTSW's Texas Institute for Brain Injury and Repair focuses on brain injuries and conditions, including traumatic brain injury (TBI), stroke, and Alzheimer's disease. The institute also promotes brain injury education and prevention.

Other research currently underway at UT Southwestern includes studies on:

- Aging and Alzheimer's (Steven McKnight and colleagues identified a compound (P7C3) and demonstrated that it preserves newly created brain cells and boosts learning and memory. The study has led to further investigations into the mechanism by which P7C3 protects cells from dying and whether the compound might have any protective effect for various neurodegenerative diseases).
- Cancer/Biomarkers (John Minna and Adi Gazdar have spent the past 30 years elucidating the genetic changes associated with the development of lung cancer. Their work seeks to discover these changes and use them as biomarkers both to detect lung cancer earlier and to develop new therapies. Their approach is advancing personalized medicine, which aims to target the unique characteristics of an individual's tumor with the best current therapies).
- Cancer/Stem Cells (A team led by Sean J. Morrison at CRI has identified the environment in which blood-forming stem cells survive and thrive within the body, an important step toward increasing the safety and effectiveness of bone marrow transplantation).
- Cardiology/Regeneration (Researchers, including Eric Olson and Hesham Sadek, have pinpointed a molecular mechanism needed to unleash the heart's ability to regenerate. They found that microRNAs, tiny strands that regulate gene expression, contribute to the heart's ability to regenerate up to one week after birth. Soon thereafter the heart loses the ability to regenerate. Identifying the heart's natural regenerative on-off switch is a critical step toward developing eventual therapies for damage suffered following a heart attack. Olson's lab has also used CRISPR/Cas9 methods to cure Duchenne muscular dystrophy in mice as a proof of principle for human gene therapy).
- Cholesterol (UT Southwestern researchers have identified nearly 30 disease-causing genes, including in 1983 the gene responsible for familial hypercholesterolemia, an inherited condition that causes extremely high levels of cholesterol and heart attacks at an early age. That discovery by Michael Brown and Joseph Goldstein contributed to the pair winning the 1985 Nobel Prize in Physiology or Medicine for their research uncovering the underlying mechanisms of cholesterol metabolism).
- Diabetes/Obesity (Philipp Scherer's discovery of adiponectin, a hormone produced by fat, has helped transform the scientific concept of fat as an inert storage depot to that of an endocrine “organ” that exerts control over multiple organs. His studies have revealed adiponectin's potent anti-diabetes effects of blocking glucose production in the liver and improving insulin sensitivity in muscle. Because adiponectin levels fall as fat levels rise, drugs that increase adiponectin may be effective in fighting diabetes and other obesity-related diseases).
- Human Genetics (Helen Hobbs and Jonathan Cohen are among the world's leading experts on the genetic factors associated with lipid disorders. Their work, for which Hobbs received the 2016 Breakthrough Prize in Life Sciences, has led to the development of a new class of cholesterol-lowering drugs, PCSK9 antibodies, for patients who do not tolerate or respond adequately to statins).
- Innate Immunity (Scientists led by Zhijian “James” Chen are exploring the mechanisms of signal transduction, namely how a cell communicates with its surroundings and within itself. They are focused on investigating how a cell detects harmful or foreign threats and mounts an appropriate response to restore homeostasis. Chen was elected to the National Academy of Sciences, for work including the cytoplasmic DNA sensor cGAS and its product cGAMP, a novel cyclic dinucleotide second messenger involved in innate immune response. Bruce Beutler received the 2011 Nobel Prize in Physiology or Medicine for his discovery that the Toll-like receptor 4 (TLR4) is the membrane-spanning component of the mammalian lipopolysaccharide receptor complex that senses microbial infection and triggers septic shock. Beutler continues to identify components of the mammalian immune system through large-scale mouse mutagenesis screens conducted in the Center for the Genetics of Host Defense, which he leads).

== Notable people ==
=== Nobel Laureates ===
Nobel Laureates affiliated with UTSW
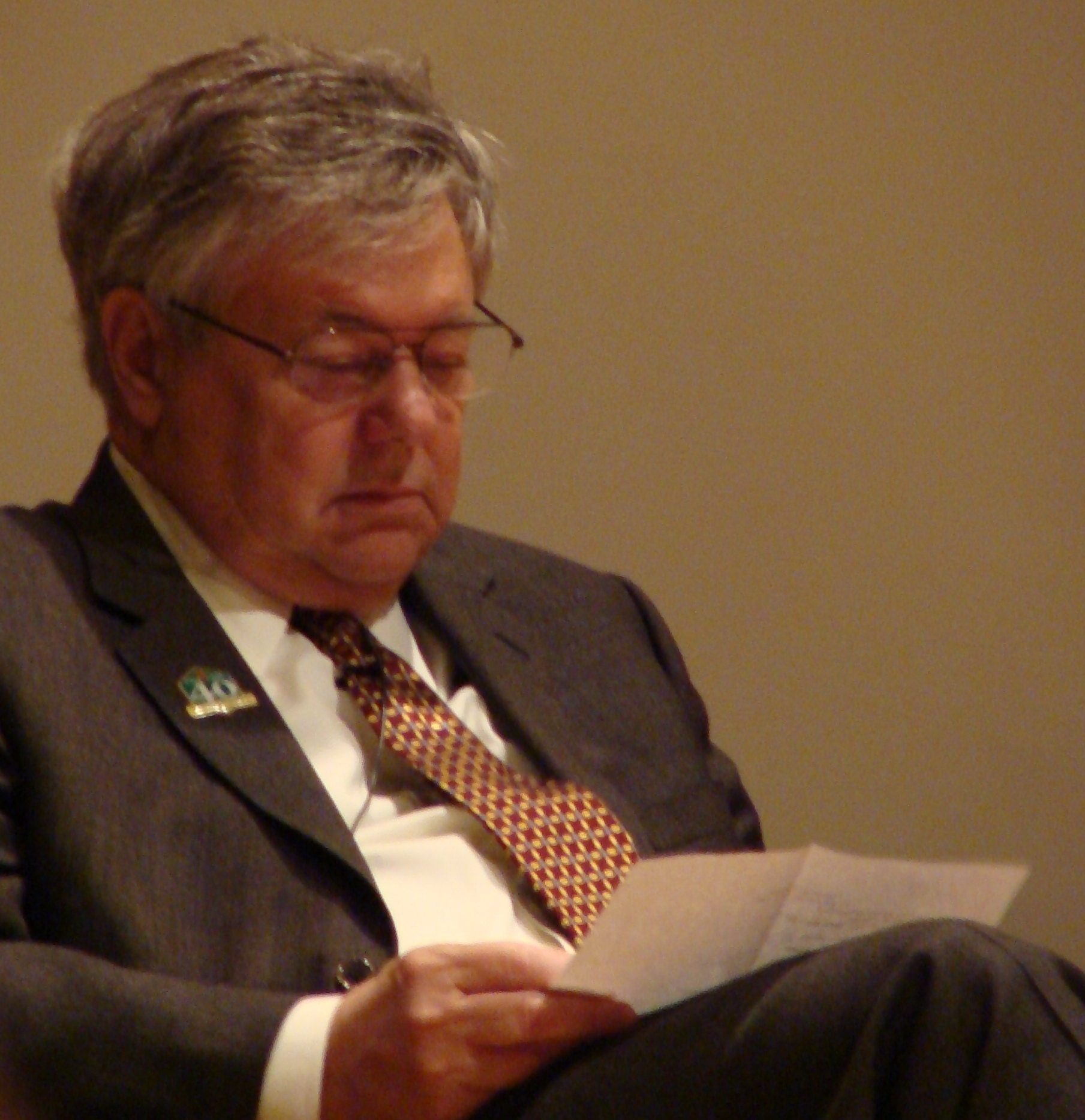
Michael S. Brown

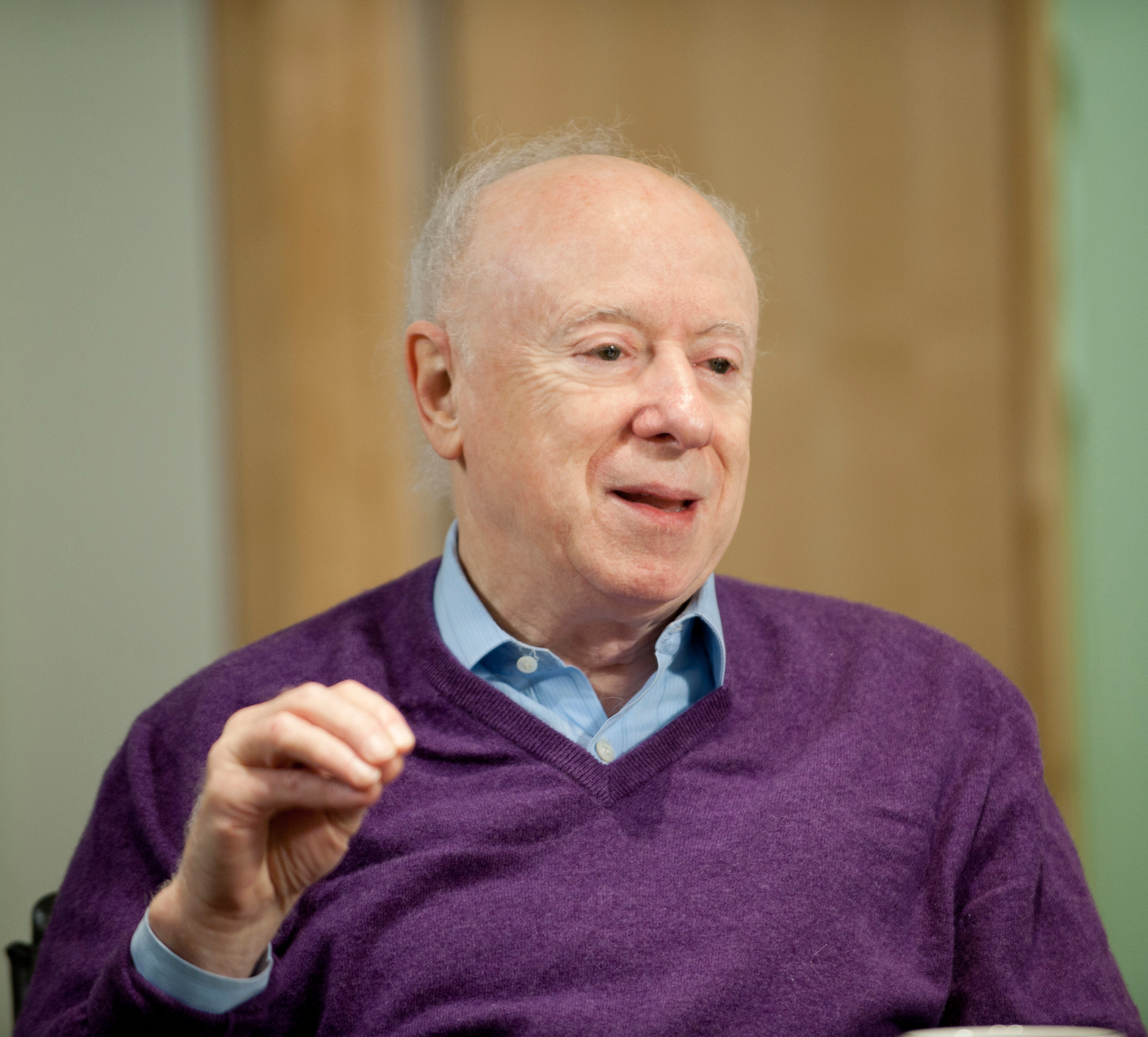
Joseph L. Goldstein

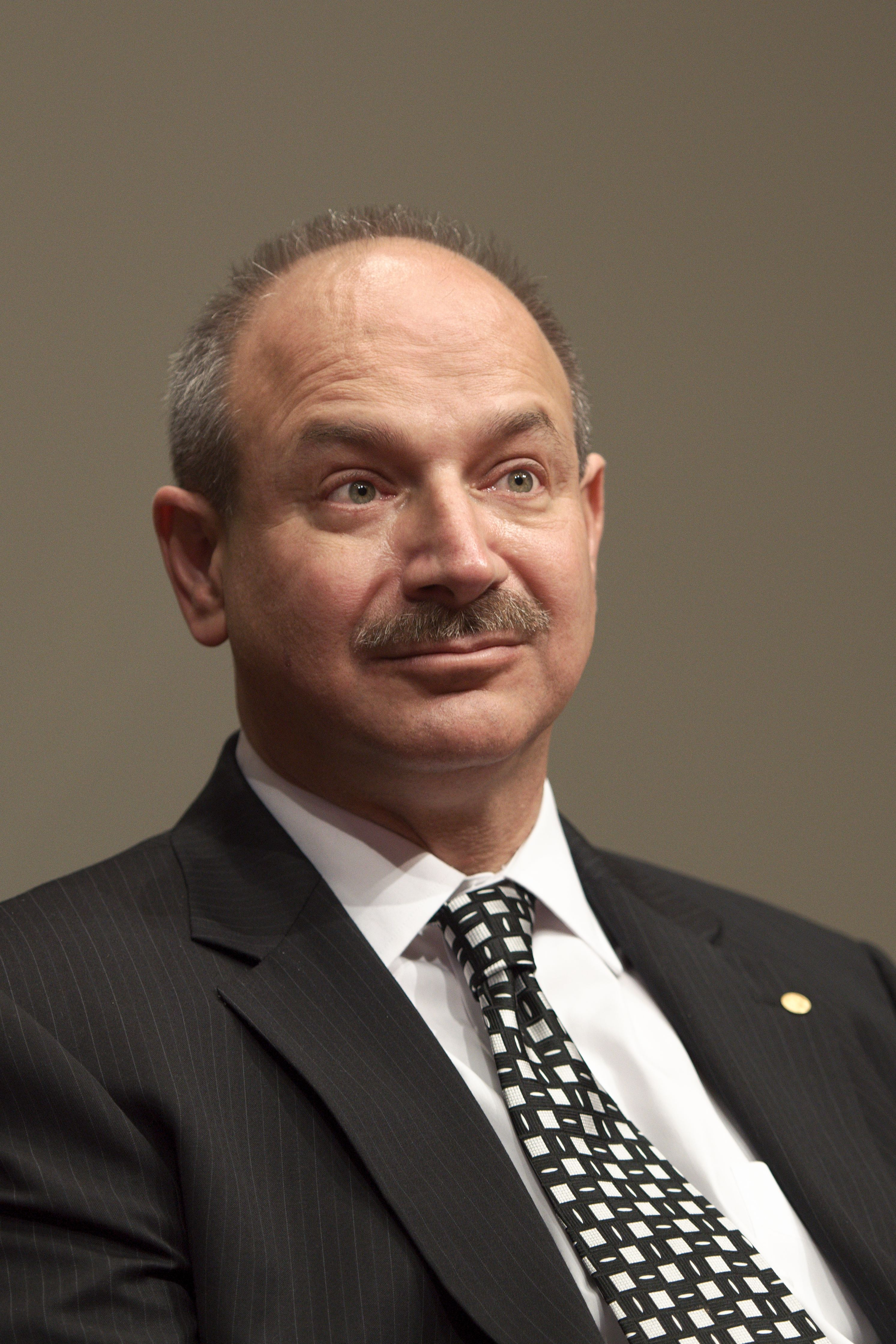
Bruce Beutler

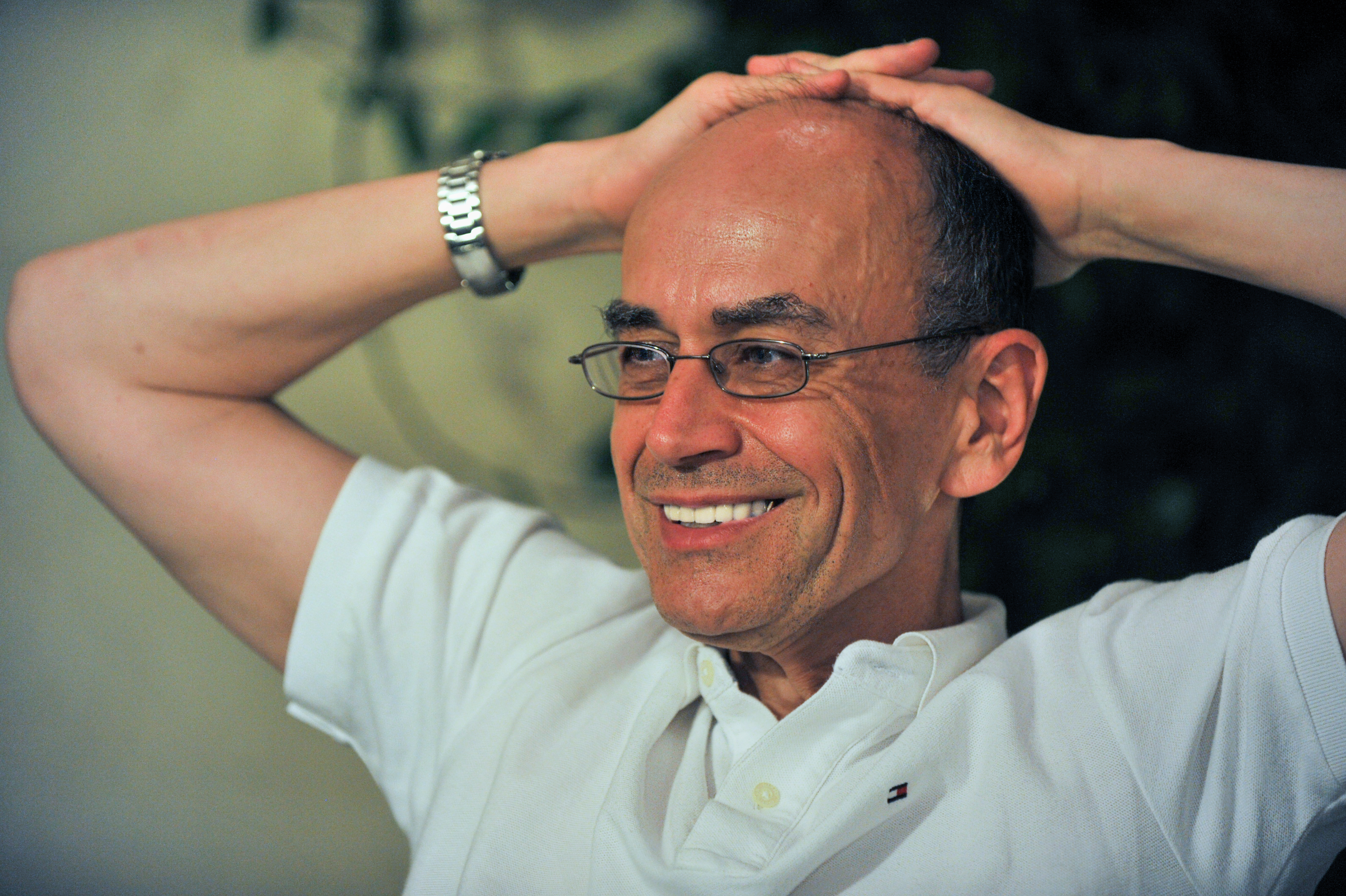
Thomas Sudhof

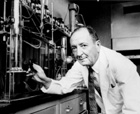
Alfred G. Gilman

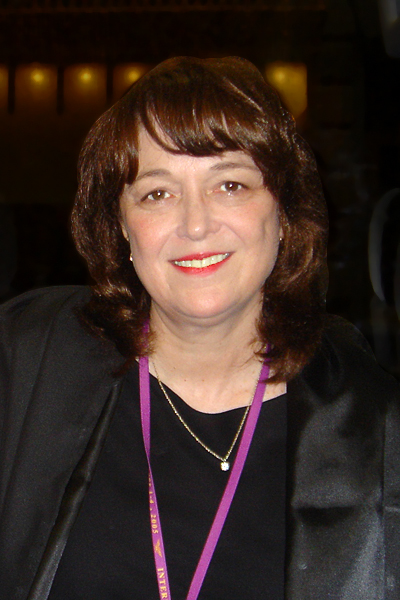
Linda Buck

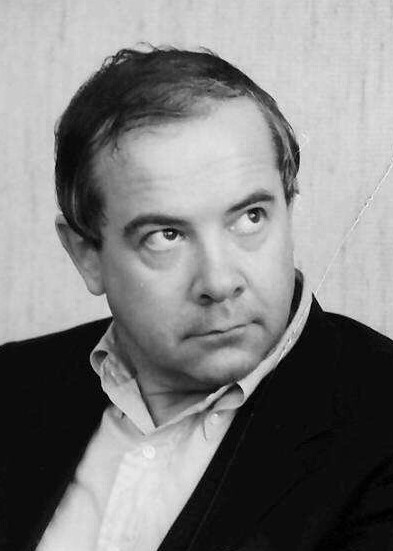
Johann Deisenhofer

Seven UT Southwestern alumni or faculty members have been awarded Nobel Prizes. These are:

- Michael Stuart Brown and Joseph L. Goldstein, in 1985, shared the Nobel Prize in Physiology or Medicine for their discovery of the basic mechanism of cholesterol metabolism. Goldstein is Chairman of Molecular Genetics at UT Southwestern, and Brown directs the Erik Jonsson Center for Research in Molecular Genetics and Human Disease
- Johann Deisenhofer, Professor of Biochemistry and a Howard Hughes Medical Institute Investigator at UT Southwestern, shared the 1988 Nobel Prize in Chemistry for using X-ray crystallography to describe the structure of a protein involved in photosynthesis
- Alfred G. Gilman shared the 1994 Nobel Prize in Physiology or Medicine for the discovery of G proteins and the role they play in the complex processes by which cells communicate with each other. Gilman, a Regental Professor Emeritus who died in December 2015, was Dean of UT Southwestern Medical School
- Bruce Beutler, Director of the Center for the Genetics of Host Defense, shared the 2011 Nobel Prize in Physiology or Medicine with two other scientists for their immune system investigations. Beutler was honored for the discovery of receptor proteins that recognize disease-causing agents and activate innate immunity
- Thomas C. Südhof, Adjunct Professor of Neuroscience and former chair of the department at UT Southwestern, shared the 2013 Nobel Prize in Physiology or Medicine with two other scientists for discoveries about cellular transport systems. Südhof, now at Stanford University School of Medicine, was recognized for his pioneering work at UT Southwestern on synaptic transmission^{[14]}
- Linda B. Buck received the 2004 award Nobel Prize in Physiology or Medicine jointly with Richard Axel for their work on olfactory receptors. She completed her doctorate at UT Southwestern and is currently a Full Member of the Basic Sciences Division at the Fred Hutchinson Cancer Research Center and an Affiliate Professor of Physiology and Biophysics at the University of Washington

=== Notable faculty ===
Among the notable faculty of UTSW are twenty seven members of the National Academy of Sciences, twenty four members of the National Academy of Medicine, and fourteen Howard Hughes Medical Institute Investigators.

- Robert Lenkinski, Professor in Medical Science at University of Texas Southwestern Medical Center.

=== Alumni ===
- Jim C. Barnett (M.D. 1949) (deceased 2013), Member of the Mississippi House of Representatives from 1992 to 2008^{[16]}
- Charles R. Baxter (M.D. 1954) (deceased 2005), the inventor of the Parkland Formula and one of John F. Kennedy's surgeons
- Linda B. Buck, (Ph.D. 1980) 2004 Nobel Laureate in Physiology or Medicine for work on olfactory receptors, currently an HHMI investigator at Fred Hutchinson Cancer Research Center
- Robert Cade, (M.D. 1954) (deceased 2007) professor of medicine and nephrology at the University of Florida, formulated Gatorade
- Daniel W. Foster, (M.D. 1955) (deceased 2018) UTSW chairman department of medicine, holder of the UTSW John Denis McGarry, Ph.D., Distinguished Chair in Diabetes and Metabolic Research
- Richard Gaynor, MD specializing in hematology-oncology, educator, drug developer, and business executive.
- Brett Giroir, (M.D. 1986), 16th United States Assistant Secretary for Health and admiral in the United States Public Health Service Commissioned Corps
- Joseph L. Goldstein, (M.D. 1966) currently Chairman of the Department of Molecular Genetics at UTSW
- Malcolm Perry, (M.D. 1955) (deceased 2009) while a surgery resident attended to John F. Kennedy at Parkland Memorial Hospital on November 22, 1963, chief of vascular surgery New York-Cornell Hospital 1978 to 1988, professor of surgery Texas Tech University, professor emeritus UTSW
- Stuart Spitzer (M.D. 1971?), incoming Republican member of the Texas House of Representatives from District 4
- Richard Warshak, (Ph.D. 1978) clinical and research psychologist; expert in divorce, child custody, and parental alienation; served as a White House consultant on family law reform
- Xiaodong Wang (Ph.D.), biomedical researcher, member of the National Academy of Science 2004, Shaw Prize in Life Science and Medicine 2006, Director National Institute of Biological Sciences, Beijing
- Kern Wildenthal (M.D. 1964) president of the Children's Medical Center Foundation in Dallas, President Emeritus and Professor of Medicine Emeritus UTSW, president UTSW 1986–2008
