= Storrie (surname) =

Storrie is a surname. Notable people with the surname include:

- Agnes L. Storrie (1864-1936), Australian poet and writer
- Ashley Storrie (born 1986), Scottish stand-up comedian, actor and writer
- Becky Storrie (born 1998), Manx cyclist
- Connor Storrie (born 2000), American actor
- James Storrie (1885-1951), Scottish cricketer
- Jim Storrie (1940–2014), Scottish footballer and manager
- Peter Storrie (born 1952), English football executive
- Sandy Storrie (born 1962), British Army general
- Walter Storrie (1875-1945), Scottish cricketer
- William Storrie (died 1900), Australian businessman and politician
