= Hawick Cottage Hospital =

- NHS Borders
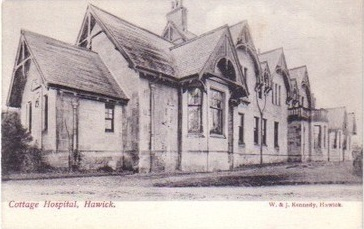
- Hawick Cottage Hospital

- Shown in Scottish Borders

Geography
- Location: Buccleugh Road, Hawick, Scotland
- Coordinates: 55.4209°N 2.7969°W

Organisation
- Care system: NHS Scotland
- Type: General

Services
- Emergency department: No

History
- Founded: 1884
- Closed: 2005

Links
- Lists: Hospitals in Scotland

Hawick Cottage Hospital was a health facility at Buccleuch Road in Hawick, Scotland. It was managed by NHS Borders. It is a Category B listed building.

== History ==
The foundation stone for the hospital, which was designed by John McLachlan, was laid by the Earl of Mar and Kellie in August 1884. The hospital was opened in August 1885. The Minto Wing, which was financed by a gift from Violet Astor, was opened by the Prince of Wales in 1926. The hospital joined the National Health Service in 1948. After services transferred to the Hawick Community Hospital in 2005, Hawick Cottage Hospital closed and is now on the Buildings at Risk Register.
