= Teribus ye teri odin =

Hawick war cry

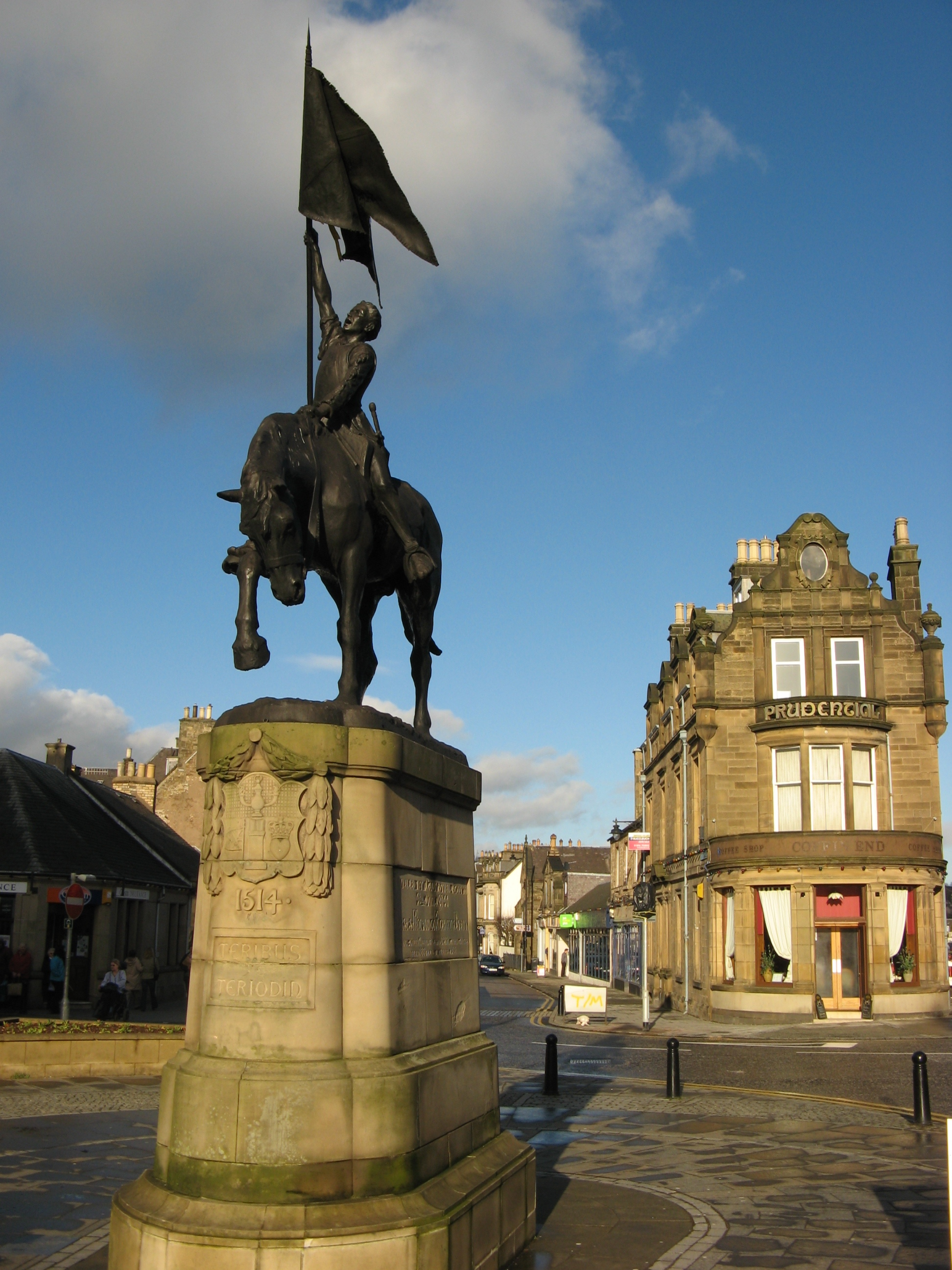
Equestrian statue in Hawick commemorating the Battle of Hornshole (1514). The plinth shows the coat of arms of the town and the motto "Teribus Teriodin".

"Teribus ye teri odin" or "teribus an teriodin" (Scots pronunciation: [ˈtirɪbəs ən ˌtiri ˈodɪn]) is a slogan or war cry associated with the Scottish town of Hawick. It forms the refrain of the song "Teribus", which is traditionally sung at the annual common riding. Inhabitants of the town are known as "Teries" in reference to the slogan.

The earliest attestations of the slogan date from the 18th century, although it is reputed to have been used at Flodden. Attempts have been made to connect it with the names of the heathen gods Tyr and Odin, the original form supposedly being Tyr hæbbe us, ge Tyr ge Oðinn (Old English for "Tyr keep us, both Tyr and Odin"). The Scottish National Dictionary dismisses this, noting that the correct Old English names for the gods were Tiw and Woden and that it is "barely conceivable" that an Old English phrase could have survived almost unaltered into the modern period. According to the dictionary, the phrase is more likely to be "a succession of meaningless syllables meant to represent the sound of a march played on drums and bagpipes".

In 1819, local stocking-maker and poet James Hogg (not to be confused with the Ettrick Shepherd) wrote the ballad "The Colour", also known as "Teribus". The ballad tells the story of the disastrous Battle of Flodden and the subsequent skirmish at Hornshole (1514), in which a group of youths from Hawick triumphed over an English raiding party and captured their standard. The chorus goes:

Teribus ye teri odin
Sons of heroes slain at Flodden
Imitating Border bowmen
Aye defend your rights and common

Hogg's ballad became a regular feature of the annual common riding of Hawick, replacing an earlier version composed by Arthur Balbirnie, and is still sung today.

== See also ==
- Flowers of the Forest
