= Coldstream Cottage Hospital =

- NHS Borders
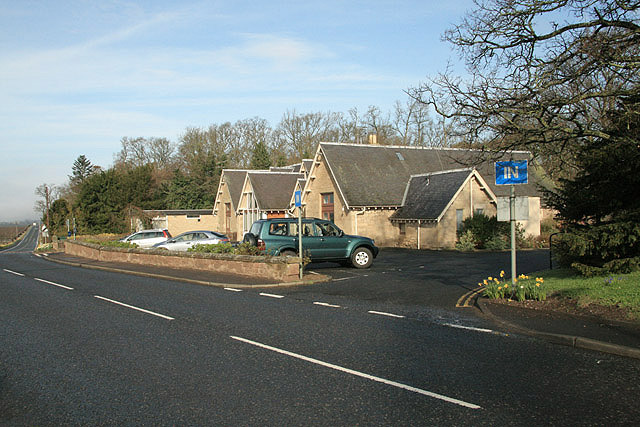
- Coldstream Cottage Hospital

- Shown in the Scottish Borders

Geography
- Location: Scotland
- Coordinates: 55.6476°N 2.2643°W

Organisation
- Care system: NHS
- Type: Community hospital

History
- Founded: 1888
- Closed: 2006

Links
- Other links: List of hospitals in Scotland

Coldstream Cottage Hospital was a community hospital located at Coldstream in Scotland. It was managed by NHS Borders.

== History ==
The hospital was established following a donation from the Earl of Home. It was designed by John McLachlan and opened in 1888. It was extended by the addition of a second floor in 1912. It joined the National Health Service in 1948, but, following a consultation, it closed in October 2006.
