= List of listed buildings in Coldstream, Scottish Borders =

This is a list of listed buildings in the parish of Coldstream in the Scottish Borders, Scotland.

== List ==
Name	Location	Date listed	Grid ref. (Note: Sometimes known as OSGB36, the grid reference (where provided) is based on the British national grid reference system used by the Ordnance Survey. • "Guide to National Grid". Ordnance Survey. • "Get-a-map". Ordnance Survey.)	Geo-coordinates	Notes	LB number (Note: Historic Environment Scotland assign a unique alphanumeric identifier to each designated site in Scotland, for listed buildings this always begins with "LB", for example "LB12345".)	Image
High Street, Town Hall				55°39′07″N 2°15′04″W	Category B	23072	Upload another image See more images
81 High Street, Victoria House				55°39′09″N 2°15′03″W	Category B	23073	Upload Photo
2 High Street				55°38′59″N 2°15′21″W	Category C(S)	23074	Upload Photo
8 High Street				55°38′59″N 2°15′20″W	Category C(S)	23077	Upload Photo
54-56 (Even) High Street				55°39′04″N 2°15′10″W	Category C(S)	23086	Upload Photo
66, 68 High Street				55°39′05″N 2°15′06″W	Category C(S)	23090	Upload Photo
Kelso Road, The Lees, Temple				55°38′40″N 2°15′11″W	Category B	23107	Upload Photo
Market Square, Cameron House				55°39′00″N 2°15′04″W	Category B	23114	Upload Photo
2 Willowbank				55°39′01″N 2°14′59″W	Category C(S)	23124	Upload Photo
Court House Lodge, Court House Place				55°39′01″N 2°15′21″W	Category C(S)	23038	Upload Photo
1 High Street				55°39′00″N 2°15′21″W	Category C(S)	23049	Upload Photo
23 High Street				55°39′02″N 2°15′17″W	Category C(S)	23059	Upload Photo
25 High Street				55°39′03″N 2°15′16″W	Category B	23060	Upload Photo
6 High Street, White Swan				55°38′59″N 2°15′20″W	Category C(S)	23076	Upload Photo
24, 26 High Street				55°39′01″N 2°15′17″W	Category C(S)	23079	Upload Photo
28 High Street				55°39′01″N 2°15′17″W	Category C(S)	23080	Upload Photo
38 High Street				55°39′02″N 2°15′15″W	Category C(S)	23082	Upload Photo
84 High Street				55°39′06″N 2°15′03″W	Category C(S)	23098	Upload Photo
Church Lane Cornstore				55°39′04″N 2°15′08″W	Category C(S)	23035	Upload Photo
1, 2 Court House Place				55°39′01″N 2°15′20″W	Category C(S)	23036	Upload Photo
5, 6 Court House Place				55°39′01″N 2°15′20″W	Category C(S)	23037	Upload Photo
3 High Street				55°39′00″N 2°15′21″W	Category C(S)	23050	Upload Photo
15 High Street				55°39′02″N 2°15′18″W	Category B	23055	Upload Photo
51, 53 High Street				55°39′05″N 2°15′08″W	Category B	23067	Upload Photo
61-67 (Odd Nos) High Street				55°39′06″N 2°15′06″W	Category B	23070	Upload Photo
The Hirsel, Homestead				55°39′18″N 2°16′30″W	Category B	4070	Upload another image
69 High Street				55°39′06″N 2°15′05″W	Category B	23071	Upload Photo
10 High Street				55°39′00″N 2°15′19″W	Category C(S)	23078	Upload Photo
46 High Street				55°39′03″N 2°15′13″W	Category B	23084	Upload Photo
58, 60 High Street				55°39′04″N 2°15′09″W	Category C(S)	23087	Upload Photo
80 High Street				55°39′06″N 2°15′04″W	Category C(S)	23096	Upload Photo
Kelso Road, Lees Farm, East Range				55°38′59″N 2°15′25″W	Category C(S)	23110	Upload Photo
12, 13 Market Square, Guards House				55°39′02″N 2°15′03″W	Category B	23113	Upload Photo
23 Market Square, Crown Hotel				55°39′00″N 2°15′04″W	Category C(S)	23116	Upload Photo
Abbey Road Abbey House				55°39′00″N 2°14′58″W	Category B	23034	Upload Photo
31 Duke Street				55°38′58″N 2°15′18″W	Category C(S)	23041	Upload Photo
17 High Street				55°39′02″N 2°15′18″W	Category B	23056	Upload Photo
31-35 (Odd) High Street				55°39′04″N 2°15′12″W	Category C(S)	23064	Upload Photo
The Hirsel				55°39′36″N 2°16′22″W	Category A	4069	Upload another image
Milne Graden				55°41′29″N 2°11′51″W	Category B	4072	Upload another image See more images
The Marriage House, Colstream Bridge				55°39′18″N 2°14′32″W	Category B	4074	Upload another image
50 High Street, Newcastle Arms				55°39′03″N 2°15′11″W	Category C(S)	23085	Upload Photo
62, 64 High Street				55°39′05″N 2°15′08″W	Category B	23088	Upload Photo
74 High Street				55°39′06″N 2°15′05″W	Category C(S)	23093	Upload Photo
78 High Street				55°39′06″N 2°15′04″W	Category C(S)	23095	Upload Photo
86 High Street				55°39′06″N 2°15′03″W	Category B	23099	Upload Photo
29 Market Square				55°39′00″N 2°15′07″W	Category C(S)	23119	Upload Photo
Willowbank, Marjoriebanks Of Lees Burial Ground				55°39′01″N 2°14′59″W	Category C(S)	23122	Upload Photo
1, 2 Duke Street				55°39′02″N 2°15′09″W	Category B	23040	Upload Photo
Duns Road, Woodside House				55°39′14″N 2°15′19″W	Category B	23047	Upload Photo
The Hirsel Obelisk In Park, Home Memorial				55°39′55″N 2°17′15″W	Category B	4071	Upload Photo
30, 32 High Street, Commercial Inn				55°39′01″N 2°15′17″W	Category C(S)	23081	Upload Photo
72 High Street				55°39′05″N 2°15′05″W	Category C(S)	23092	Upload Photo
88 High Street, Bank Of Scotland				55°39′07″N 2°15′02″W	Category B	23101	Upload Photo
100, 100C High Street				55°39′09″N 2°14′58″W	Category B	23102	Upload Photo
Kelso Road, The Lees, Lodge, Gatepiers And Gates				55°38′54″N 2°15′29″W	Category B	23104	Upload Photo
Kelso Road The Lees Policies Of: Icehouse				55°38′50″N 2°15′26″W	Category C(S)	23105	Upload Photo
1,2,3 Dovecote				55°38′57″N 2°15′16″W	Category B	23039	Upload Photo
Duns Road, Lodge And Gatepiers To Hope Park				55°39′15″N 2°15′20″W	Category C(S)	23044	Upload Photo
5 High Street				55°39′00″N 2°15′21″W	Category C(S)	23051	Upload Photo
7 High Street				55°39′00″N 2°15′20″W	Category C(S)	23052	Upload Photo
11 High Street, Castle Hotel				55°39′01″N 2°15′20″W	Category B	23054	Upload Photo
Lennel Church				55°39′50″N 2°13′42″W	Category B	4067	Upload Photo
76 High Street				55°39′06″N 2°15′05″W	Category C(S)	23094	Upload Photo
Kelso Road, Lees Farm, Cottages				55°38′57″N 2°15′27″W	Category C(S)	23111	Upload Photo
Duns Road, Hope Park				55°39′14″N 2°15′13″W	Category B	23042	Upload Photo
Duns Road, The Manse				55°39′12″N 2°15′20″W	Category B	23046	Upload Photo
Guards Road, Trafalgar House, Formerly The Manse				55°39′12″N 2°15′03″W	Category B	23048	Upload Photo
21 High Street				55°39′02″N 2°15′17″W	Category B	23058	Upload Photo
27 High Street				55°39′03″N 2°15′16″W	Category B	23061	Upload Photo
37 High Street				55°39′04″N 2°15′11″W	Category B	23065	Upload Photo
59 High Street				55°39′06″N 2°15′07″W	Category B	23069	Upload Photo
Milne Graden Estate, West Lodge Including Gatepiers And Gates				55°41′38″N 2°12′33″W	Category C(S)	209	Upload Photo
44 High Street				55°39′03″N 2°15′13″W	Category B	23083	Upload Photo
High Street, Coldstream Parish Church				55°39′05″N 2°15′07″W	Category B	23089	Upload Photo
70 High Street				55°39′05″N 2°15′05″W	Category C(S)	23091	Upload Photo
82 High Street				55°39′06″N 2°15′04″W	Category C(S)	23097	Upload Photo
Kelso Road, The Lees				55°38′45″N 2°15′18″W	Category B	23103	Upload Photo
Kelso Road, Lees, Farm, Main Steading				55°38′58″N 2°15′26″W	Category B	23108	Upload Photo
Workshop At Rear Of Cameron House, Market Square				55°39′00″N 2°15′03″W	Category C(S)	23115	Upload Photo
The Red Lion, Market Street				55°39′02″N 2°15′09″W	Category C(S)	23120	Upload Photo
Duns Road, Hope Park Outbuilding				55°39′14″N 2°15′13″W	Category C(S)	23043	Upload Photo
55, 57 High Street				55°39′06″N 2°15′07″W	Category C(S)	23068	Upload Photo
Lennel House				55°39′37″N 2°14′15″W	Category A	4068	Upload another image
Stables, Milne Graden				55°41′34″N 2°11′47″W	Category B	4073	Upload Photo
75 High Street, The Besom Inn				55°39′08″N 2°15′03″W	Category C(S)	51122	Upload another image See more images
4 High Street				55°38′59″N 2°15′20″W	Category C(S)	23075	Upload Photo
High Street, Henderson Park, Gazebo				55°39′06″N 2°14′58″W	Category B	23100	Upload Photo
Kelso Road, The Lees, Stables				55°38′52″N 2°15′19″W	Category B	23106	Upload Photo
Kelso Road, Lees Farm, Stable Block				55°38′59″N 2°15′26″W	Category C(S)	23109	Upload Photo
15 Leet Street				55°38′59″N 2°15′13″W	Category C(S)	23112	Upload Photo
24, 25 Market Square				55°39′00″N 2°15′05″W	Category C(S)	23117	Upload Photo
27, 28 Market Square				55°39′00″N 2°15′06″W	Category C(S)	23118	Upload Photo
Tweed Terrace, Monument To Charles Marjoriebanks Mp				55°39′12″N 2°14′50″W	Category B	23121	Upload another image
1 Willowbank, Arden House				55°39′02″N 2°14′59″W	Category C(S)	23123	Upload Photo
Duns Road, Ivy Lodge				55°39′13″N 2°15′18″W	Category B	23045	Upload Photo
9 High Street				55°39′00″N 2°15′20″W	Category C(S)	23053	Upload Photo
19 High Street				55°39′02″N 2°15′17″W	Category B	23057	Upload Photo
High Street Church Centre				55°39′04″N 2°15′15″W	Category B	23062	Upload Photo
29 High Street Keith House				55°39′04″N 2°15′13″W	Category B	23063	Upload Photo
39 High Street				55°39′05″N 2°15′10″W	Category C(S)	23066	Upload Photo
Coldstream Bridge				55°39′16″N 2°14′31″W	Category A	4075	Upload Photo

== Key ==
The scheme for classifying buildings in Scotland is:

- Category A: "buildings of national or international importance, either architectural or historic; or fine, little-altered examples of some particular period, style or building type."
- Category B: "buildings of regional or more than local importance; or major examples of some particular period, style or building type, which may have been altered."
- Category C: "buildings of local importance; lesser examples of any period, style, or building type, as originally constructed or moderately altered; and simple traditional buildings which group well with other listed buildings."

In March 2016 there were 47,288 listed buildings in Scotland. Of these, 8% were Category A, and 50% were Category B, with the remaining 42% being Category C.
