= Hawick Community Hospital =

- NHS Borders
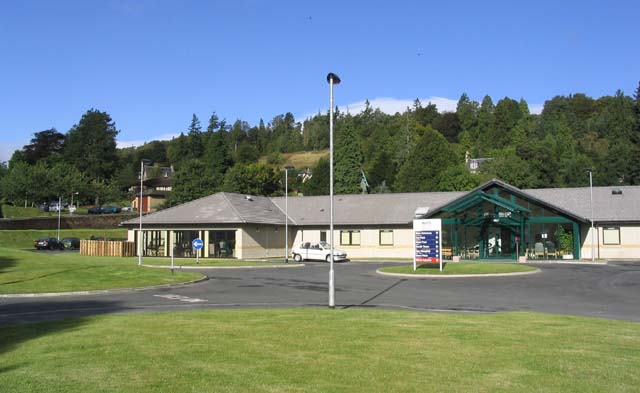
- Hawick Community Hospital

- Shown in Scottish Borders

Geography
- Location: Victoria Road, Hawick, Scotland
- Coordinates: 55.4236°N 2.7944°W

Organisation
- Care system: NHS Scotland
- Type: General

Services
- Emergency department: No

History
- Founded: 2005

Links
- Lists: Hospitals in Scotland

Hawick Community Hospital is a health facility at Victoria Road in Hawick, Scotland. It is managed by NHS Borders.

== History ==
The hospital was commissioned to replace the ageing Hawick Cottage Hospital. It was built by Border Construction on the site of a former Pringle of Scotland factory at a cost of £4.5 million and opened in 2005.
