= Hay Lodge Hospital =

- NHS Borders
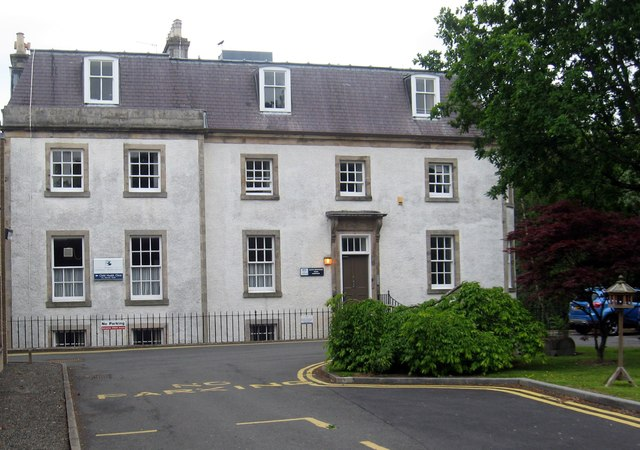
- Hay Lodge

- Shown in Scottish Borders

Geography
- Location: Neidpath Road, Peebles, Scotland
- Coordinates: 55.6519°N 3.1985°W

Organisation
- Care system: NHS Scotland
- Type: General

Services
- Emergency department: No

History
- Founded: 1983

Links
- Lists: Hospitals in Scotland

Hay Lodge Hospital is a health facility at Neidpath Road in Peebles, Scotland. It is managed by NHS Borders. Hay Lodge is a Category B listed building.

== History ==
The hospital was commissioned to replace the ageing Peebles County Hospital on Rosetta Road and the Peebles War Memorial Hospital on Tweed Green. It was established by building modern hospital facilities in the grounds of Hay Lodge, a late 18th-century building, in 1983. (Note: Hay Lodge had been built as the home of Captain Adam Hay MP, an officer in the 6th Regiment of Foot, in c.1770.) Hay Lodge was itself converted to become the administration and staff quarters of the hospital. The hospital was forced to suspend admissions because of a sickness outbreak in January 2020.
