= Kelso Hospital =

- NHS Borders
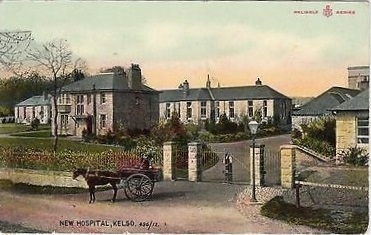
- Kelso Hospital

- Shown in Scottish Borders

Geography
- Location: Inch Road, Kelso, Scotland
- Coordinates: 55.6027°N 2.4355°W

Organisation
- Care system: NHS Scotland
- Type: General

Services
- Emergency department: No

History
- Founded: 1854

Links
- Lists: Hospitals in Scotland

Kelso Hospital, also known as Inch Hospital, is a health facility at Inch Road in Kelso, Scotland. It is managed by NHS Borders.

== History ==
The hospital has its origins in the Kelso Union Workhouse which was designed by John Smith (1783-1864) and opened in 1854. It was converted for hospital use, based on a design by Scottish architect James Alison (1862-1932), in 1911. It joined the National Health Service in 1948 and subsequently became known as "Inch Hospital". (Note: It was known as "Inch Hospital" to distinguish from the Cottage hospital, which has since closed, on Jedburgh Road)
