= John McLachlan (architect) =

Scottish architect

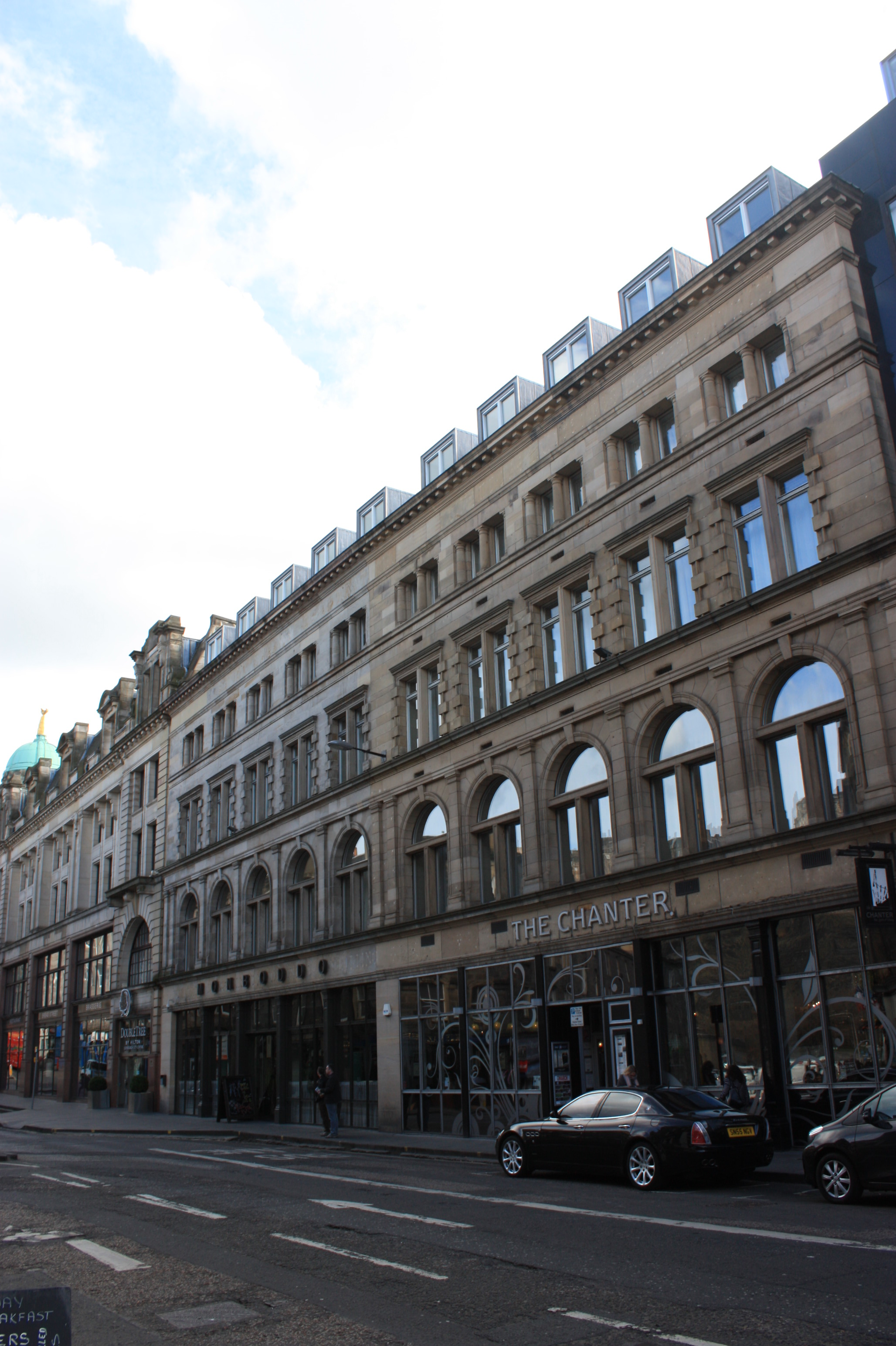
Bread Street, Edinburgh by John McLachlan

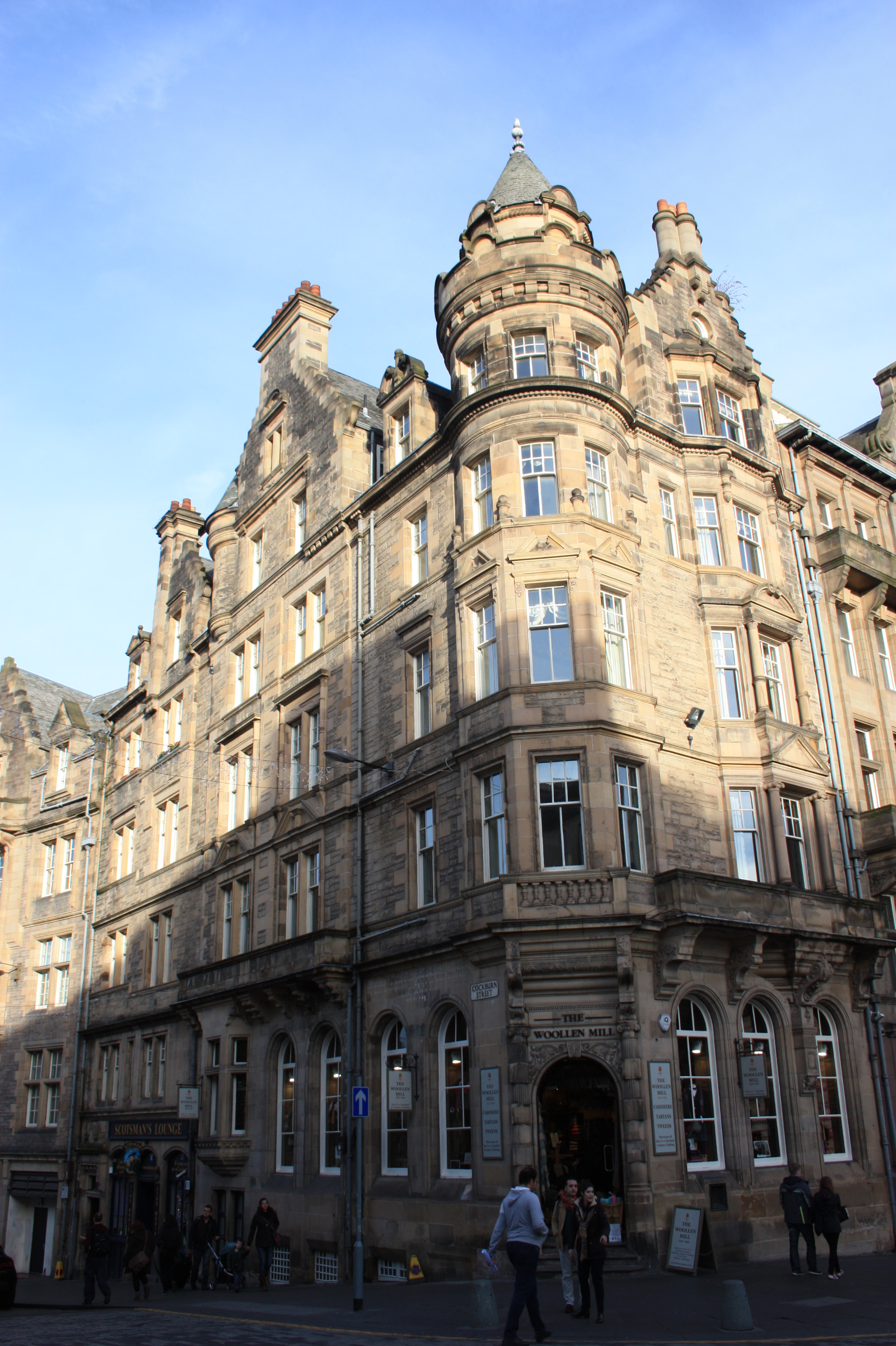
Building on the corner of Royal Mile and Cockburn Street by John McLachlan

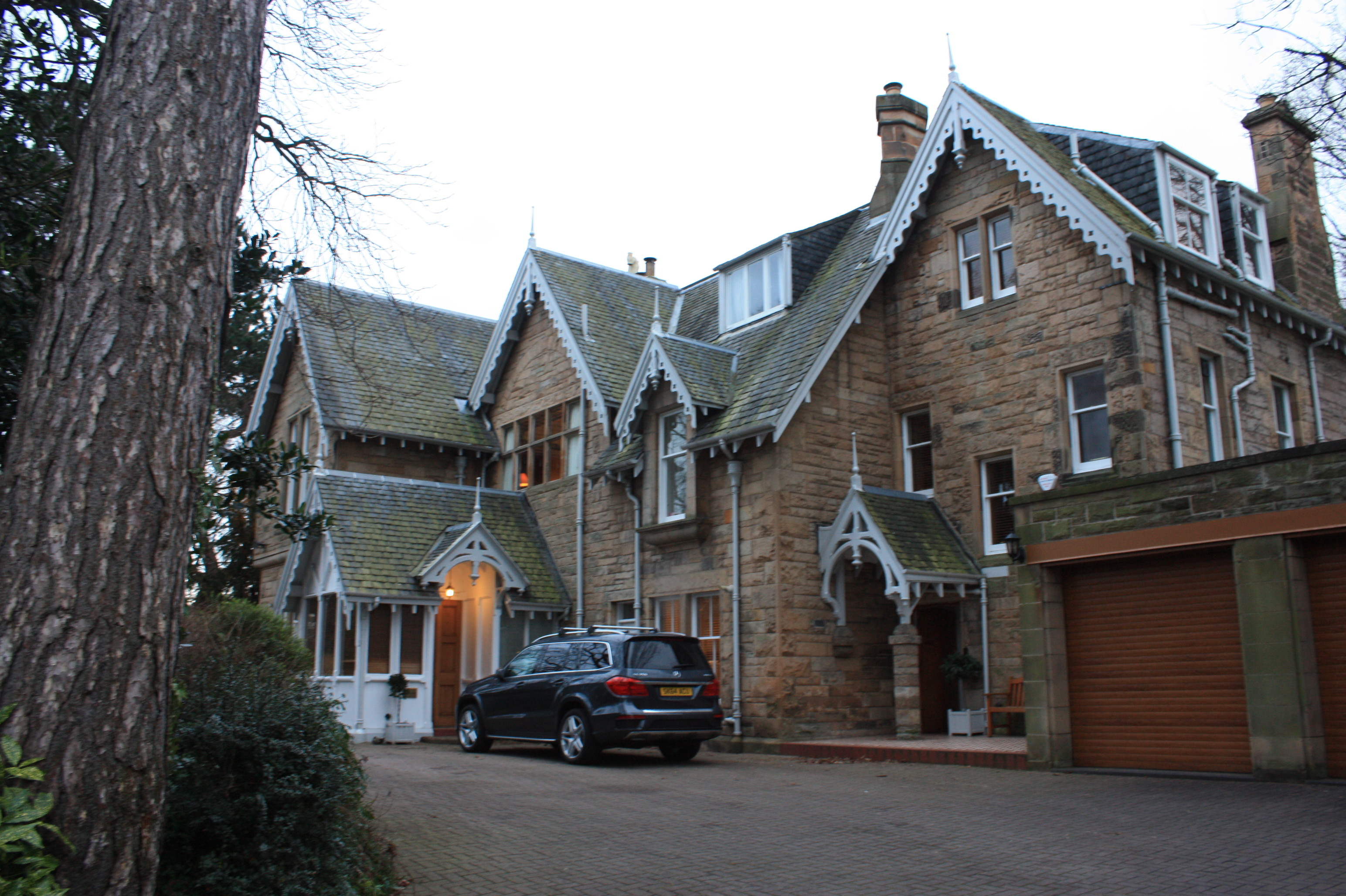
11 Tipperlinn Road by John McLachlan

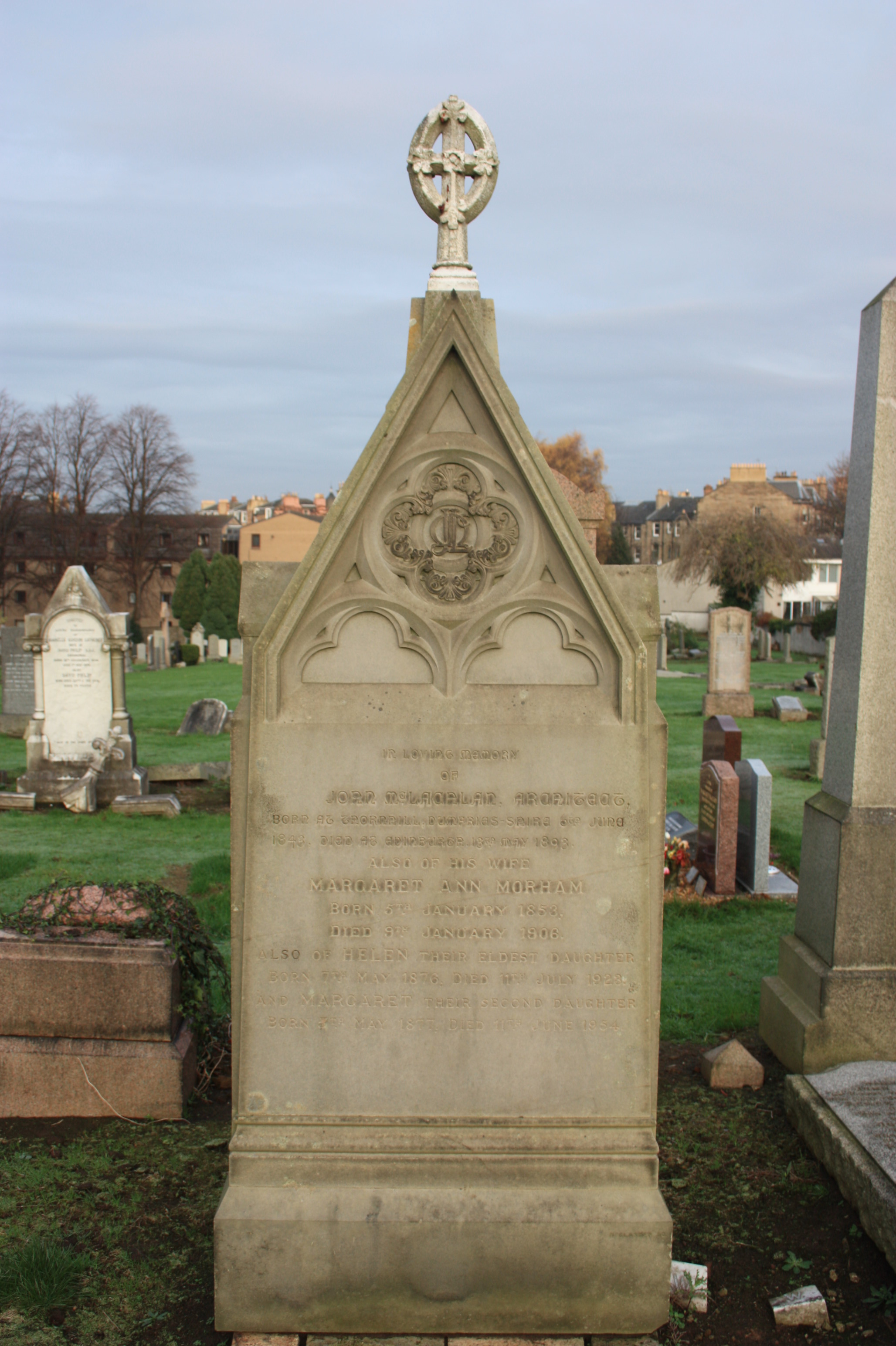
The grave of John McLachlan, Morningside Cemetery, Edinburgh

John McLachlan (6 June 1843 – 13 May 1893) was a Scottish architect, based in Edinburgh operating in the late 19th century. He was a brother-in-law to Robert Morham. He has been described as a "minor master".

== Life ==
He was born in Thornhill in Dumfries in 1843.

In 1857 he was articled to the Edinburgh architect David Cousin. In Cousin's office, he worked with Robert Morham and through him met Margaret Ann Morham (1853–1906), Robert's sister, whom he married. In 1868 he started his own practice and by 1878 had prestigious offices at York Buildings in the New Town.

In 1884 he became the architect of the National Bank of Scotland, and in 1892 succeeded Hippolyte Blanc as architect to the Scottish Co-operative Association.

Later, he formed a business association with Thomas P. Marwick and his architectural style changed from Victorian Baronial to Queen Anne Revival. Marwick took over his offices at 29 York Place, following McLachlan's death.

He died very young, aged only 49, at home at 33 Queens Crescent, and was buried in Morningside Cemetery, Edinburgh, near the southern edge. His wife, Margaret Ann Morham (sister of Robert Morham, who also died relatively young, is buried with him. The grave lies back-to-back with Robert Morham and Margaret's parents. Their son John Morham McLachlan (1888–1927) lies alongside.

Thomas P. Marwick died many years later but is also buried close to him.

== Works ==
All works are in Edinburgh unless otherwise stated:

- Corner block, St Marys Street/Cowgate (1871 – demolished 1975)
- 50-56 Shandwick Place (1878)
- Villa, 57 Fountainhall Road (1881)
- Office, 4 St Andrew Square (1883 –?demolished 2014)
- Terraced houses, 8-11 Ventnor Terrace (1883)
- Hawick Cottage Hospital (1884)
- Villa, 55 Fountainhall Road (1884)
- Warehouses, Caledonian Distillery (1887)
- National Bank of Scotland, Selkirk, Scottish Borders (1887)
- Coldstream Cottage Hospital (1888)
- Villa, 11 Tipperlinn Road (1888)
- National Bank of Scotland, 142 Princes Street (1888) retained as a facade to the Royal Bank of Scotland
- The "Abbotsford" bar, Rose Street (1890)
- Miller's Foundry, London Road (1890) fragments retained as part of the Meadowbank Retail Centre.
- Scottish Co-operative Buildings, Bread Street (1892) (extended in the same style by Thomas P. Marwick in 1898)
- Royal Bank of Scotland, Royal Mile/ Cockburn Street (1892–93)

== Churches ==
McLachlan also built several Free Churches (and was presumably a member of the Free Church of Scotland): Yester (1881); Linktown (1883); Sheuchan (Stranraer) (1883); Wardie UP Church (1892) (now called Wardie Parish Church).
