= Hawico =

Scottish knitwear brand

Hawick Cashmere Company Ltd
- Trade name: Hawico
- Industry: Fashion
- Founded: 1874; 152 years ago
- Website: www.hawico.com

Hawico is a Scottish fashion brand established in 1874 and specialising in knitwear.

== History ==
The company was founded as The Hawick Hosiery Company in 1874. A mill was opened on Duke Street, Hawick. As of 2022, the company still produces knitwear in the same location. It was originally a wholesale manufacturer, mainly supplying department stores like Harrods, Jenners, and Harvey Nichols. The Hawico brand was established in the early years of the company as a trade name for consumers.

In 1991, the mill was bought by Jim Thomson and David Sanderson, who started The Hawick Cashmere Company. In 1995, it received the British Apparel Export Award.

The first dedicated store was opened in 1995 in Harrogate, England. Since then, other stores have been opened in Stow-on-the-Wold, Villars, Edinburgh, Geneva, Baden-Baden, St Moritz, Beaver Creek, Tokyo, London, Zurich, Milan, and Sylt. Garments are sold under the name Hawico in Europe, and as Hawick Cashmere in Japan and the United States.
