= Scott & Charters =

Scottish knitwear brand

- Trade name: Scott & Charters
- Industry: Fashion
- Founded: 1955; 71 years ago
- Owner: Begg & Co

Scott & Charters is a Scottish luxury knitwear manufacturer based in Hawick, in the Scottish Borders. Founded in 1955, the company specialises in cashmere knitwear and is part of the long tradition of knitwear manufacturing in Hawick, a town historically associated with fine wool and cashmere production.

== History ==
Scott & Charters was founded in 1955 in Hawick. The company developed as part of the town's knitwear industry, which transitioned from underwear and woollen garments to cashmere knitwear during the 20th century.

In 2015, Scott & Charters was acquired by WRA Group, the parent company of the London luxury retailer William & Son. Following the acquisition, Malcolm Grant, a Hawick native with long experience in the cashmere industry, was appointed managing director. Under WRA ownership, the company invested in a new purpose-built factory at Fairhurst Drive in Hawick, which was officially opened in 2019 by Prince Charles.

In 2020, WRA Group entered voluntary administration due to financial difficulties. Scott & Charters itself did not enter administration and continued operating as a separate entity, maintaining production and shipping orders. At the time, the company employed approximately 38 workers.

Later in 2020, Scott & Charters was acquired by Begg x Co, a Scottish luxury knitwear and accessories company founded in 1866. Following the acquisition, Scott & Charters continued to operate as a separate company, catering to bespoke and external clients, while also contributing to the development of Begg x Co's knitwear collections.

== Production ==
Scott & Charters specialises in cashmere knitwear, including sweaters and cardigans, produced in Hawick using traditional manufacturing techniques combined with modern knitting technology. The company sources high-quality cashmere yarns spun in Scotland, including from Todd & Duncan in Kinross.

Production involves both modern machinery and extensive hand-finishing, with workers specialising in assembly, stitching, and quality control. Output is limited, with production estimated at 500 pieces per week.
