= Tom Jenkins (teacher) =

First British school teacher of African heritage

Tom Jenkins (also known as Thomas Joseph Jenkins, and Black Tom; c. 1797 – 1859) was Britain's first black school teacher.

== Early life ==
Jenkins was the son of a native chief, according to an 1818 letter. Born along the Guinea coast, he was possibly the son of a slave-trading chief 'King Cock-eye'. As an infant (also reported as aged 6), Jenkins traveled with Scottish sea captain James Swanson to Britain, leaving Africa in January 1803 and arriving in Liverpool in May of the same year before traveling to the Scottish Borders town of Hawick. Swanson was a resident of Hawick. After Swanson's death from illness in September 1803, Jenkins lived with Swanson's relatives in the area.

It is suggested alternatively that his name 'Tom Jenkins' was his attempt as a child on the 1803 voyage to pronounce the name of his sponsor Swanson, or a variant of his African title.

After Hawick, Jenkins moved to near Teviothead, learning English and the local dialect. Excelling at school, and a good dancer, he became a labourer.

== Teaching profession ==
At the age of 20, Jenkins became the schoolmaster at Teviothead; the appointment not approved by the Presbytery. In response, a blacksmith's building was converted into an independent school by the Duke of Buccleuch and others from 1815 to December 1818. Continuing his education including studying Greek and Latin languages, Jenkins was later tutored by Christopher Armstrong (d. 1820), school master of the Hawick Parish Church, to help prepare for entry to the University. Although he was only there for a month or two, he resumed teaching at Teviothead before being approached by the Christian Knowledge Society to become a missionary.

As an adult, he travelled to Borough Road, London in 1818 where he trained and worked as a teacher at the British and Foreign School Society. Jenkins' time included teaching in schools at Pimlico and Fitzrovia.

He graduated in January 1821 and travelled to Mauritius as a teacher. By 1823, he was chosen to lead the newly established free Government "Model School" in Port Louis. For the next 37 years he introduced some new teaching methods including singing lessons, and speaking of the creole language.

== Later life ==
He served the remainder of his teaching career in Mauritius and died on 16 June 1859, leaving a widow, Augustine Laurencia Jenkins, and four children.
