= Coldstream Town Hall =

Municipal building in Coldstream, Scotland

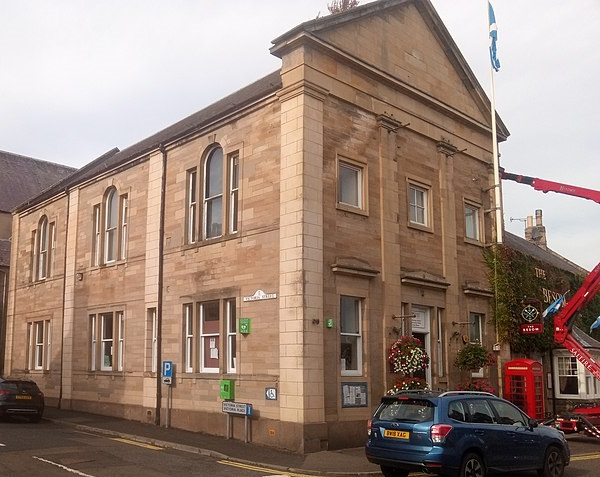
- Coldstream Town Hall

- Shown in the Scottish Borders
- 55.6520°N 2.2510°W
- Location: High Street, Coldstream

History
- Built: 1863

Site notes
- Architect: James Cunningham
- Architectural style: Neoclassical style

Listed Building – Category B
- Official name: Town Hall, 73 High Street, Coldstream
- Designated: 20 October 1983
- Reference no.: LB23072

Coldstream Town Hall is a municipal building in the High Street, Coldstream, Scottish Borders, Scotland. The structure, which currently accommodates a library and a registration office, is a Category B listed building.

== History ==
The building was commissioned by Cospatrick Douglas-Home, 11th Earl of Home as a mechanics' institute and town hall for the town. It was designed by James Cunningham of Greenlaw in the neoclassical style, built in ashlar stone and was completed in 1863. Ownership of the building was initially placed in the hands of the board of trustees of the mechanics' institute which was chaired by the bailie.

The design involved a symmetrical main frontage of three bays facing onto the High Street. The central bay featured a doorway with a rectangular fanlight flanked by two narrow sash windows and surmounted by a cornice. On the ground floor, the outer bays were fenestrated by sash windows with cornices and, on the first floor, all bays were fenestrated by square casement windows with architraves. The bays were flanked by full-height Tuscan order pilasters supporting an entablature and a pediment. The side elevation, facing onto Victoria Street, was fenestrated by tri-partite windows on the ground floor and by Venetian windows on the first floor. Internally, the principal rooms were the mechanics' institute on the ground floor and the council chamber for the burgh council on the first floor.

The educational role of mechanics' institutes became redundant in the late 19th century and the trustees of the mechanics' institute sold the building to the burgh commissioners in December 1884. The building was also used as a community events venue and films were shown in the building until the Eildon Cinema opened in Victoria Street in April 1953. As the responsibilities of the burgh council increased, offices for the town clerk were established two doors away to the southwest, at No. 69 High Street.

The building continued to serve as the meeting place of the burgh council for much of the 20th century but ceased to be the local seat of government when the enlarged Berwickshire District Council was formed in 1975. The building subsequently served as the local public library, as well as the local Registration Office and an approved venue for marriages and civil partnership ceremonies. Works of art in the town hall include a portrait of George Monck, 1st Duke of Albemarle.

== See also ==
- List of listed buildings in Coldstream, Scottish Borders
