= Knoll Hospital =

- NHS Borders
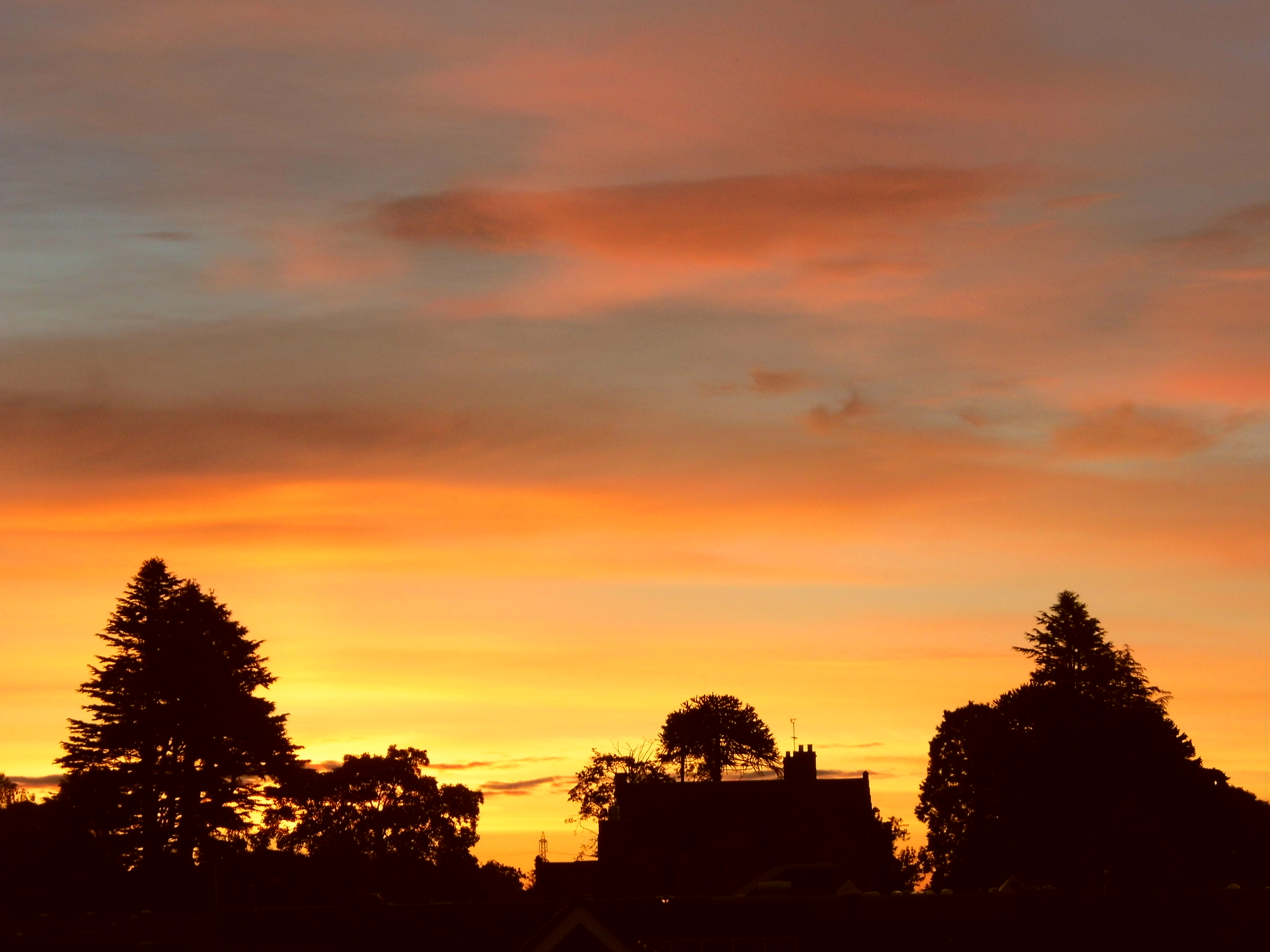
- Knoll Hospital

- Shown in Scottish Borders

Geography
- Location: Station Road, Duns, Scotland
- Coordinates: 55.7725°N 2.3412°W

Organisation
- Care system: NHS Scotland
- Type: General

Services
- Emergency department: No

History
- Founded: 1938

Links
- Lists: Hospitals in Scotland

Knoll Hospital is a health facility at Station Road in Duns, Scotland. It is managed by NHS Borders. It is a Category B listed building.

== History ==
The hospital was established with the conversion of a late 19th century mansion to create a maternity hospital in 1938. It joined the National Health Service as Knoll Maternity Hospital in 1948. After a local medical practice withdrew support, the capacity of the hospital was reduced from 23 beds to 18 beds in August 2013.
