= Hawick =

Town in the Scottish Borders

Coordinates: 55.422°N 2.787°W

Hawick: Scottish Gaelic: Hamhaig; Scots: Haaick
- Town and former burgh
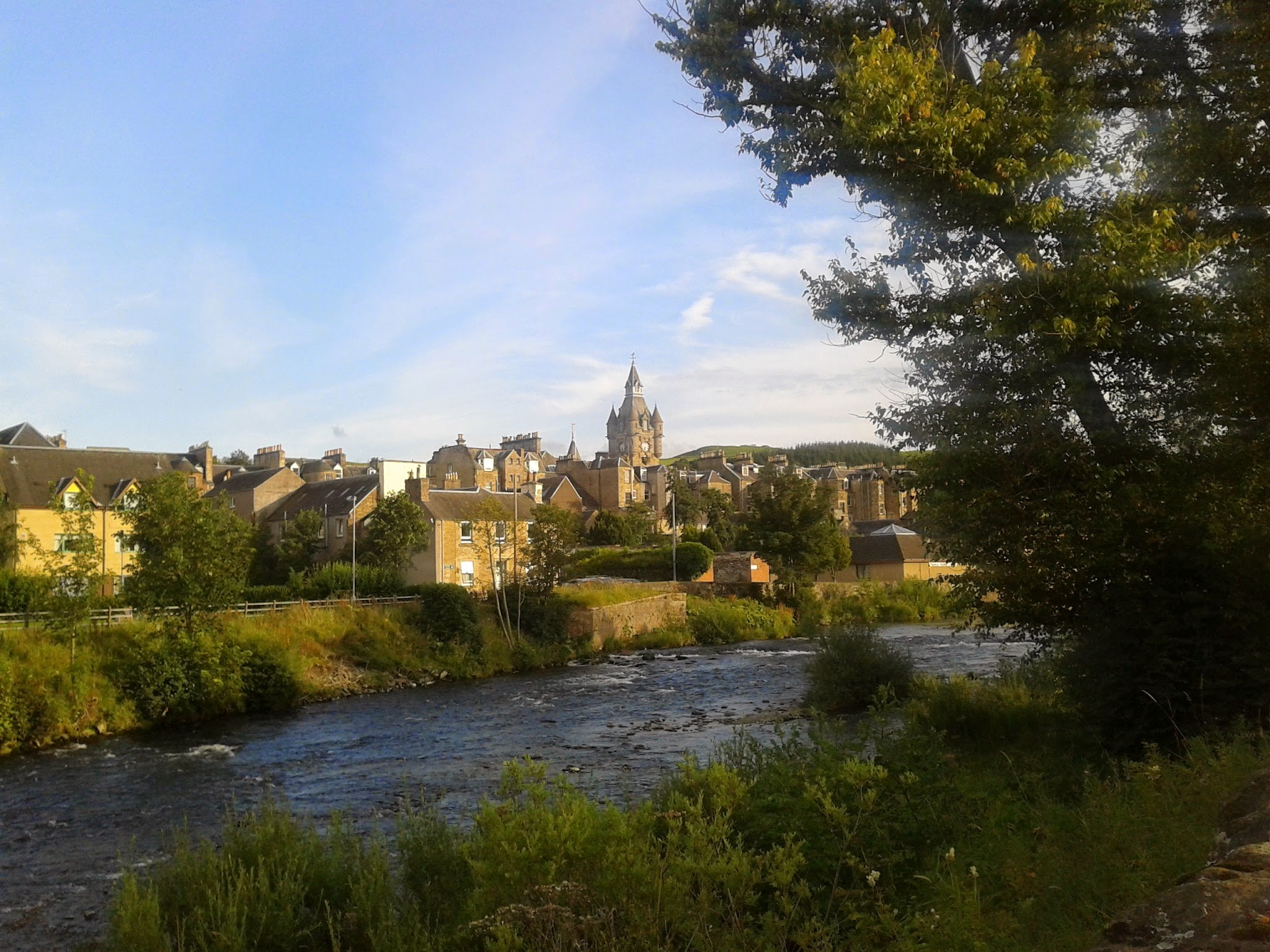
- The River Teviot running through Hawick, with the town hall visible

- Location within the Scottish Borders
- Area: 1.9 sq mi (4.9 km^{2})
- Population: 13,512 (2022)
  - Density: 7,112/sq mi (2,746/km^{2})
- Language: English; Southern Scots
- OS grid reference: NT505155
  - Edinburgh: 39.7 mi (63.9 km) NNW
  - London: 292 mi (470 km) SSE
- Community council: Hawick; Burnfoot
- Council area: Scottish Borders
- Lieutenancy area: Roxburgh, Ettrick and Lauderdale
- Country: Scotland
- Sovereign state: United Kingdom
- Post town: HAWICK
- Postcode district: TD9
- Dialling code: 01450
- Police: Scotland
- Fire: Scottish
- Ambulance: Scottish
- UK Parliament: Berwickshire, Roxburgh and Selkirk
- Scottish Parliament: Ettrick, Roxburgh and Berwickshire
- Website: scotborders.gov.uk

Hawick (/hɔɪk/ HOYK; Scots: Haaick; Scottish Gaelic: Hamhaig) is a market town in the Scottish Borders council area and historic county of Roxburghshire in the east Southern Uplands of Scotland. It is 10 miles (16.1 km) south-west of Jedburgh and 8.9 miles (14.3 km) south-south-east of Selkirk. It is one of the furthest towns from the sea in Scotland, in the heart of Teviotdale, and is the biggest town in Roxburghshire. The town is at the confluence of the Slitrig Water with the River Teviot. It had a population of 13,512 in 2022.

The town was formally established in the 16th century, but was previously the site of historic settlement going back hundreds of years. By the late 17th century, the town began to grow significantly, especially during the Industrial Revolution and Victorian era as a centre for the production of textiles, with a focus on knitting and weaving, involving materials such as tweed and cashmere. By the late 20th century, textile production had declined but the town remains an important regional centre for shopping, tourism and services. Hawick's architecture is distinctive in that it has many sandstone buildings with slate roofs. The town has several museums, parks and heritage sites. The town hosts the annual Alchemy Film and Moving Image Festival.

== History ==
The name Hawick is Old English in origin, first recorded in 1167 and translates as "enclosed farm" or "enclosed hamlet". The origin of the name of Hawick was first researched in the 1860s by James Murray, a local teacher and later the primary editor of the Oxford English Dictionary. The town has a long history of habitation being settled at the confluence of Slitrig Water and the River Teviot. The west end of the town contains "the Motte", the remains of a likely 12th century Scoto-Norman motte-and-bailey castle.

On 20 June 1342, as Alexander Ramsay of Dalhousie according to the duty of his office as Sheriff of Teviotsdale was holding court in the church of Hawick, William Douglas, Lord of Liddesdale came with an armed retinue and entered the church. He was courteously welcomed. Douglas and his men attacked Ramsay and dragged him bleeding and in chains to Hermitage Castle; It is generally assumed because Douglas believed he should be Sheriff of Teviotdale. There Ramsay was imprisoned in a dungeon where he died of starvation.

The origin of Hawick being formally declared a town are said to originate with the Battle of Hornshole which was fought in 1514 between an English raiding party and young locals from Hawick. In 2014, on the 500th anniversary of the battle, some 1,800 children dressed in period costumes re-enacted the battle. The oldest official document of the town is a deed dated 11 October 1537 in which the town was re-declared a free burgh since time immemorial.

Population
Year	Pop.	±%
1971	17,251	—
1991	15,704	−9.0%
2001	14,573	−7.2%
2011	14,294	−1.9%
2016	13,730	−3.9%
2020	13,610	−0.9%
2021	13,586	−0.2%
2022	13,512	−0.5%

St Mary's and Old Parish Church is the oldest church in the town, being constructed in 1764 on the site of an earlier 13th century church. The church was extensively damaged by fire in the late 19th century but was reconstructed in a similar style. The cemetery contains 17th and 18th century gravestones, as well as an elaborate ironwork memorial gate given by the town council.

Hawick developed in the late 18th and 19th centuries as an important town in the manufacture of textiles and knitwear. The first knitting machines were brought to Hawick in 1771 by John Hardie, building on an existing carpet manufacturing trade and with a view to expanding into the production of stockings. As a result of a decline in the stocking trade by 1815, some weaving manufacturers had set up in the town using resources from the stocking trade. These industries continued to grow in size, when in the early 1830s, the term "Tweed" originated from the town as a result of a miscommunication of twill for the River Tweed. The town subsequently focused on the manufacturer of different textiles, hosiery and knitwear, including cashmere, adapting to different patterns and materials as fashions changed. In the 1930s, over 1200 people were employed in producing knitwear in the town. However, by the late 20th century, changing production methods, costs and tastes resulted in the decline of the textile industries to all but a few small businesses.

July 2020 saw the start of work on a £92m flood-defence scheme. But in October 2021, with engineering work still in progress, the town was severely affected by heavy rainfall and subsequent flooding.

== Governance ==
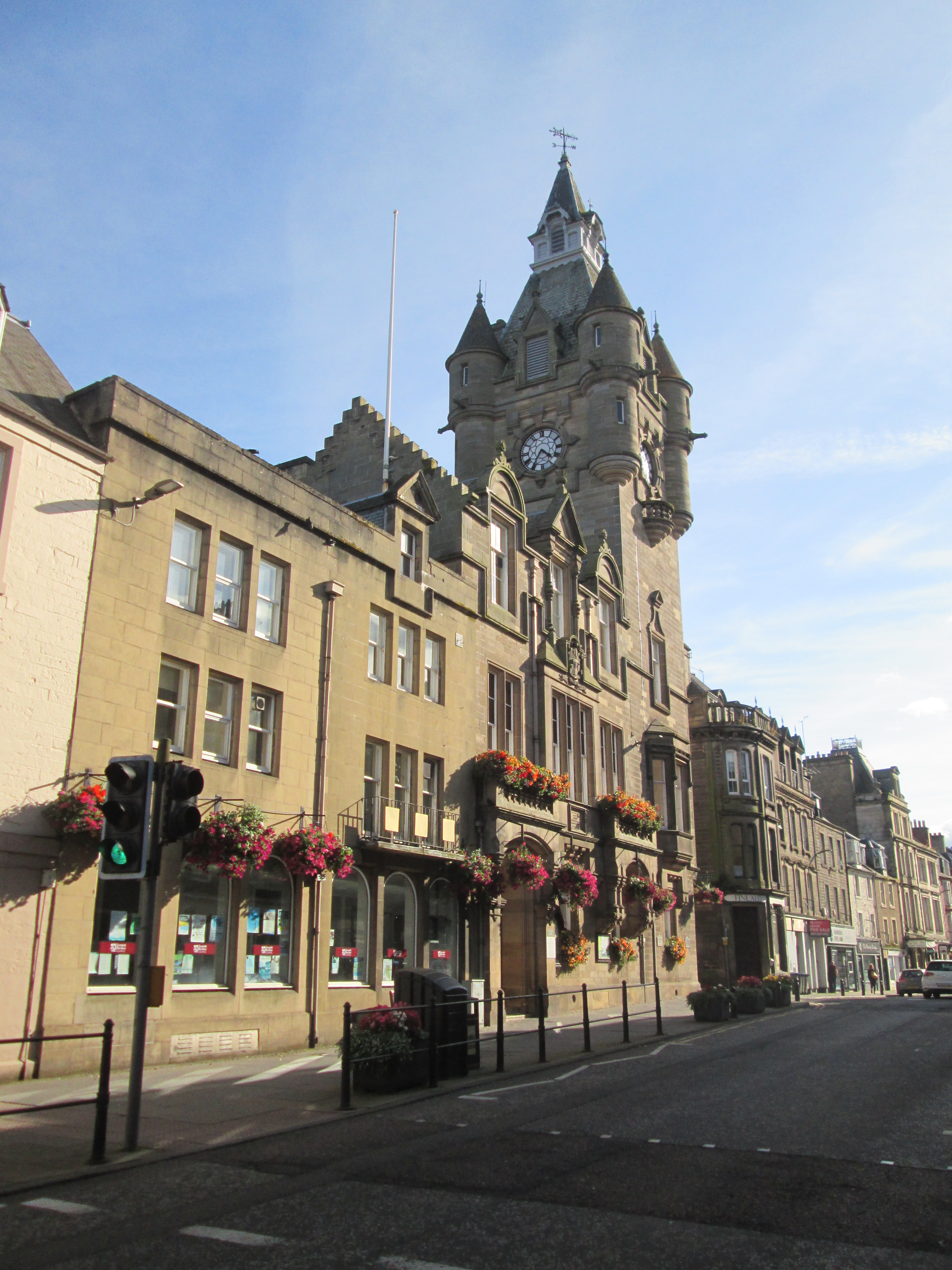
Hawick Town Hall, High Street

Local government services for Hawick are provided by Scottish Borders Council. There is also a community council covering the town.

Hawick was designated a burgh of regality in 1669 and became a police burgh in 1868. Hawick Town Hall on the High Street was built in 1886, designed by James Campbell Walker in the Scottish baronial style.

When elected county councils were created in 1890 under the Local Government (Scotland) Act 1889, the burgh of Hawick was deemed capable of running its own affairs and so was excluded from the jurisdiction of Roxburghshire County Council. Further local government reform in 1930 brought the burgh of Hawick within the area controlled by the county council, with the town being reclassified as a small burgh, ceding most of its functions to the county council.

In 1975 local government across Scotland was reformed under the Local Government (Scotland) Act 1973. The burghs and counties were abolished as administrative areas, replaced with a two-tier system of upper-tier regions and lower-tier districts. Hawick therefore became part of the Roxburgh district within the Borders region. Roxburgh District Council used Hawick Town Hall as its headquarters. Further local government reform in 1996 abolished the regions and districts, since when Hawick has been administered by Scottish Borders Council.

== Economy ==
The companies William Lockie, Hawico, Hawick Knitwear, Johnstons of Elgin, Lyle & Scott, Peter Scott, Pringle of Scotland, and Scott & Charters, have had and in many cases still have manufacturing plants in Hawick, producing luxury cashmere and merino wool knitwear. Engineering firm Turnbull and Scott had their headquarters in an Elizabethan-style listed building on Commercial Road before moving to Burnfoot.

In recent times, unemployment has been an issue in Hawick. The rate of unemployment exceeded the average for the Scottish Borders between 2014 and 2017. The closure of once-significant employers, including mills like Peter Scott's and Pringle's have reduced the number of jobs in the town. The population has declined partly because of this; at 13,730 in 2016, it was at its lowest since the 1800s. Despite efforts to improve the economic situation, unemployment and poverty remain relatively high, with the number of children living in poverty in the town one-tenth higher than the average for the Borders region in 2017. Developments such as a new business centre, which opened in 2024, an Aldi supermarket, and distillery, which opened in 2018–19, have benefitted Hawick. Despite this, continued business closures, for example that of Homebase and the Original Factory Store in 2018, suggest continued economic decline for the town.

== Transport ==
Hawick lies in the centre of the valley of the Teviot. The A7 Edinburgh–Carlisle road passes through the town, with main roads also leading to Berwick-upon-Tweed (the A698) and Newcastle upon Tyne (the A6088, which joins the A68 at the Carter Bar, 16 miles (26 km) south-east of Hawick).

The town lost its rail service in 1969, when, as part of the Beeching Axe, the Waverley Route from Carlisle to Edinburgh via Hawick railway station was closed. It was then said to be the farthest large town from a railway station in the United Kingdom, but this changed as a result of the opening of the Borders Railway, which, in 2015, reopened part of the former Waverley Route to Tweedbank, near Galashiels. Regular buses serve the railway station at Carlisle, 42 miles (68 km) away. Reconnecting Hawick to the Borders Railway would require reinstatement of a further approximately 17 miles (27 km) of the former Waverley Route from Hawick to Tweedbank station via Hassendean, St Boswells and Melrose, with refurbishment of the four-arch Ale Water viaduct near New Belses. Hawick station was on the north bank of the river Teviot, below Wilton Hill Terrace, with a now demolished viaduct (near the Mart Street bridge) carrying the route south towards Carlisle. Waverley Walk in Hawick is a footpath along the former railway route, north-eastward from the former station site near Teviotdale Leisure Centre. A feasibility study is now underway to evaluate the possible reopening of the southern section of the former Waverley railway to link the Borders Railway terminus at Tweedbank through Hawick to Carlisle.

The nearest major airports are at Edinburgh, 57 miles (92 km) away, and Newcastle, 56 miles (90 km) away.

== Culture and traditions ==
=== Culture ===
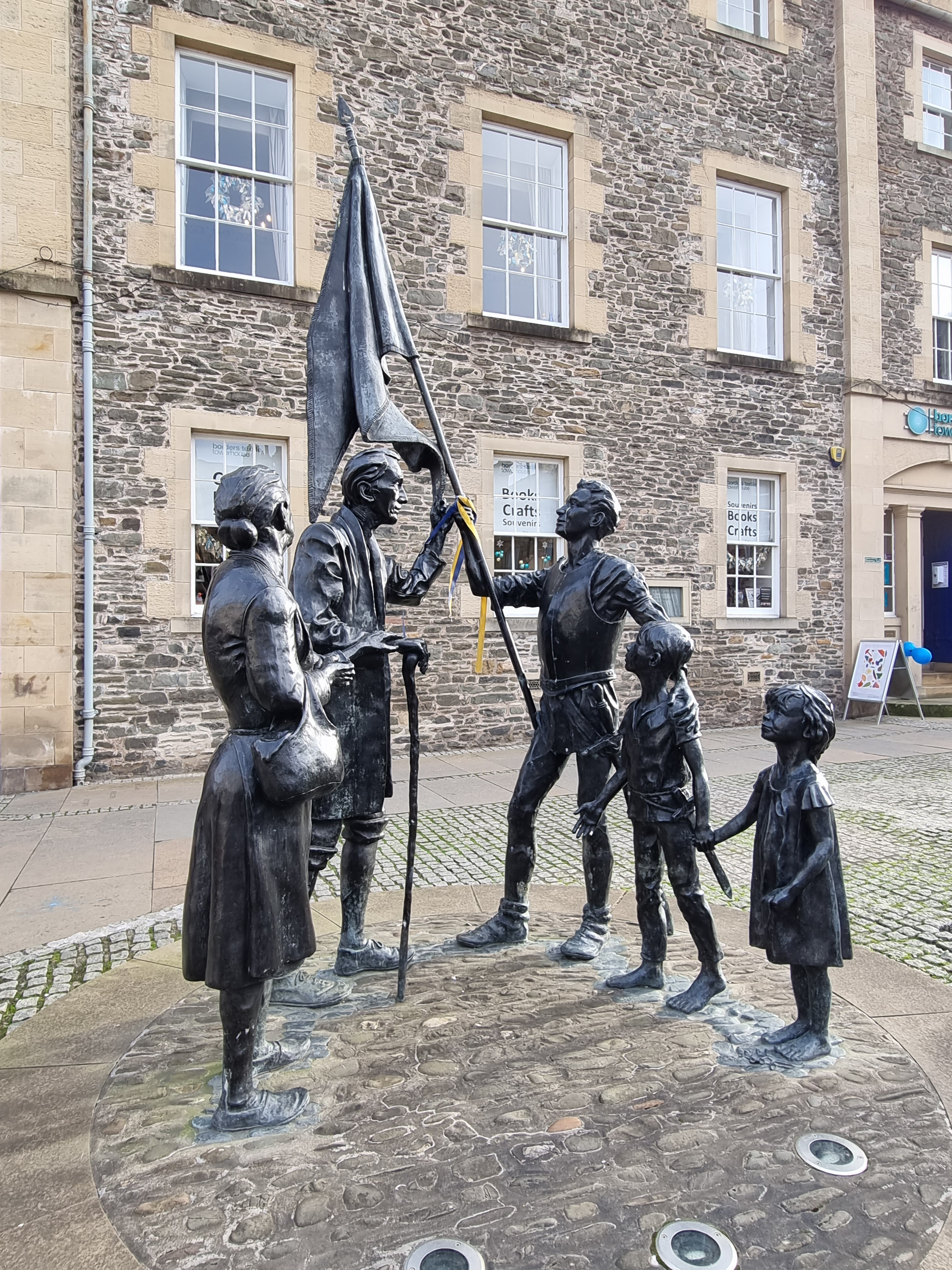
The "Return from Hornshole" statue, erected in 2014 and funded by the Common Riding Committee of the town.

The town hosts the annual Common Riding, which combines the annual riding of the boundaries of the town's common land with the commemoration of a victory of local youths over an English raiding party in 1514. In March 2007, this was described by the Rough Guide publication World Party as one of the best parties in the world.

People from Hawick call themselves "Teries", after a traditional song which includes the line "Teribus ye teri odin".

Hawick and surrounding border residents are known to possess a dialect and accent slightly different from broader Scots, being classed as Southern Scots or Borders Scots. For example, the term a "Hawick Gill" is a large measure of spirits, equivalent to 0.28 litre (half a pint).

=== Monuments ===
Hawick High Street has an equestrian statue at the east end, known as "the Horse", erected in 1914. Drumlanrig's Tower, now a museum, dates largely from the mid-16th century.

In 2009 another monument the Turning of the Bull (artist, Angela Hunter, Innerleithen) was unveiled in Hawick. This monument depicts William Rule turning the wild bull as it was charging King Robert the Bruce, thus saving the king's life and beginning the Scottish Clan of Turnbull. A poem written by John Leyden commemorates this historical event. "His arms robust the hardy hunter flung around his bending horns, and upward wrung, with writhing force his neck retorted round, and rolled the panting monster to the ground, crushed, with enormous strength, his bony skull; and courtiers hailed the man who turned the bull."

=== Media and film ===
Local news and television programmes are provided by BBC Scotland and ITV Border. Television signals are received from the Selkirk TV transmitter and the local relay transmitter. Local radio stations are BBC Radio Scotland on 93.5 FM, Greatest Hits Radio Scottish Borders and North Northumberland on 96.8 FM and TD9 Radio, an online community based station which broadcast from the town. The town is served by its own local newspaper, The Hawick Paper. Other newspapers that cover the town are The Border Telegraph and Southern Reporter.

Hawick is home to Alchemy Film & Arts, and its internationally renowned flagship annual event Alchemy Film and Moving Image Festival. Investing in film "as a means of generating discussion, strengthening community, and stimulating creative thought", Alchemy works with artists and communities within Hawick and the Scottish Borders on a year-round basis. In summer 2019, Alchemy launched its award-winning Film Town project, which "aims to work to the benefit of Hawick and its unique communities by widening accessibility and inclusion for audiences, participants and partners, and by challenging social, physical and communication barriers... while contributing to Hawick's economic regeneration through an investment in its cultural identity".

In response to the COVID-19 pandemic, Alchemy delivered the tenth and eleventh editions of its annual film festival as livestream events delivered from Hawick, and assisted in helping the town's communities to digitise their own services, including the production of virtual lectures for the town's 164-year-old Hawick Archaeological Society.

=== Sports ===
The town is the home of Hawick Rugby Football Club which was founded in 1873. The town has a senior football team, Hawick Royal Albert, who currently play in the East of Scotland Football League.

The Hawick baw game was once played here by the "uppies" and the "doonies" on the first Monday after the new moon in the month of February. The river of the town formed an important part of the pitch. Although no longer played at Hawick, it is still played at nearby Jedburgh.

=== Confectionery ===
Hawick balls or baws, also known as Hills Balls or taffy rock bools, are a peppermint-flavoured boiled sweet that originated in the town. They are particularly associated with rugby commentator Bill McLaren who was known to offer them from a bag that he always carried. They are now produced in Greenock.

== Education and services ==
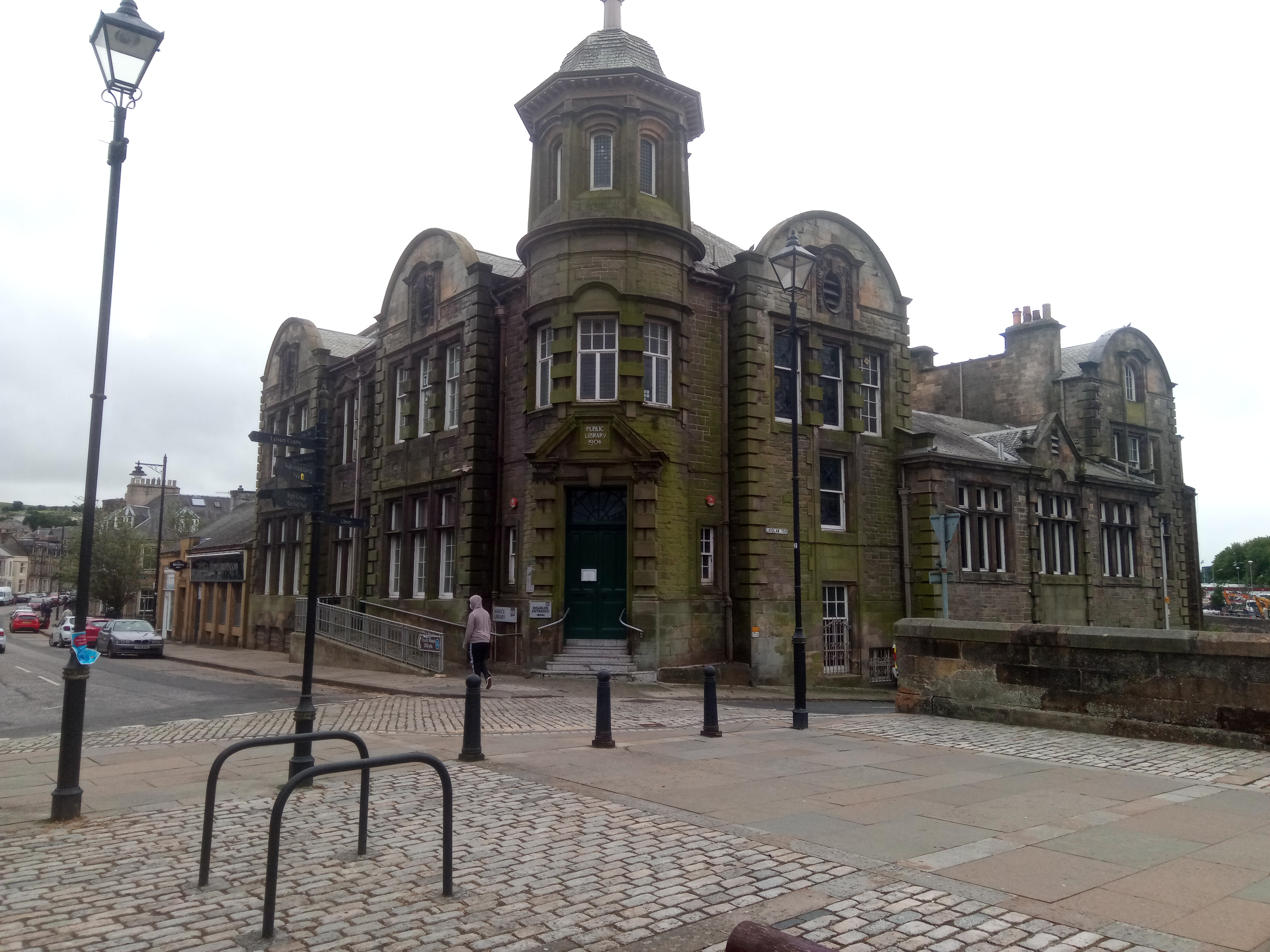
Hawick Library, a Carnegie library, built 1904.

Hawick Library is a Carnegie funded library that opened in 1904.

Teviotdale Leisure Centre is the local public fitness centre, with a gym, children's soft-play area and swimming pool. The previous public baths, now disused were built in 1913 on Commercial Road and closed in the 1980s.

The Borders Textile Towerhouse is a local museum focusing on the history of textiles in Hawick and the Borders area. Examples of temporary exhibitions held include an exhibit on fashion designer Bernat Klein and a history of shops in the town. The museum occupies a restored heritage building, formerly a hotel and inn which incorporates Drumlanrig Tower, a 16th-century fortified tower.

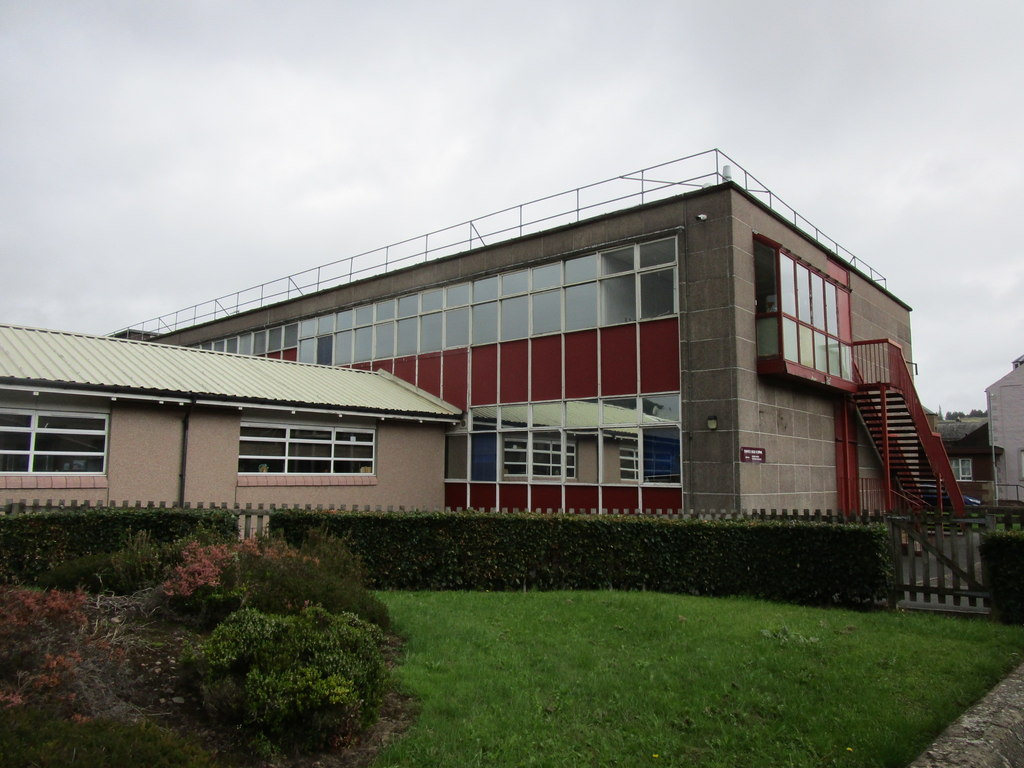
Hawick High School

Wilton Lodge Park is a large public park in the south-west of the town. The park is home to Hawick Museum, a public museum focusing on art and local history. The museum includes local artwork, some of which was produced by members of Hawick Art Club.

The Borders Abbeys Way passes through Hawick. A statue of the popular rugby commentator Bill McLaren (1923–2010) is in Wilton Lodge Park, to the west of the town centre. In October 2021, the local council began construction of a new £2m footbridge to link local communities, as part of a broader improvements in the town to create an improved travel network in Hawick, alongside a new flood protection scheme.

Hawick Community Hospital is the local hospital for the area, itself replacing Hawick Cottage Hospital in 2005.

Hawick High School is a non-denominational secondary school in the town. In September 2021, it was announced that a new circa £49 million will be built to replace the current school on its existing site by 2027. Hawick High School is part of the Hawick cluster of schools including Burnfoot Community School, Denholm Primary School (in the Village of Denholm), Drumlanrig St Cuthberts Primary School, Newcastleton Primary School (in the village of Newcastleton), Stirches Primary School, Trinity Primary School and Wilton Primary School.

== Town twinning ==
Hawick is twinned with:

- Bailleul, Nord, France.

== Notable people ==
=== Arts ===
- Dame Isobel Baillie (1895–1983), singer
- Brian Balfour-Oatts (born 1966), art dealer
- Brian Bonsor (1926–2011), composer
- Andrew Cranston (born 1969), artist
- William Landles (1923–2016), artist
- Sir John Blackwood McEwen, composer
- Peter McRobbie (born 1943), actor
- Will H. Ogilvie (1869–1963), Border poet
- Anne Redpath (1895–1965), artist
- John Renbourn (1944–2015), musician
- Henry Scott Riddell (1798–1870), writer
- Francis George Scott (1880–1958), composer
- Douglas Veitch (born 1960), musician

=== Journalism ===
- Bill McLaren (1923–2010), sports journalist

=== Science ===
- James Paris Lee (1831–1904), arms designer
- Sir Andrew Smith (1797–1872), zoologist
- Sir David Wallace (born 1945), physicist

=== Sports ===
- Sir Chay Blyth (born 1940), yachtsman
- Stuart Easton (born 1983), motorcycle racer
- Darcy Graham (born 1997), rugby player
- Jimmie Guthrie (1897–1937), motorcycle racer
- Steve Hislop (1962–2003), motorcycle racer
- Jason Hart, 2020s flat jockey
- Stuart Hogg (born 1992), rugby player
- Matt Leyden (1904–1975), ice hockey executive
- Robert Lindsay-Watson (1886–1956), athlete
- Jim Renwick (born 1952), rugby player
- Lana Skeldon (born 1993), rugby player
- Tony Stanger (born 1968), rugby player
- James Storrie (1885–1951), cricket player
- Walter Storrie (1875–1945), cricket player
- Dave Valentine (1926–1976), rugby player
- Rory Sutherland (born 1992), rugby player
- Lisa Thomson (born 1997), rugby player

=== Politics and public life ===
- John Daykins (1883–1933), Victoria Cross and Military Medal decorated British Army sergeant of World War I
- Helen Wilson Fell was born here in 1849 and became a leading suffragist and philanthropist in Sydney
- Nigel Griffiths (born 1955), politician
- Tom Jenkins (1797–1859) the United Kingdom's first black schoolteacher
- Alison Suttie, Baroness Suttie (born 1968), politician
- Francis Walsingham (1577–1647), English Jesuit priest, who assumed the name John Fennell
- James Wilson (1805–1860), businessman and politician

=== Business ===
- John Inglis (1823–1898), Hawick-born and raised Canadian manufacturer of engines and consumer products
- James Alison (1862–1932), Dalkeith (Eskbank) born architect practising in Hawick

== See also ==
- List of places in the Scottish Borders
- List of places in Scotland
- Stirches
- Wilton Dean
