= NHS Borders =

Health board for the Scottish Borders region

- Type: NHS board
- Established: 2004
- Headquarters: Borders General Hospital; Melrose; TD6 9BS
- Region served: Scottish Borders
- Area size: 4,732 square kilometres
- Population: 110,200
- Hospitals: Borders General Hospital; Hawick Community Hospital; Hay Lodge Hospital; Kelso Hospital; Knoll Hospital
- Staff: 2,627 (2018/19)
- Website: www.nhsborders.scot.nhs.uk

NHS Borders is one of the fourteen health boards within NHS Scotland. It provides healthcare services for the Scottish Borders, the south east region of Scotland. NHS Borders is headquartered in Melrose.

== History ==
In February 2015 it announced a review of its services. A petition against any move to shut hospital sites in Peebles, Duns, Hawick and Kelso gathered more than 4,000 signatures of support though no proposals to close any have yet appeared.

The board's Pharmacy Team won the Hospital Pharmacy Team of the Year Award at the 2017 Scottish Pharmacist Awards.

During the months of April - June 2021, NHS Borders outperformed the national average in their cancer waiting times, with almost 92% of urgent cancer suspicion referrals being seen within the Scottish Government's 62-day target and 100% of cancer patients beginning their treatment within the 31-day target.

In August 2021, NHS Borders performance dipped to the lowest level for the adherence to the national A&E 4 hour timeframe for admission, transferral or discharge of patients, as it was recorded with a mere 67.7%, being below the national average.

== Hospital Services ==
NHS Borders provides both acute and community care within the Scottish Borders, with the main acute site offer bed capacity for approximately 330 patients.

=== Borders General Hospital ===
The Borders General Hospital is NHS Border's acute hospital, located in near Melrose in the Scottish Borders. Known locally as the "BGH", The Borders General Hospital offers a range of acute inpatient services, including a Departement for Medicine of the Elderly, pre/peri/post natal services and a Stroke Unit. The BGH has a bed capacity of 328. A 24-hour Accident and Emergency Service is offered within the BGH.

=== Hawick Community Hospital ===
Hawick Community Hospital offers a range of services to the Hawick Community. Within the hospital, there are 23 inpatient beds, for step down and rehabilitation care; a day unit, offering care for older patients with dementia and mental health conditions. Hawick Community Hospital also offers a 24-hour Minor Injuries Unit.

=== Hay Lodge Hospital ===
Hay Lodge Hospital is located in the Border town of Peebles. The hospital has a 23 bedded inpatient unit, along with a 24-hour minor injuries unit, GP Treatment Rooms and consultant led clinics in a range of clinical specialties.

=== Kelso Community Hospital ===
Kelso Community Hospital in Kelso is a 23-bedded unit offering care to patients requiring rehabilitation, assessment and palliative care.

=== Knoll Hospital ===
Knoll Hospital is located in the border town of Duns. The hospital has a 23 bedded inpatient unit, along with a 24-hour minor injuries unit, GP Treatment Rooms and consultant led clinics in a range of clinical specialties.

== Mental Health Services ==
=== Cauldshiels Ward ===
The Cauldshiels Ward is a 14 bedded unit which cares for older adults with dementia who are acutely ill or have had crisis due to their condition. Cauldshiels is a community site, located within the grounds of the Borders General Hospital.

=== Melburn Lodge ===
Melburn Lodge is a 16 bedded unit providing care for dementia patients displaying symptoms of stress and distress. Melburn Lodge is a community site, located within the grounds of the Borders General Hospital.

== Former hospitals ==
Former hospitals include Coldstream Cottage Hospital.
