= James Storrie =

Scottish cricketer

Personal information
- Full name: James Storrie
- Born: 7 February 1885; Hawick, Roxburghshire, Scotland
- Died: 23 July 1951 (aged 66); Hawick, Roxburghshire, Scotland
- Batting: Right-handed
- Bowling: Right-arm off break
- Relatives: Walter Storrie (brother)

Domestic team information
- Years: Team
- 1911: Scotland

Career statistics
Competition	First-class
Matches	2
Runs scored	53
Batting average	17.66
100s/50s	–/–
Top score	26
Balls bowled	216
Wickets	1
Bowling average	86.00
5 wickets in innings	–
10 wickets in match	–
Best bowling	1/10
Catches/stumpings	–/–
- Source: Cricinfo, 24 October 2022

James Storrie (7 February 1885 – 23 July 1951) was a Scottish first-class cricketer.

== Early life and career ==
Storrie was born at Hawick in February 1885. A club cricketer for Hawick and Wilton, he was appointed captain in 1915 and continued to captain the team into the late 1930s, at which point he was over-50 years of age. Storrie had represented Scotland in two first-class cricket matches in 1911, against Ireland at Glasgow and the touring Indians at Galashiels. He scored 53 runs in his two matches, with a highest score of 26, and took a single wicket.

== Death and personal life ==
Considered one of the most outstanding personalities in the history of cricket in Hawick, Storrie died in his home town on 23 July 1951 following a long illness. His brother, Walter, was also a first-class cricketer.
