= Walter Storrie =

Scottish cricketer

Personal information
- Full name: Walter Storrie
- Born: 2 January 1875; Hawick, Roxburghshire, Scotland
- Died: 3 December 1945 (aged 70); Hawick, Roxburghshire, Scotland
- Batting: Right-handed
- Relatives: James Storrie (brother)

Domestic team information
- Years: Team
- 1911: Scotland

Career statistics
Competition	First-class
Matches	1
Runs scored	8
Batting average	4.00
100s/50s	–/–
Top score	8
Catches/stumpings	–/–
- Source: Cricinfo, 31 October 2022

Walter Storrie (2 January 1875 – 3 December 1945) was a Scottish first-class cricketer.

Storrie was born at Hawick in February 1885. A club cricketer for Hawick and Wilton, Storrie was selected to represent Scotland in a single first-class match against Ireland at Glasgow in 1911; also making his first-class debut in this match was his younger brother, James. Batting twice in the match, he was dismissed in the Scottish first innings without scoring by Gus Kelly, while in their second innings he was promoted to open the batting and was dismissed for 8 runs by Bob Lambert. Outside of cricket, he was a cashier for Messrs Peter Scott & Co., hosiery manufacturers. Storrie died at Hawick in December 1945.
