= Coldstream =

Town and civil parish in Scotland

Coordinates: 55.65°N 2.25°W

Coldstream: Scottish Gaelic: An Sruthan Fuar
- Coldstream Town Hall

- Location within the Scottish Borders
- Population: 2,080 (2022)
- OS grid reference: NT841398
  - Edinburgh: 42 miles (68 km) NW
  - London: 299 miles (481 km) SSE
- Civil parish: Coldstream
- Council area: Scottish Borders
- Lieutenancy area: Berwickshire
- Country: Scotland
- Sovereign state: United Kingdom
- Post town: COLDSTREAM
- Postcode district: TD12
- Dialling code: 01890
- Police: Scotland
- Fire: Scottish
- Ambulance: Scottish
- UK Parliament: Berwickshire, Roxburgh and Selkirk
- Scottish Parliament: Ettrick, Roxburgh and Berwickshire
- Website: Coldstream Community Trust

River Tweed flowing over the town.

Coldstream (Scottish Gaelic: An Sruthan Fuar) is a historic town, former burgh and civil parish in the Scottish Borders area of Scotland. It lies on the north bank of the River Tweed in Berwickshire, while Northumberland in England lies to the south bank, with Cornhill-on-Tweed the nearest village. In 2022, the town had a population of 2,080.

Coldstream is the namesake of the Coldstream Guards, a regiment in the British Army, so called because they marched from Coldstream to help restore the British Monarchy in 1660.

== History ==
Coldstream is the location where Edward I of England invaded Scotland in 1296. In February 1316 during the Wars of Scottish Independence, Sir James Douglas defeated a numerically superior force of Gascon soldiery led by Edmond de Caillou at the Skaithmuir to the north of the town. In 1650 General George Monck founded the Coldstream Guards regiment (one of the Foot Guards regiments of the British Army). It is one of two regiments of the Household Division that can trace its lineage to the New Model Army. Monck led the regiment to London, helping to enable the Restoration of King Charles II.

In the 18th and 19th centuries, Coldstream was a popular centre for runaway marriages, much like Gretna Green, as it lay on a major road (now the A697). A monument to Charles Marjoribanks (1794–1833), MP for Berwickshire, whose ancestral home was in nearby Lees, stands at the east end of the town, near the Coldstream Bridge. Alec Douglas-Home (1903–95), who served as Prime Minister of the United Kingdom from October 1963 to October 1964, is buried in the churchyard of the ruined Lennel parish church, just outside the village.

Notable buildings in the town include the marriage house, where weddings were conducted, The Hirsel, which is the family seat of the Earls of Home, and Coldstream Town Hall, which is used as a library and registration office.

Each year, during the first week of August, Coldstream hosts a traditional "Civic Week" where it includes historical aspects of the town's history such as the Torchlight procession and horse-rides to the Battle of Flodden battlefield.

=== Coldstream Priory ===
The Priory of St Mary was founded before 1166 by Gospatric III, Earl of Lothian. Never wealthy or powerful, the monastery nevertheless occurs frequently in the history of the border lands, being targeted several times by English forces. The monastery is the only one from the period where any charters survive thanks to the good sense of the prioress, having them copied. The house was used by both the English and Scots to gather information on each other, thanks to its location, the prioress treading a tightrope to ensure the survival of the monastery. It became a favourite of Margaret Tudor, wife of James IV, Margaret using it several times during the troubled times of the Regency.

After the Battle of Flodden, the prioress had all the bodies of the Scottish casualties (apart from James IV's, which was taken to England) brought to the monastery for burial - an event commemorated annually even today, by a procession & service, involving cutting a sod of grass from the battle field and it being carried back to Coldstream; since the priory is completely lost today, the sod is symbolically 'buried' on the Tweed Green. The last prioress signed away her community and it ceased to exist as a legal entity in 1621, although no new novices had been permitted since the 1560 Reform Parliament. No reliable record of the number of nuns living in the house have survived. Isabella Hoppringle (1460–1538) was the prioress of Coldstream from 1505 until her death. She was succeeded by her relative, Janet Pringle, the last 'real' prioress of the house.

=== Bughtrig House ===
In February 2020, the Scottish Borders Council announced plans to build a museum at the family home of Vice-Admiral Bertram Home Ramsay, who masterminded Operation Dynamo, the evacuation of Dunkirk. "A former garden store will be converted at Bughtrig House in Coldstream to create the museum in his honour," BBC News reported.

== The Ba Green ==
The border between Scotland and England runs down the middle of the River Tweed, however between the villages of Wark and Cornhill the Scottish border comes south of the river to enclose a small riverside meadow of approximately 2 to 3 acres (or about a hectare). This piece of land is known as the Ba Green. It is said locally that every year the men of Coldstream would play the men of Wark (south of the river) at ba, and the winning side would claim the Ba Green for their country. As Coldstream grew to have a larger population than Wark, the men of Coldstream always defeated those of Wark at the game, and so the land became a permanent part of Scotland.

== Media ==
Local news and television programmes are provided by BBC Scotland and ITV Border. Television signals are received from the Selkirk TV transmitter. BBC North East and Cumbria and ITV Tyne Tees can also be received from the Chatton TV transmitter.

Local radio stations are BBC Radio Scotland on 93.5 FM, BBC Radio Newcastle can also be received on 96.0 FM and Greatest Hits Radio Scottish Borders and North Northumberland on 96.8 FM.

The Border Telegraph and Southern Reporter are the town's local newspapers.

== Twin town ==
Coldstream is twinned with:

- Bennecourt, Yvelines, France

== See also ==
- Coldstream Bridge
- Coldstream F.C.
- List of places in the Scottish Borders
- List of places in Scotland
- Coldstream Cottage Hospital
