= Dundee =

City and council area in Scotland

Dundee Dùn Dè (Scottish Gaelic)
- City, lieutenancy and council area
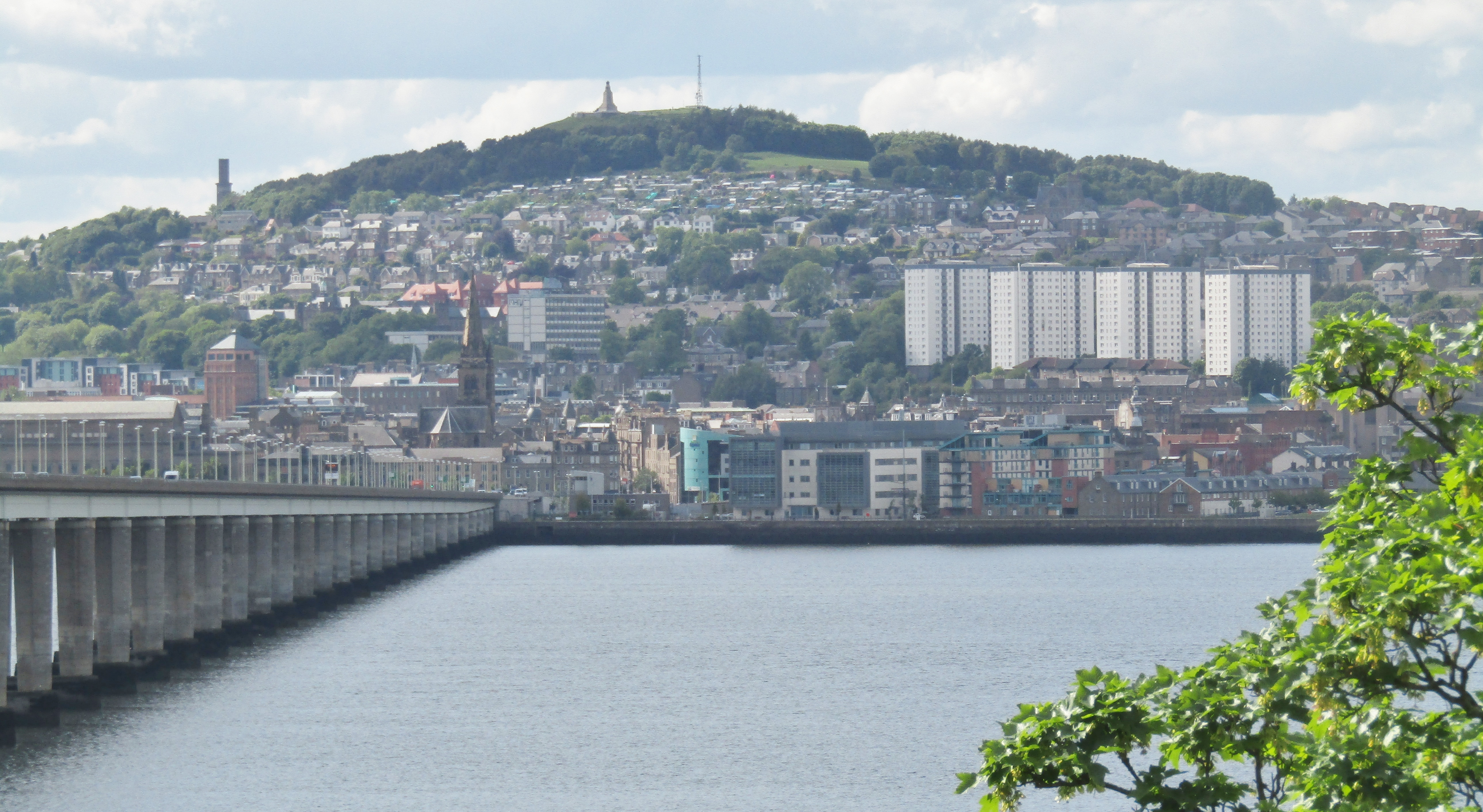
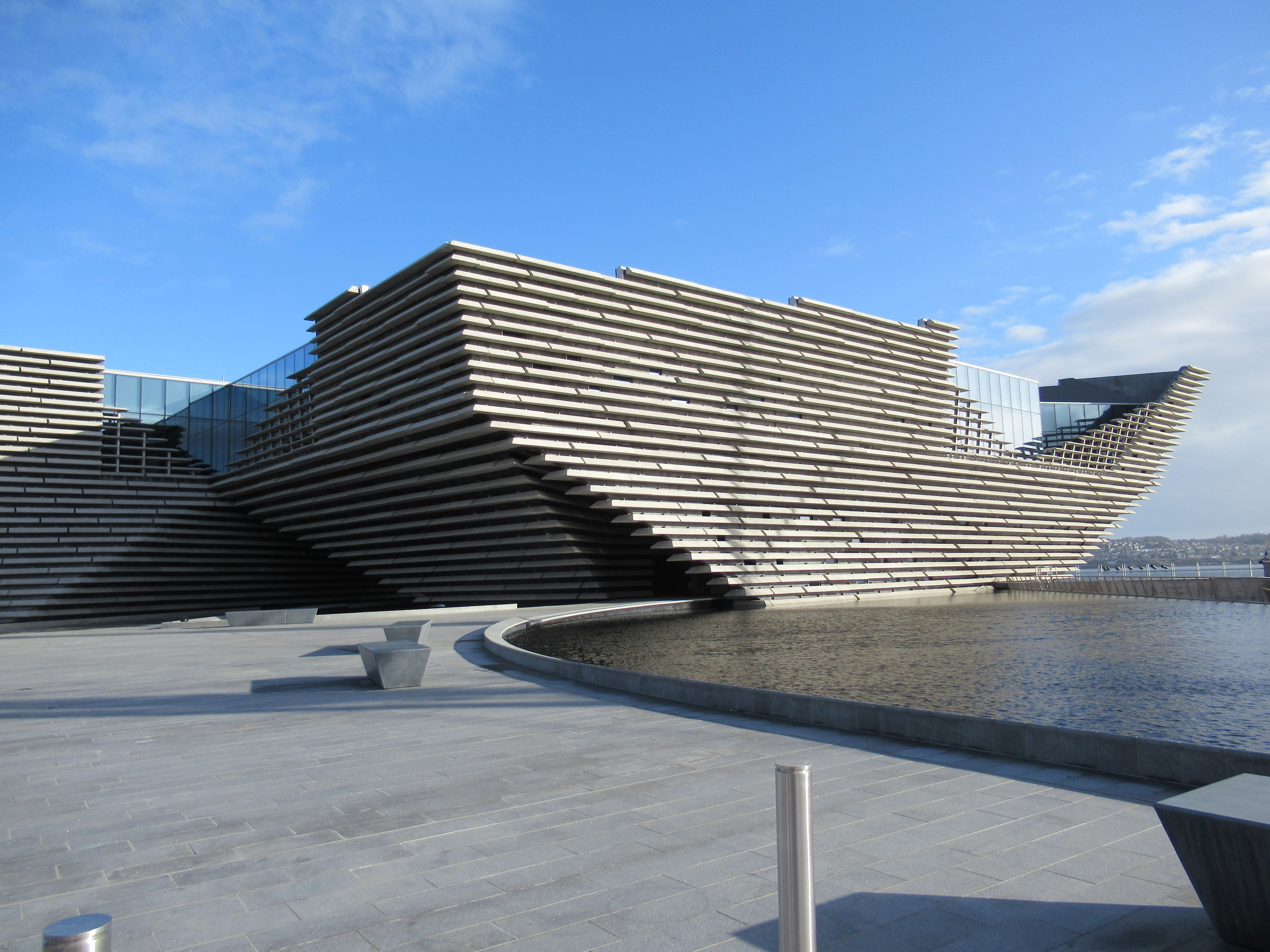
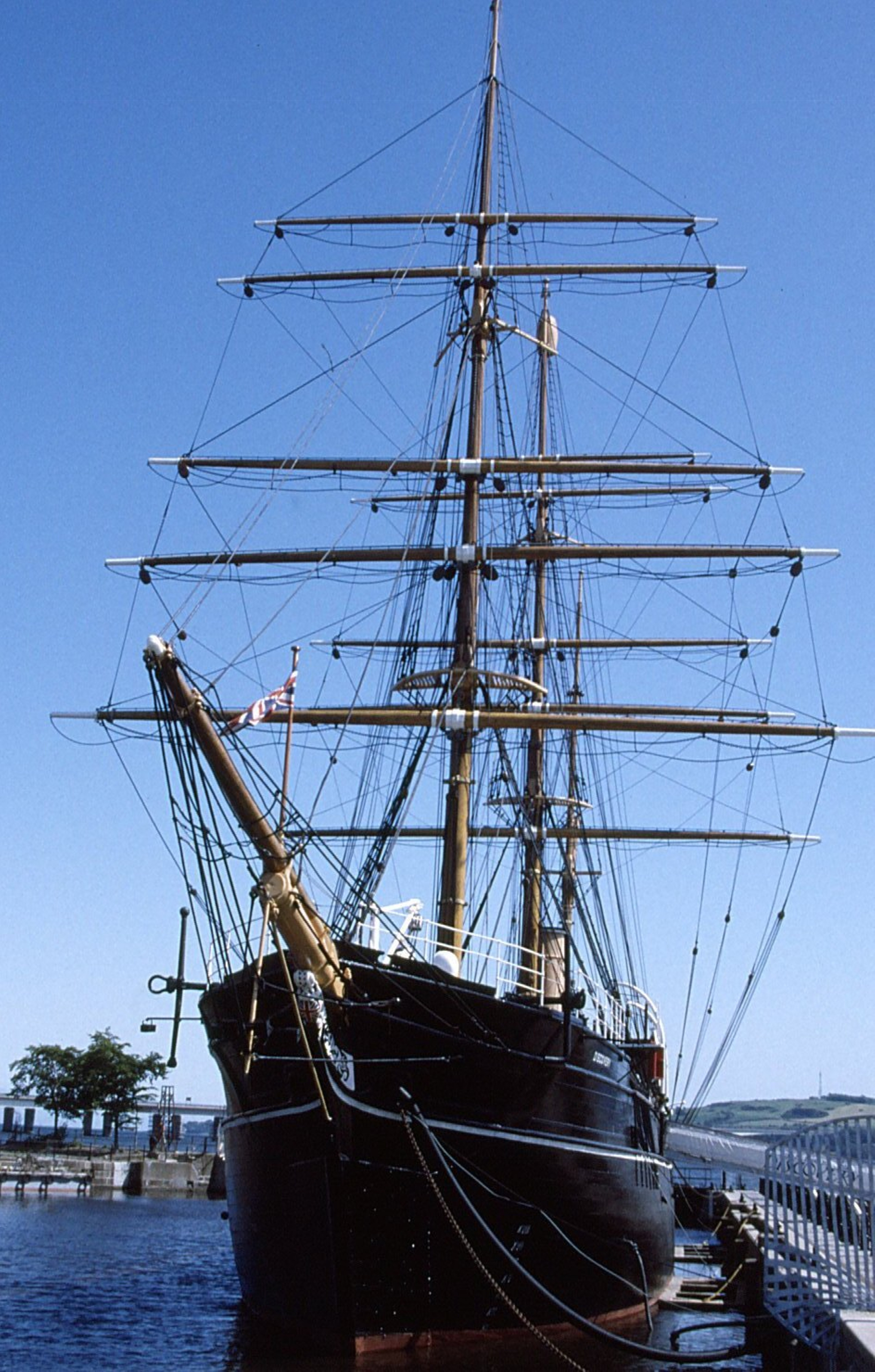
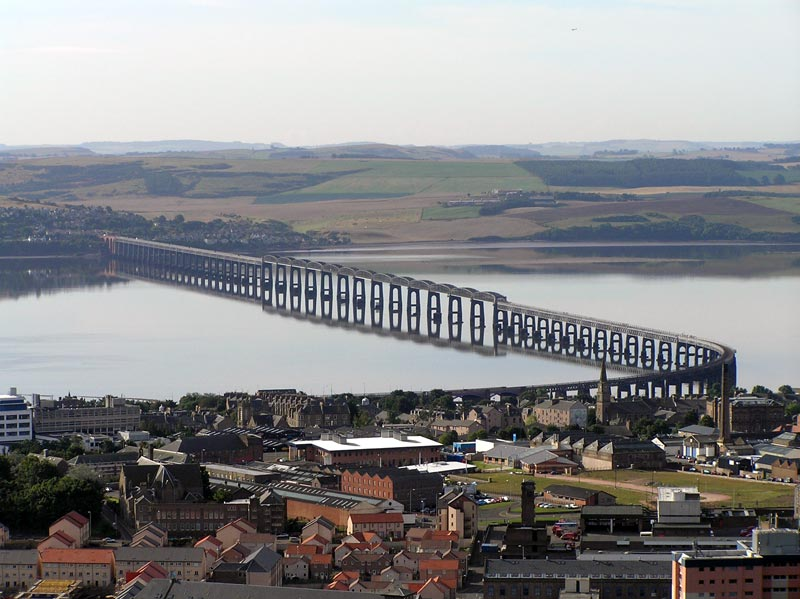
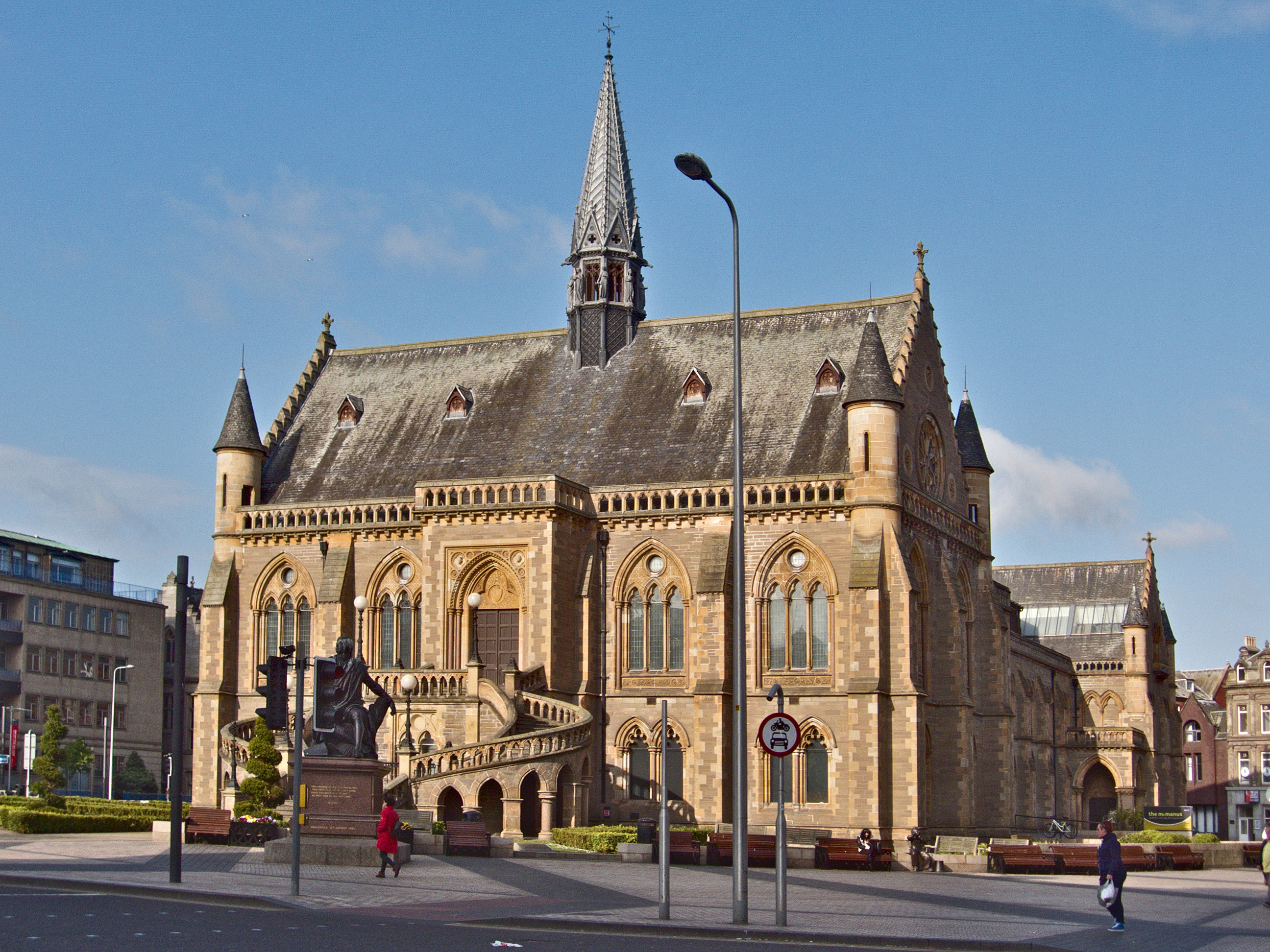
- Skyline of Dundee from Fife V&A Dundee RRS Discovery Tay Bridge The McManus

- Flag Coat of arms
- Etymology: Dùn Dè, originally meaning 'Daig's Fort'
- Dundee shown within Scotland
- Coordinates: 56°27′38″N 2°58′12″W
- Sovereign state: United Kingdom
- Country: Scotland
- Council Area: Dundee City
- Lieutenancy Area: Dundee
- Founded: c. 11th century AD
- Burgh charter: 1191
- City status: 26 January 1889
- Unitary authority: 1 April 1996
- Administrative HQ: Dundee City Chambers

Government
  - Type: Council
  - Body: Dundee City Council
  - Control: Scottish National Party
  - MPs: 2 MPs: Lara Bird (SNP); Chris Law (SNP)
  - MSPs: 2 MSPs: Heather Anderson (SNP); Stephen Gethins (SNP)

Area
  - Total: 23 sq mi (60 km^{2})
  - Rank: 32nd

Population (2025)
  - Total: 148,390
  - Rank: 13th
  - Density: 6,430/sq mi (2,481/km^{2})
- Demonym: Dundonian
- Time zone: UTC+0 (GMT)
  - Summer (DST): UTC+1 (BST)
- Postcode areas: DD1–5
- Dialling codes: 01382
- ISO 3166 code: GB-DND
- GSS code: S12000042
- Website: www.dundeecity.gov.uk

Dundee (Note: /dʌnˈdiː/; Scottish Gaelic: Dùn Dè or Dùn Dèagh, pronounced [t̪un tʲeː]) is the fourth-largest city in Scotland. The 2020 mid-year population estimate for the locality was 148,210. It lies within the eastern central Lowlands on the north bank of the Firth of Tay, which feeds into the North Sea.

Under the name of Dundee City, it forms one of the 32 council areas used for local government in Scotland. Within the boundaries of the historic county of Angus, the city developed into a burgh in the late 12th century and established itself as an important east coast trading port. Rapid expansion was brought on by the Industrial Revolution, particularly in the 19th century when Dundee was the centre of the global jute industry. This, along with its other major industries, gave Dundee its epithet as the city of "jute, jam and journalism".

With the decline of traditional industry, the city has adopted a plan to regenerate and reinvent itself as a cultural centre. In pursuit of this, a £1 billion master plan to regenerate and to reconnect the Waterfront to the city centre started in 2001 and is expected to be completed within a 30-year period. The V&A Dundee – the first branch of the V&A to operate outside of London – is the main centrepiece of the waterfront project. Today, Dundee is promoted as "One City, Many Discoveries" in honour of Dundee's history of scientific activities and of the RRS Discovery, Robert Falcon Scott's Antarctic exploration vessel, which was built in Dundee and is now berthed at Discovery Point.

Dundee is an international research and development hub in technology, medicine and life sciences, with technological industries having arrived since the 1980s. Dundee was named as a "City of the Future" by Cognizant in 2021, the only UK city to be featured. Dundee is also a leading city in AI, cybersecurity, fintech and electric vehicles where the city has one of the largest fleets of electric vehicles in the country. The city was named as the electric vehicle capital of Europe in 2018, and it has continuously been branded as the electric vehicle capital of Scotland and the United Kingdom.

In 2014, Dundee was recognised by the United Nations as the UK's first UNESCO City of Design for its diverse contributions to fields including medical research, comics and video games. Since 2015, Dundee's international profile has risen. GQ magazine named Dundee the "Coolest Little City in Britain" in 2015 and The Wall Street Journal ranked Dundee at number 5 on its "Worldwide Hot Destinations" list for 2018.

== Etymology ==
The name "Dundee" is made up of two parts: the common Celtic place-name element dun, meaning 'fort'; and a second part that may be the genitive of a personal name Daig, which in turn derives from an old Celtic element meaning 'fire'. The Latin soubriquet Dei donum ('Gift of God') is a learned pun with no relevance for the etymology. The usual medieval Latin form was Taodunum.

== History ==
=== Early history ===
While earlier evidence for human occupation is abundant, Dundee's success and growth as a seaport town arguably came as a result of William the Lion's charter, granting Dundee to his younger brother, David (later Earl of Huntingdon), in the late 12th century. The situation of the town and its promotion by Earl David as a trading centre led to a period of prosperity and growth. The earldom was passed down to David's descendants, amongst whom was John Balliol. The town became a Royal Burgh on John's coronation as king in 1292. The town and its castle were occupied by English forces for several years during the First War of Independence and recaptured by Robert the Bruce in early 1312. The original burghal charters were lost during the occupation and subsequently renewed by Bruce in 1327.

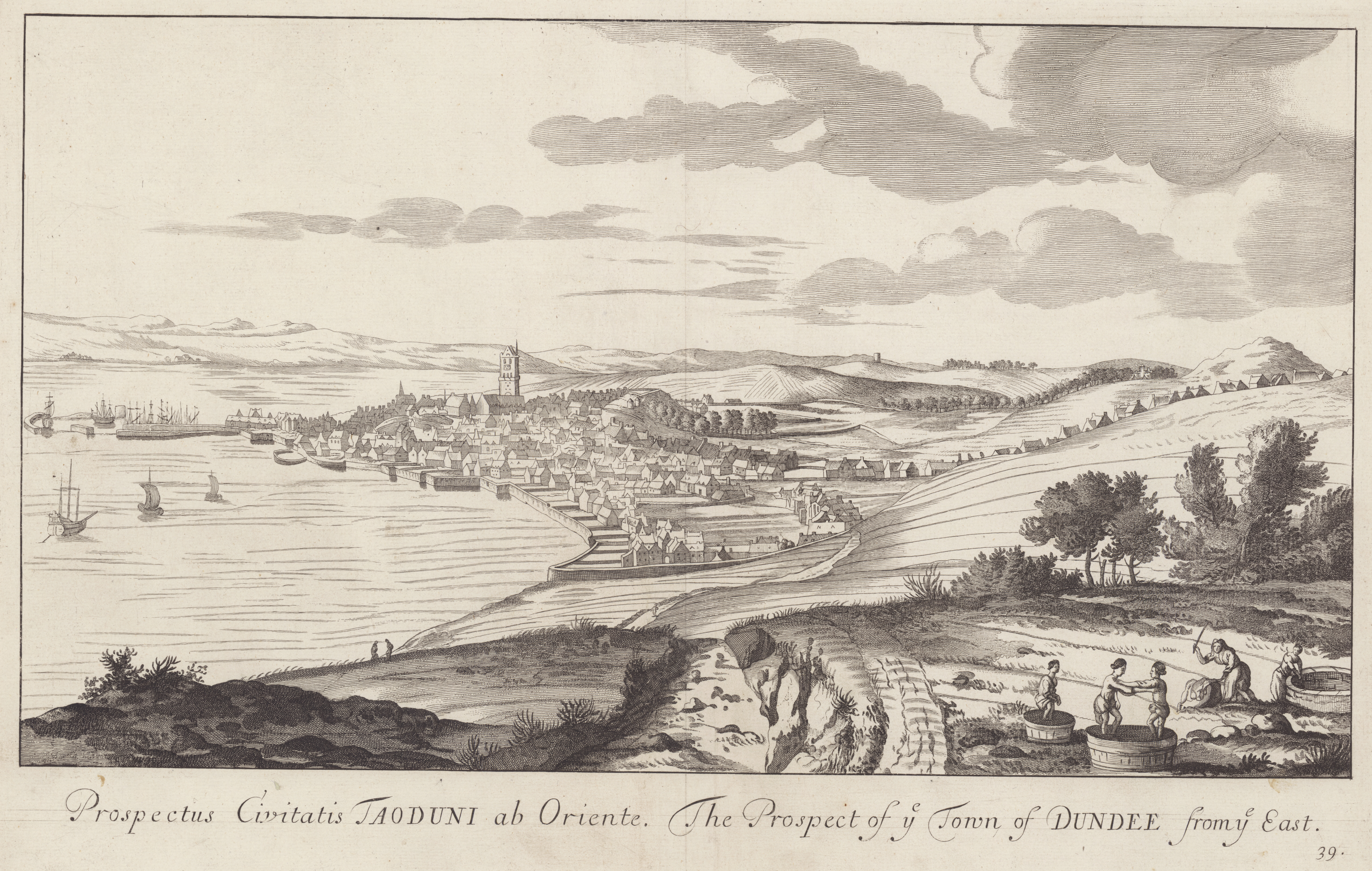
Dundee in 1693 by John Slezer

The burgh suffered considerably during the conflict known as the Rough Wooing of 1543 to 1550, and was occupied by the English forces of Andrew Dudley from 1547. In 1548, unable to defend the town against an advancing Scottish force, Dudley ordered that the town be burnt to the ground. In 1645, during the Wars of the Three Kingdoms, Dundee was again besieged, this time by the Royalist Marquess of Montrose. The town was finally destroyed by Parliamentarian forces led by George Monck in 1651. The town played a pivotal role in the establishment of the Jacobite cause when John Graham of Claverhouse, 1st Viscount Dundee raised the Stuart standard on the Dundee Law in 1689. The town was held by the Jacobites in the 1715–16 rising, and on 6 January 1716 the Jacobite claimant to the throne, James VIII and III (the Old Pretender), made a public entry into the town. Many in Scotland, including many in Dundee, regarded him as the rightful king.

A notable resident of Dundee was Adam Duncan, 1st Viscount Duncan of Camperdown, Baron of Lundie (1 July 1731 to 4 August 1804). He was born in Dundee on 1 July 1731, the son of Alexander Duncan of Lundie, Provost of Dundee. Adam was educated in Dundee and later joined the Royal Navy on board the sloop Trial. He rose to be admiral and in October 1797 defeated the Dutch fleet off Camperdown (north of Haarlem). This was seen as one of the most significant actions in naval history.

=== 18th and 19th centuries ===
The economy of medieval Dundee centred on the export of raw wool, with the production of finished textiles being a reaction to recession in the 15th century. Two government Acts in the mid 18th century had a profound effect on Dundee's industrial success: the textile industry was revolutionised by the introduction of large four-storey mills, stimulated in part by the 1742 Bounty Act which provided a government-funded subsidy on Osnaburg linen produced for export. Expansion of the whaling industry was triggered by the second Bounty Act, introduced in 1750 to increase Britain's maritime and naval skill base. Dundee, and Scotland more generally, saw rapid population increase at end of the 18th and beginning of the 19th century, with the city's population increasing from 12,400 in 1751 to 30,500 in 1821.

The phasing out of the linen export bounty between 1825 and 1832 stimulated demand for cheaper textiles, particularly for cheaper, tough fabrics. The discovery that the dry fibres of jute could be lubricated with whale oil (of which Dundee had a surfeit, following the opening of its gasworks) to allow it to be processed in mechanised mills resulted in the Dundee mills rapidly converting from linen to jute, which sold at a quarter of the price of flax. Interruption of Prussian flax imports during the Crimean War and of cotton during the American Civil War resulted in a period of inflated prosperity for Dundee and the jute industry dominated Dundee throughout the latter half of the 19th century. Unprecedented immigration, notably of Irish workers, led to accelerated urban expansion, and at the height of the industry's success, Dundee supported 62 jute mills, employing some 50,000 workers and Whatley and Tomlinson document "Dundee’s emergence as a Global City, 1830s-1870s".

Cox Brothers, who owned the massive Camperdown Works in Lochee, for a period in the later nineteenth century it was the largest jute works in the world and employed more than 5000 workers. The works formed part of Dundee's emergence as the principal centre of mechanised jute manufacture within the British Empire, processing raw fibre imported largely from Bengal and exporting finished goods to international markets.

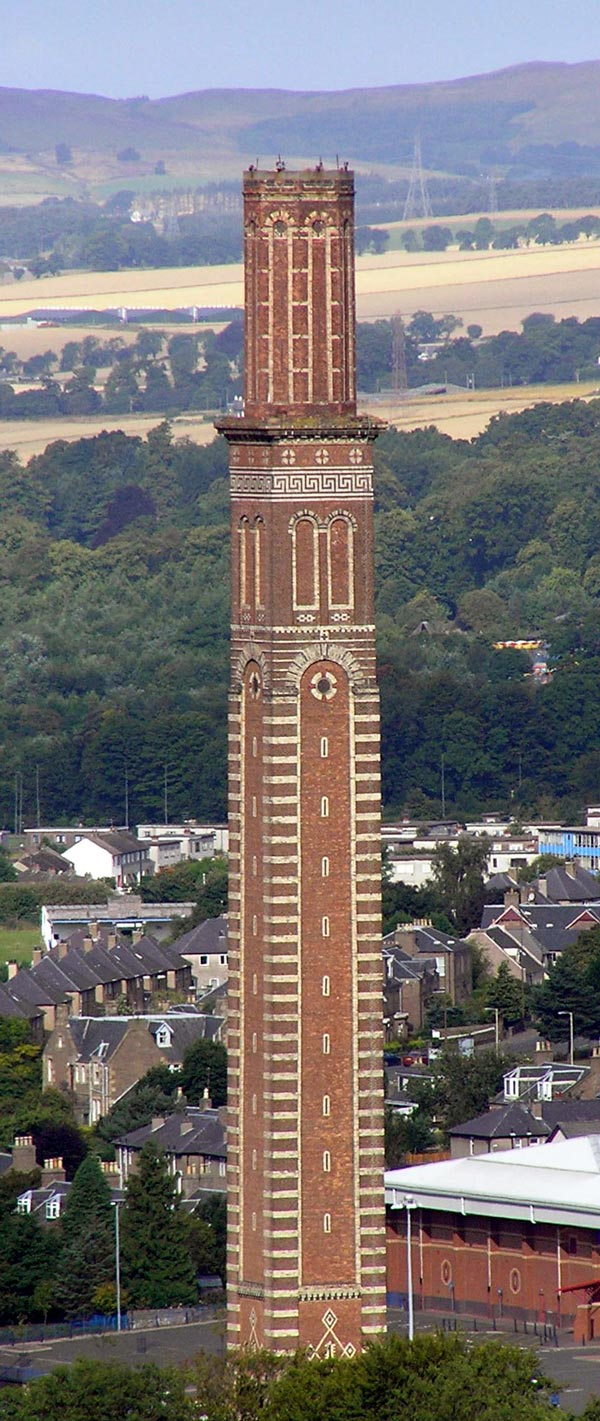
Cox's Stack, a Category A Listed Building in Lochee, Dundee, designed by George Addison Cox with James MacLaren, built 1865–6, visible on the city's skyline

Its most prominent surviving feature is Cox's Stack, a monumental chimney designed by George Addison Cox with architectural detailing by the Dundee architect James MacLaren, completed in 1866, and now a Category A listed building. Its height, elegant campanile form, and decorative brickwork suggest that Cox's Stack was intended as a prominent civic landmark for Dundee as well as a functional industrial chimney. To commemorate this, there is a small bronze statue of Cox's Stack on a plinth in Dundee High Street that was unveiled by Prince Charles in 1995 (Now King Charles III).

The rise of the textile industries brought with it an expansion of supporting industries, notably of the whaling, maritime and shipbuilding industries, and extensive development of the waterfront area started in 1815 to cope with increased demand for port capacity. At its height, 200 ships per year were built there, including Robert Falcon Scott's Antarctic research vessel, the RRS Discovery. This ship is now on display at Discovery Point in the city. A significant whaling industry was also based in Dundee, largely existing to supply the jute mills with whale oil. Whaling ceased in 1912 and shipbuilding ceased in 1981.

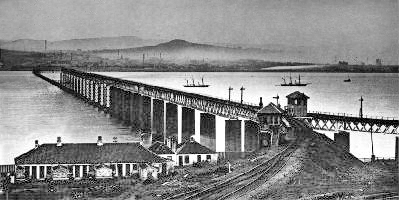
The original Tay Bridge (from the south) the day after the disaster. The collapsed section can be seen near the northern end.

While the city's economy was dominated by the jute industry, it also became known for smaller industries. Most notable among these were James Keiller's and Sons, established in 1795, which pioneered commercial marmalade production, and the publishing firm DC Thomson, which was founded in the city in 1905. Dundee was said to be built on the 'three Js': Jute, Jam and Journalism.

The population at the time of the 1841 census was 60,551 inhabitants.

The town was also the location of one of the worst rail disasters in British history, the Tay Bridge disaster. The first Tay Rail Bridge was opened in 1878. It collapsed only 18 months later during a storm, as a passenger train passed over it, resulting in the loss of 75 lives. The most destructive fire in the city's history came in 1906, reportedly sending "rivers of burning whisky" through the street. By the later nineteenth century Dundee occupied a distinctive position within the wider Industrial Revolution in Scotland.

=== 20th and 21st centuries ===
Although far from being a major employer, in the years before the First World War, fishing from Dundee was relatively important. In 1910 ten steam trawlers operated out of Dundee. Landings by weight were almost the same as in Anstruther, and far greater than in Arbroath. They were also of much greater value. It was only in that year that the Fishery Board chose to include trawlers in their statistics - hence the abrupt changes.

Fishery Statistics

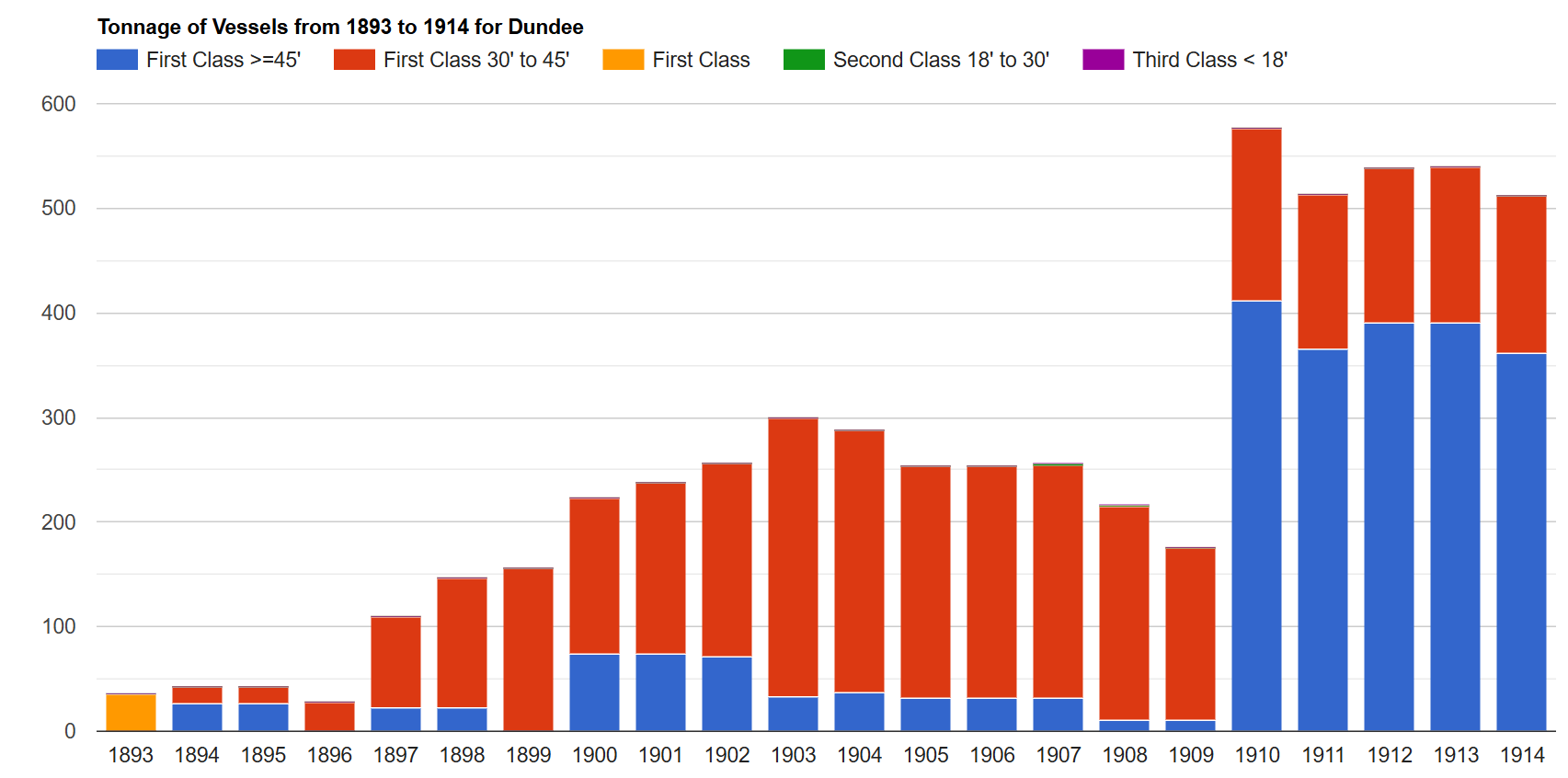
Tonnage of vessels

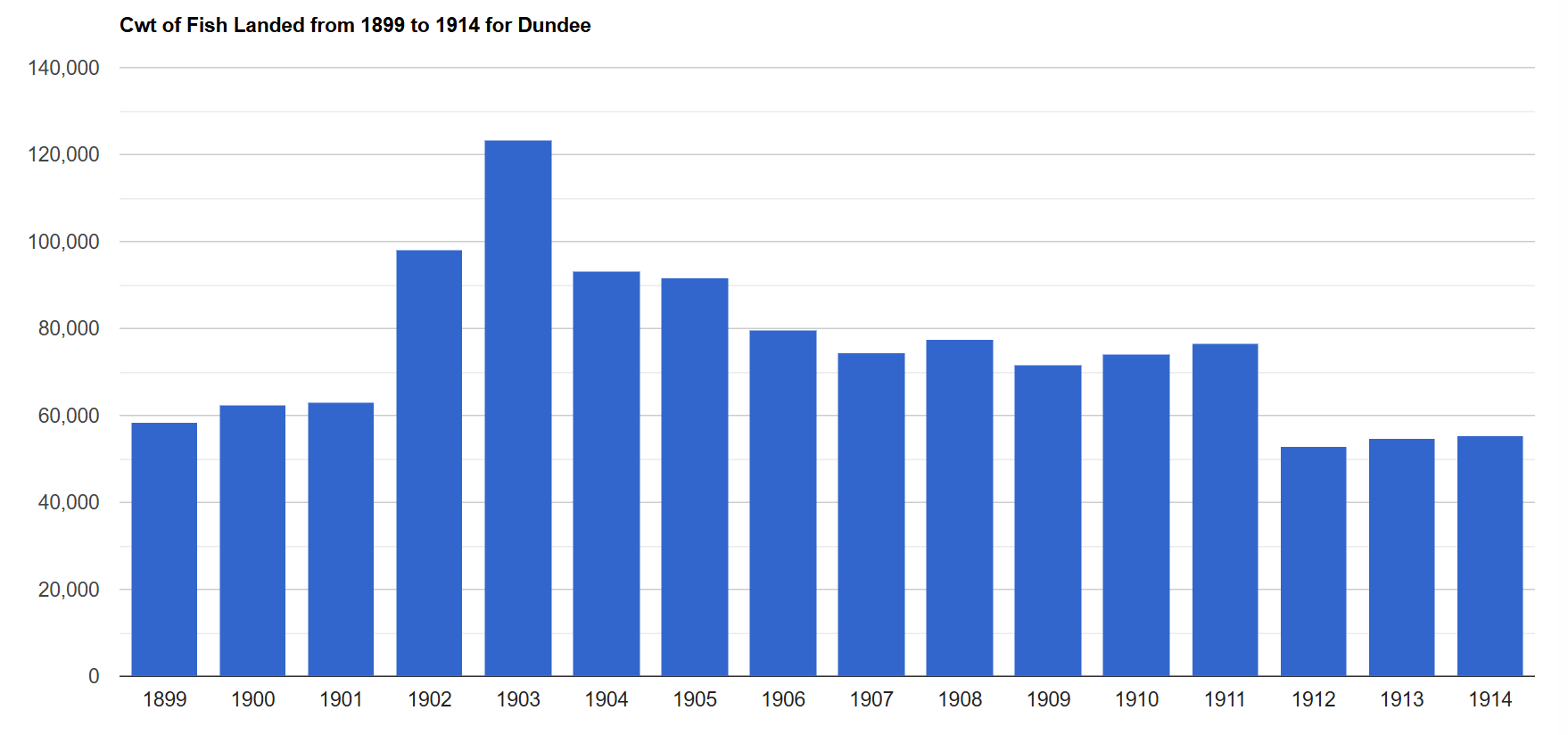
Cwt of fish landed

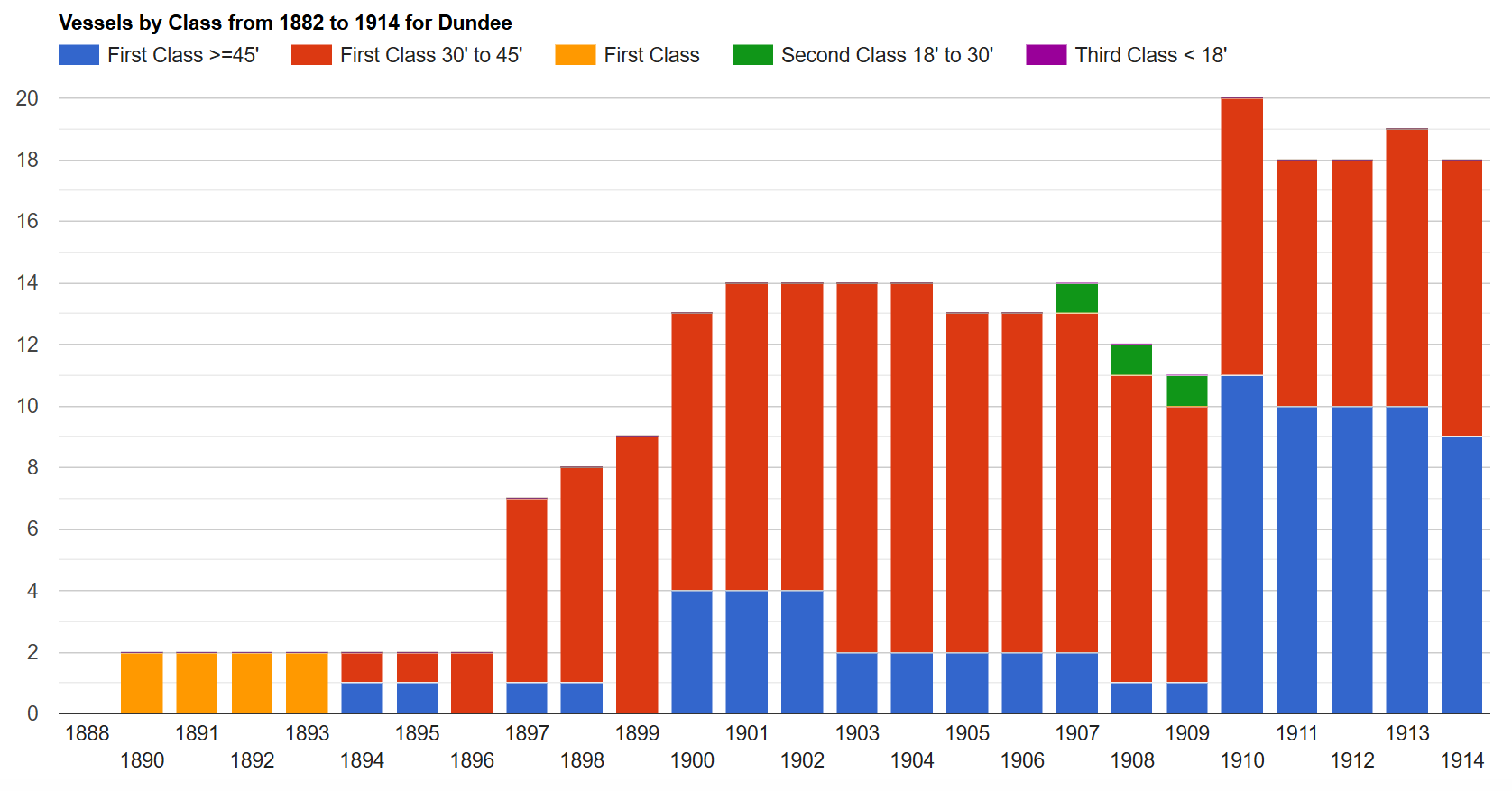
Vessels by class

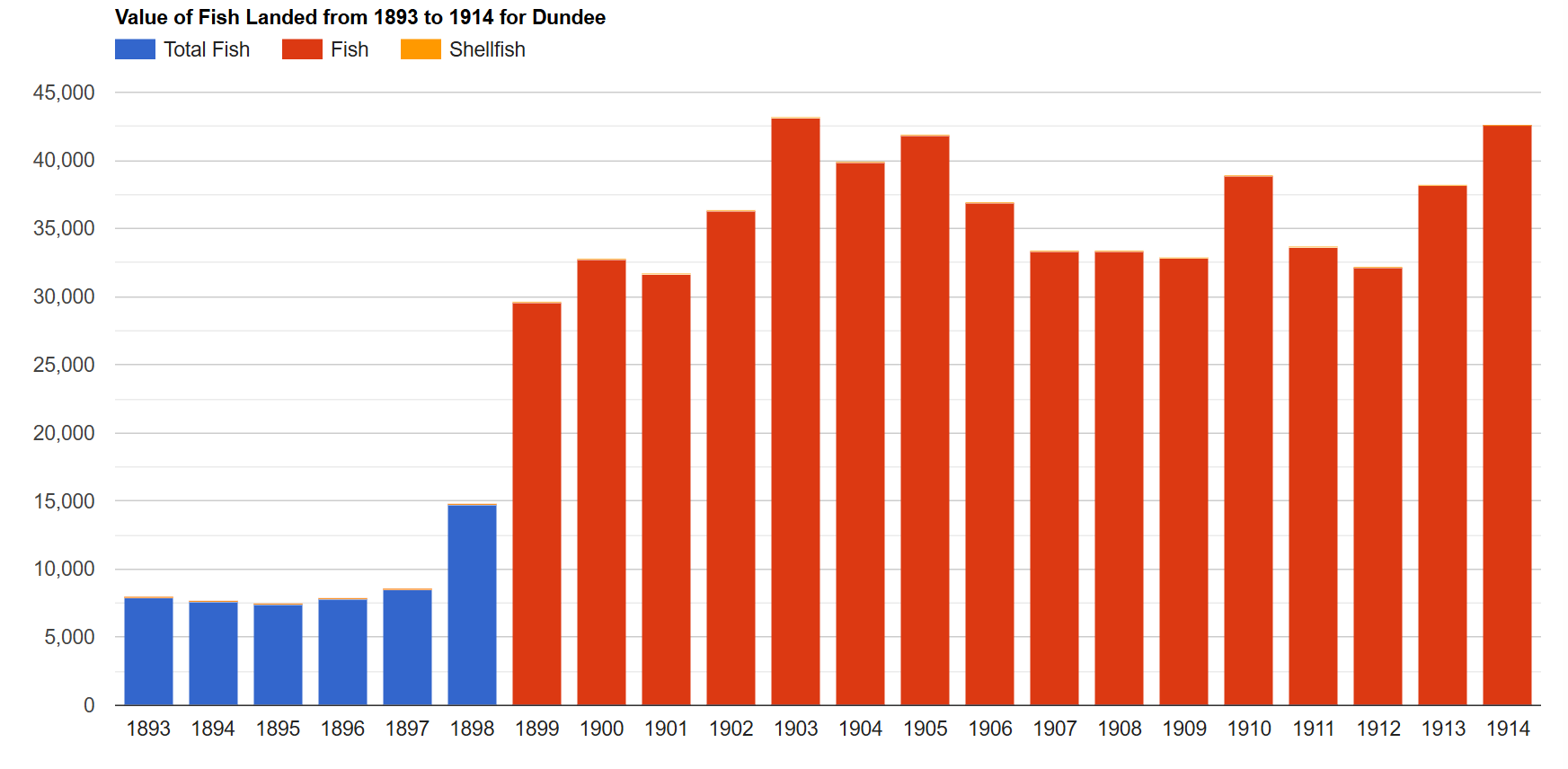
Value (£) of fish landed

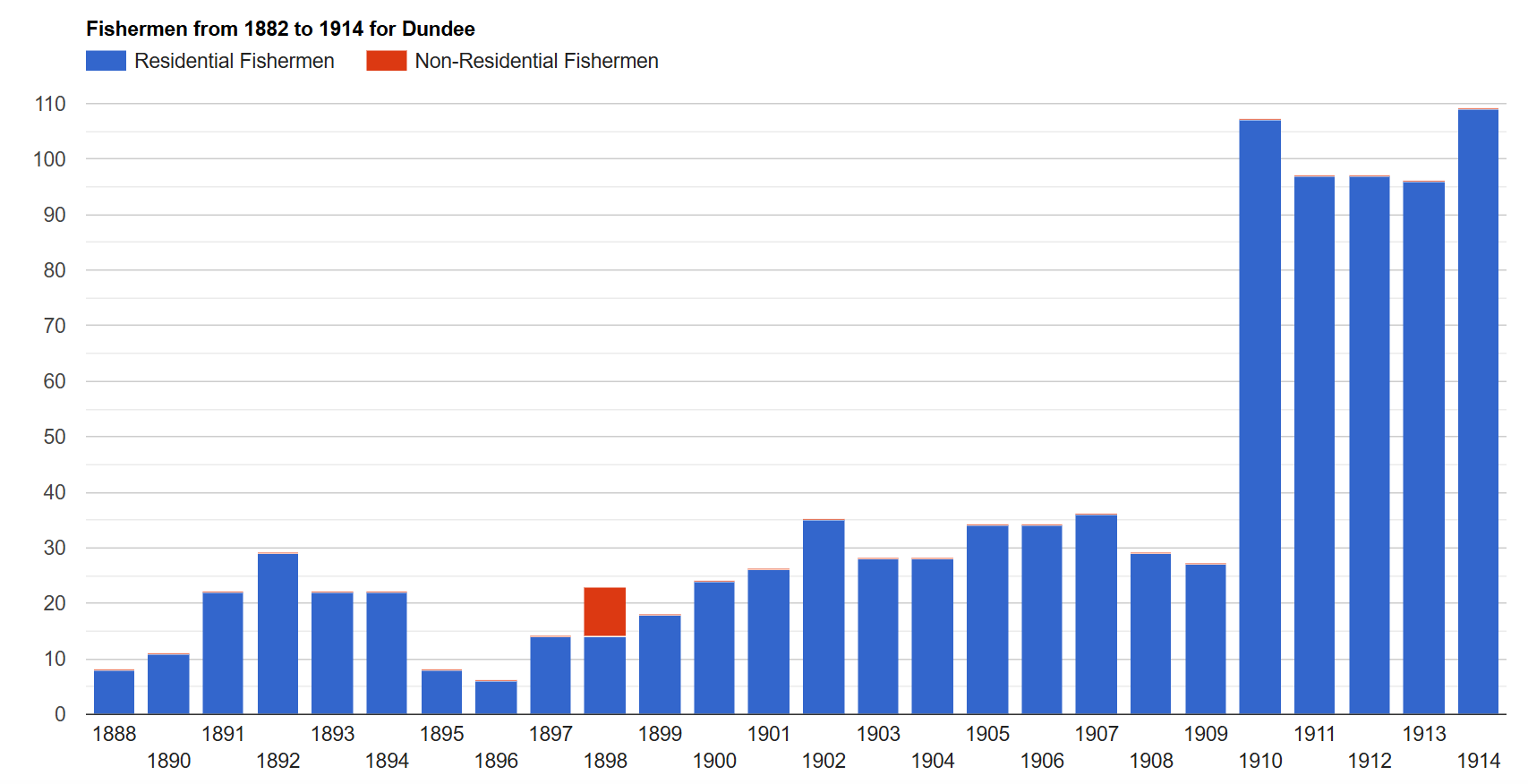
Fishermen

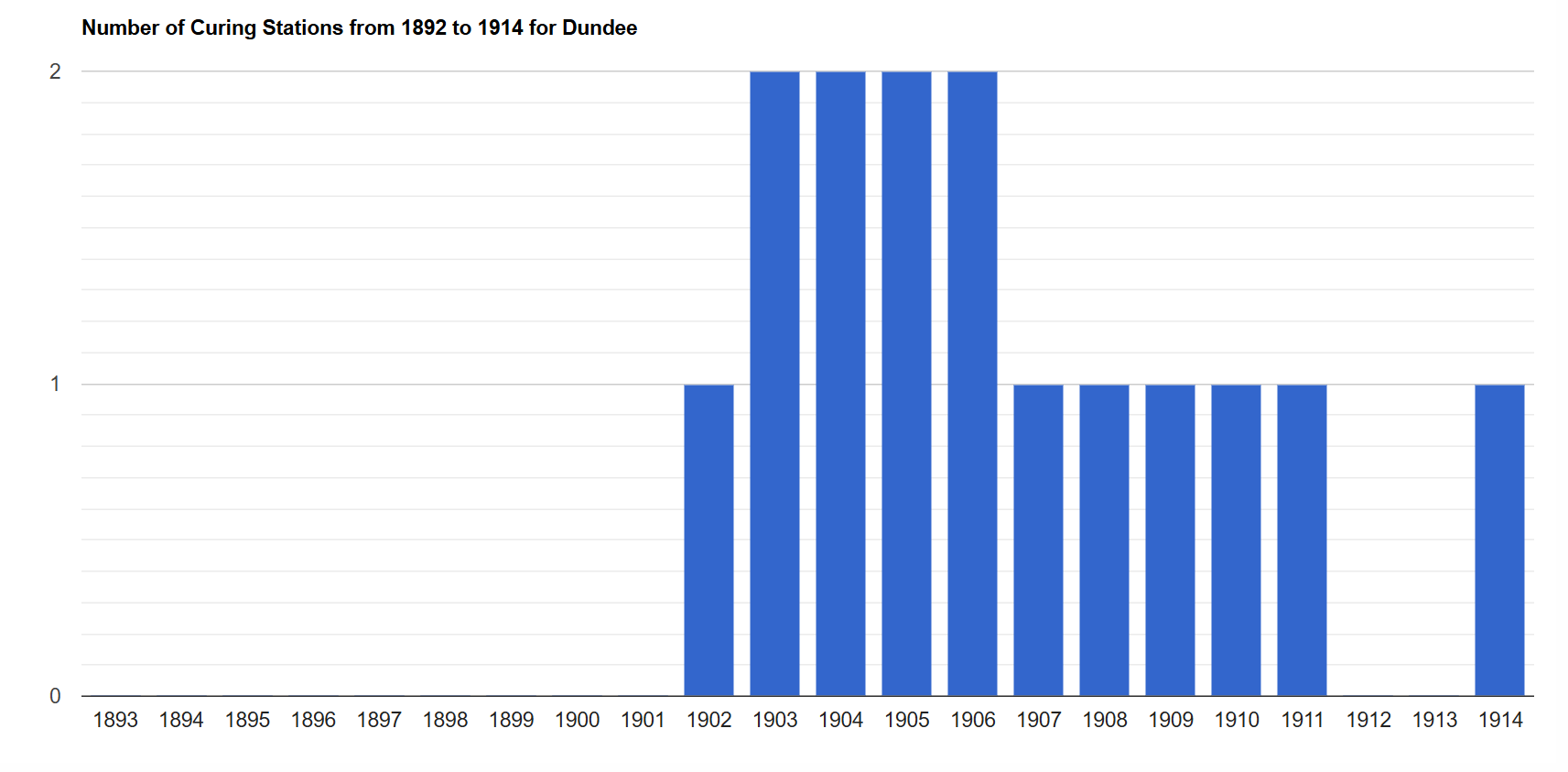
Number of curing stations

The jute industry fell into decline in the early 20th century, partly due to reduced demand for jute products and partly due to an inability to compete with the emerging industry in Calcutta. This gave rise to unemployment levels far in excess of the national average, peaking in the inter-war period, but major recovery was seen in the post-war period, thanks to the arrival first of American light engineering companies like Timex and NCR, and subsequent expansion into microelectronics.

Dundee was the first city in Scotland to gain official city status, after Queen Victoria signed a patent announcing the transition of Dundee from a royal burgh into a city. Dundee would officially gain city status on 26 January 1889. The patent still exists and is kept in storage in the city archives.

A £1 billion master plan to regenerate Dundee Waterfront is expected to last for a 30-year period between 2001 and 2031. The aims of the project are to reconnect the city centre to the waterfront; to improve facilities for walking, cyclists and buses; to replace the existing inner ring road with a pair of east/west tree-lined boulevards; and to provide a new civic square and a regenerated railway station and arrival space at the western edge. A new Victoria and Albert Museum opened on 15 September 2018.

In 2015, the National Commemoration marking the centenary of the battle of Loos was held in Dundee. The city had been selected due to the large number of men from the city who became casualties during the battle. In attendance on 25 September were the then Prince of Wales and his wife, Camilla, who was at the time the Duchess of Cornwall. Other distinguished attendees were Nicola Sturgeon, First Minister of Scotland, Tricia Marwick, Presiding Officer of the Scottish Parliament, and Bob Duncan, Lord Provost of Dundee. Approximately 1,000 people, including serving soldiers and veterans, also attended.

A new Eden Project attraction is also set to open in Dundee by the 2030s.

== Governance ==
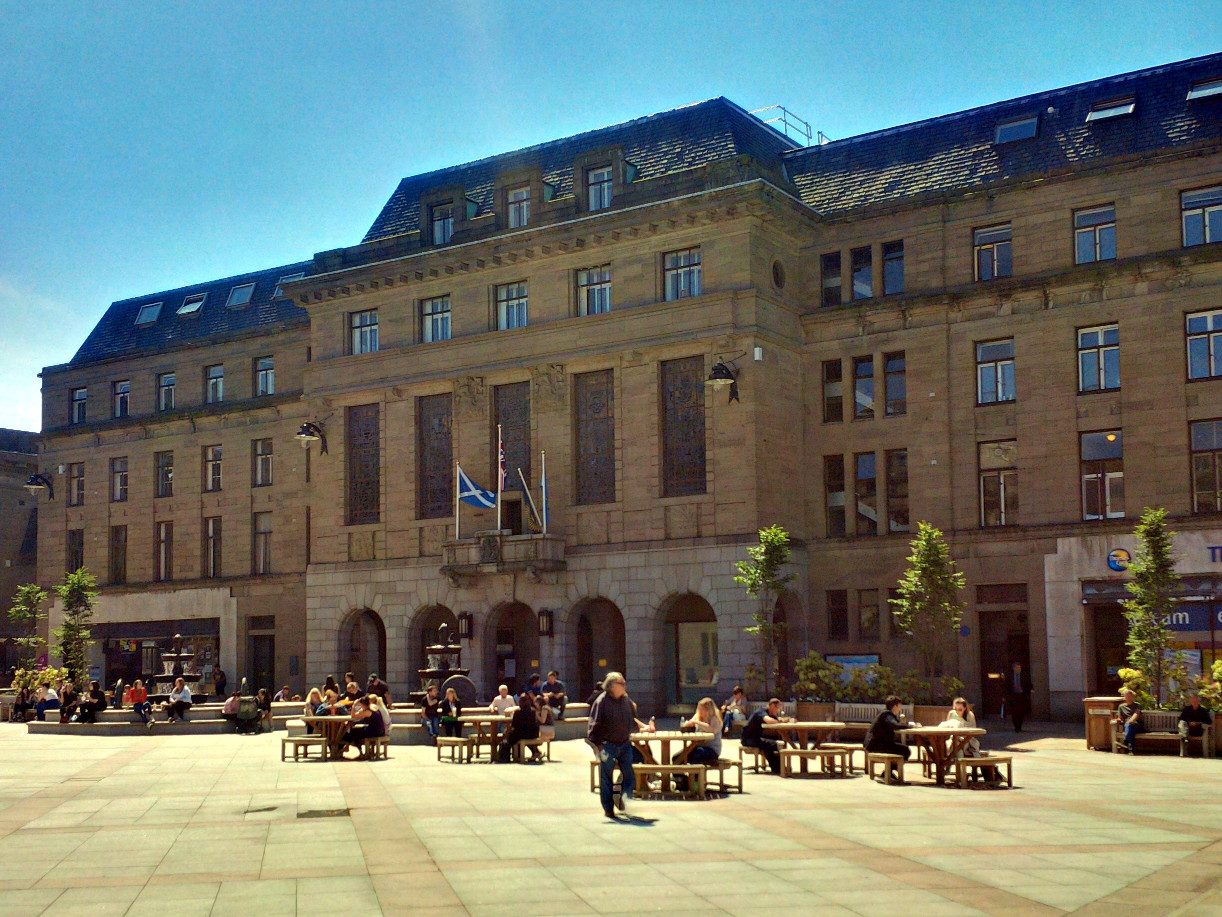
Dundee City Chambers, where the city council meets

=== Representation ===
Dundee City is one of 32 council areas of Scotland, administered by Dundee City Council. The council meets at Dundee City Chambers in City Square and has its mains offices at Dundee House on North Lindsay Street. The civic head and chair of the council is the Lord Provost. The council area is also divided into eighteen community council areas, three of which (Broughty Ferry, City Centre and Harbour, and West End) had community councils operating as at August 2024.

For elections to the House of Commons at Westminster, the city area and portions of the Angus council area are divided into two constituencies. The constituencies of Arbroath and Broughty Ferry and Dundee West are represented by Lara Bird (Scottish National Party) and Chris Law (Scottish National Party), respectively. Bird was elected at the 2026 Arbroath and Broughty Ferry by-election and Law was re-elected at the 2024 general election. For elections to the Scottish Parliament at Holyrood, the city area is divided across three constituencies. The Dundee City East constituency and the Dundee City West constituency are entirely within the city area. The Angus South (Holyrood) constituency includes north-eastern and north-western portions of the city area. All three constituencies are within the North East Scotland electoral region: Shona Robison (SNP) is the Member of the Scottish Parliament (MSP) for the Dundee East constituency; Joe Fitzpatrick (SNP) is the current MSP for the Dundee West constituency and Graeme Dey (SNP) is the current MSP for the Angus South constituency.

Winston Churchill served as one of two MPs for Dundee from 1908 to 1922.

=== Administrative history ===
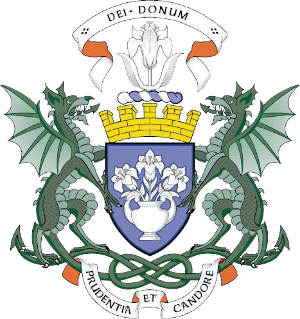
Coat of arms of the city of Dundee

Dundee appears to have been made a burgh sometime between 1181 and 1195. It was then raised to royal burgh status on the coronation of John Balliol as King of Scotland in 1292. The city has two mottos: Latin: Dei Donum ('Gift of God') and Prudentia et Candore ('With Thought and Purity') although usually only the latter is used for civic purposes.

Dundee was declared a city in 1889, being the first Scottish place to have the title of city explicitly conferred on it rather than assuming it by customary usage. In 1894, Dundee was made a county of itself, removing it from Angus. The city's boundaries were enlarged on numerous occasions, notably in 1913 when it absorbed the neighbouring burgh of Broughty Ferry.

From 1975 to 1996, Dundee was governed by the City of Dundee District Council, one of three district-level authorities within the Tayside region. The district was created under the Local Government (Scotland) Act 1973 and covered a larger area than the pre-1975 city, taking in the burgh of Monifieth and most of the landward district of Monifieth (covering a number of villages north of Dundee) from Angus, and the parish of Longforgan (which included Invergowrie) from Perthshire. In 1996, the Dundee City council area was created under the Local Government etc. (Scotland) Act 1994. Monifieth and the villages north of Dundee itself were transferred back to Angus, and the Longforgan area (including Invergowrie) was transferred to Perth and Kinross, largely reinstating the pre-1975 boundaries. Some controversy has ensued as a result of these boundary changes, with Dundee city councillors arguing for the return of Monifieth and Invergowrie.

=== Independence referendum ===
On 18 September 2014, Dundee was one of four council areas to vote "Yes" in the Scottish independence referendum, with 57.3% voting "Yes" on a 78.8% turnout. With the highest Yes vote for any local authority in Scotland, some in the Yes Scotland campaign nicknamed Dundee the "Yes City", including former First Minister Alex Salmond.

== Geography ==
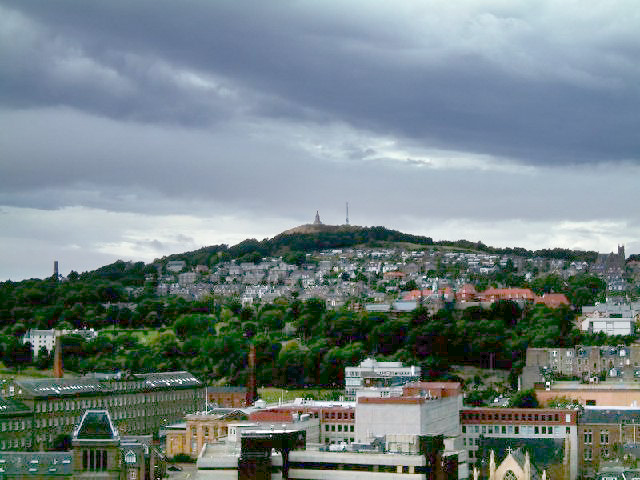
The Dundee Law

Dundee sits on the north bank of the Firth of Tay on the eastern, North Sea Coast of Scotland. The city lies 36.1 miles (58 km) NNE of Edinburgh and 360.6 miles (580 km) NNW of London. The built-up area occupies a roughly rectangular shape 8.3 miles (13 km) long by 2.5 miles (4 km) wide, aligned in an east to west direction and occupies an area of 60 square kilometres (23 sq mi). The town is bisected by a line of hills stretching from Balgay Hill (elevation of 143 m) in the west end of the city, through the Dundee Law (174 m) which occupies the centre of the built up area, to Gallow Hill (83 m), between Baxter Park and the Eastern Cemetery. North of this ridge lies a valley through which cuts the Dighty Water burn, the elevation falling to around 45 m. North of the Dighty valley lie the Sidlaw Hills, the most prominent hill being Craigowl Hill (455 m).

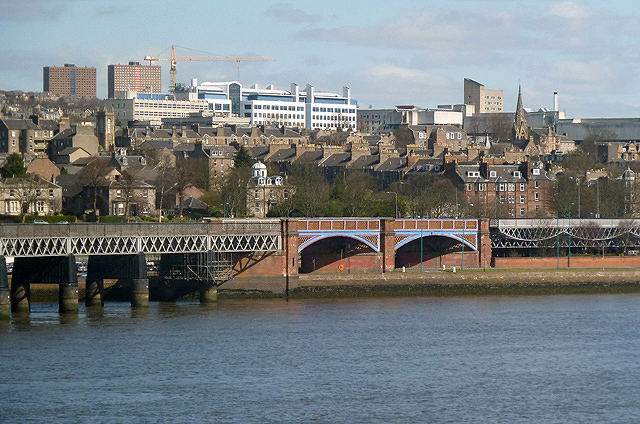
A cityscape from the Tay

The western and eastern boundaries of the city are marked by two burns that are tributaries of the River Tay. On the westernmost boundary of the city, the Lochee burn meets the Fowlis burn, forming the Invergowrie burn, which meets the Tay at Invergowrie basin. The Dighty Water enters Dundee from the village of Strathmartine and marks the boundaries of a number of northern districts of the city, joining the Tay between Barnhill and Monifieth. The Scouring burn in the west end of the city and Dens Burn in the east, both of which played important roles in the industrial development of the city, have now been culverted over.

=== Geology ===
The city lies within the Sidlaw-Ochil anticline, and the predominant bedrock type is Old Red Sandstone of the Arbuthnott-Garvock group. Differential weathering of a series of igneous intrusions has yielded a number of prominent hills in the landscape, most notably the Dundee Law (a late Silurian/early Devonian Mafic rock intrusion) and Balgay hill (a Felsic rock intrusion of similar age). In the east of the city, in Craigie and Broughty Ferry, the bedrock geology is of extrusive rocks, including mafic lava and tuff.

The land surrounding Dundee, particularly that in the lower lying areas to the west and east of the city, bears high quality soil that is particularly suitable for arable farming. It is predominantly of a brown forest soil type with some gleying, the lower parts being formed from raised beach sands and gravels derived from Old Red Sandstone and lavas.

=== Urban environment ===
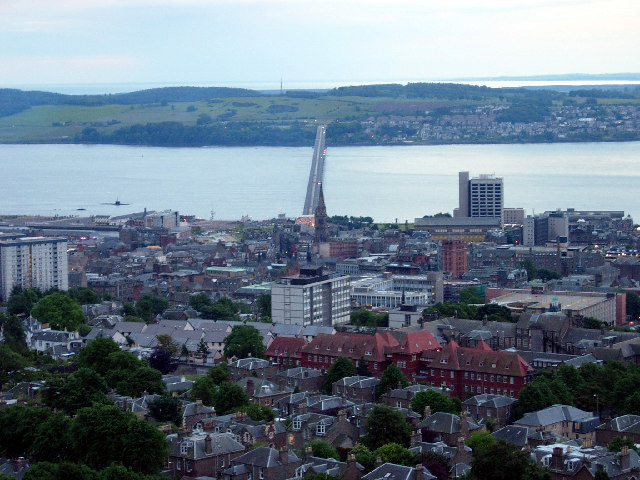
View from The Law, overlooking Dundee City Centre and the Tay Road Bridge

Very little of pre-Reformation Dundee remains, the destruction suffered in the War of the Rough Wooing being almost total, with only scattered, roofless shells remaining. The area occupied by the medieval burgh of Dundee extends between East Port and West Port, which formerly held the gates to the walled city. The shoreline has been altered considerably since the early 19th century through development of the harbour area and land reclamation. Several areas on the periphery of the burgh saw industrial development with the building of textile mills from the end of the 18th century. Their placement was dictated by the need for a water supply for the modern steam powered machinery, and areas around the Lochee Burn (Lochee), Scouring Burn (Blackness) and Dens Burn (Dens Road area) saw particular concentrations of mills. The post war period saw expansion of industry to estates along the Kingsway.

Working-class housing spread rapidly and without control throughout the Victorian era, particularly in the Hawkhill, Blackness Road, Dens Road and Hilltown areas. Despite the comparative wealth of Victorian Dundee as a whole, living standards for the working classes were very poor. A general lack of town planning coupled with the influx of labour during the expansion of the jute industry resulted in insanitary, squalid and cramped housing for much of the population. While gradual improvements and slum clearance began in the late 19th century, the building of the groundbreaking Logie housing estate marked the beginning of Dundee's expansion through the building of planned housing estates, under the vision of city architect James Thomson, whose legacy also includes the housing estate of Craigiebank and the beginnings of an improved transport infrastructure by planning the Kingsway bypass.

Modernisation of the city centre continued in the post-war period. The medieval Overgate was demolished in the early 1960s to make way for a shopping centre, followed by construction of the inner ring road and the Wellgate Shopping Centre. The Tay Road Bridge, completed in 1966, had as its northern landfall the docklands of central Dundee, and the new associated road system resulted in the city centre being cut off from the river. An acute shortage of housing in the late 1940s was addressed by a series of large housing estates built in the northern environs, including the Fintry, Craigie, Charleston and Douglas areas in the 1950s and early 1960s. These were followed by increasingly cost-effective and sometimes poorly planned housing throughout the 1960s. Much of this, in particular the high-rise blocks of flats at Lochee, Kirkton, Trottick, Whitfield, Ardler and Menzieshill, and the prefabricated Skarne housing blocks at Whitfield, has been demolished since the 1990s or is scheduled for future demolition.

Areas of Dundee and nearby settlements

Areas of Dundee:

1. Ardler
2. Balgay
3. Balgowan
4. Ballumbie
5. Blackness
6. Broughty Ferry
7. Barnhill
8. Camperdown
9. Charleston
10. City Centre
11. Claverhouse
12. Craigiebank
13. Douglas
14. Downfield
15. Dryburgh
16. Fintry
17. Gowrie Park
18. Hilltown
19. Kirkton
20. Dundee Law
21. Lochee
22. Logie
23. Menzieshill
24. Mill of Mains
25. Ninewells
26. Pitkerro
27. St Marys
28. Stobswell
29. West End
30. Whitfield
31. Woodside

=== Climate ===
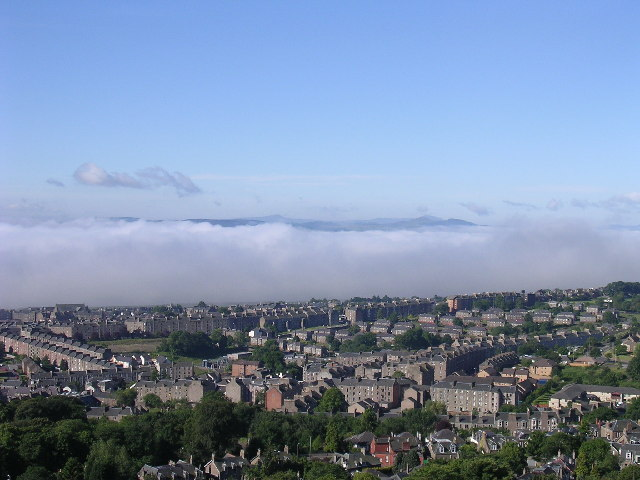
Haar (fog) travelling up the River Tay by advection

The climate, like the rest of lowland Scotland, is Oceanic (Köppen-Geiger classification Cfb). Mean temperature and rainfall are typical of the east coast of Scotland and with the city's sheltered estuarine position mean daily maxima are slightly higher than coastal areas to the North, particularly in spring and summer. The summers are still chilly when compared with similar latitudes in continental Europe, something compensated for by the mild winters, similar to the rest of the British Isles. The nearest official Met Office weather station is Mylnefield, Invergowrie which is about 4 miles (6.4 km) west of the city centre.

A record high of 30.5 °C (86.9 °F) was recorded in July 2022. The warmest month was July 2006, with an average temperature of 17.4 °C (63.3 °F) (average high 22.5 °C (72.5 °F), average low 12.3 °C (54.1 °F)). In an 'average' year the warmest day should reach 25.2 °C (77.4 °F), and in total just 1.86 days should equal or exceed a temperature of 25.0 °C (77.0 °F) per year, illustrating the rarity of such warmth.

On average 4.73 days should record a minimum temperature at or below -5 °C and there are 48.45 days of air frost on average. From 1991 to 2020 Mylnefield averaged 0.9 ice days, 50 days with precipitation of more than 5mm and 19.56 days with more than 10mm. The weather station is in plant-hardiness zone 10a.

Climate data for Mylnefield, elevation 31m, 1991–2020, extremes 1960–2010
Month	Jan	Feb	Mar	Apr	May	Jun	Jul	Aug	Sep	Oct	Nov	Dec	Year
Record high °C (°F)	14.6 (58.3)	15.2 (59.4)	21.6 (70.9)	22.9 (73.2)	23.7 (74.7)	27.8 (82.0)	29.3 (84.7)	28.7 (83.7)	25.0 (77.0)	22.8 (73.0)	16.7 (62.1)	14.5 (58.1)	29.3 (84.7)
Mean daily maximum °C (°F)	6.7 (44.1)	7.5 (45.5)	9.5 (49.1)	12.0 (53.6)	14.9 (58.8)	17.4 (63.3)	19.4 (66.9)	19.3 (66.7)	16.9 (62.4)	13.1 (55.6)	9.4 (48.9)	6.8 (44.2)	12.8 (55.0)
Daily mean °C (°F)	3.7 (38.7)	4.3 (39.7)	5.9 (42.6)	8.0 (46.4)	10.6 (51.1)	13.3 (55.9)	15.2 (59.4)	15.0 (59.0)	12.9 (55.2)	9.6 (49.3)	6.2 (43.2)	3.8 (38.8)	9.1 (48.4)
Mean daily minimum °C (°F)	0.7 (33.3)	1.1 (34.0)	2.3 (36.1)	4.0 (39.2)	6.3 (43.3)	9.2 (48.6)	11.0 (51.8)	10.8 (51.4)	9.0 (48.2)	6.2 (43.2)	3.0 (37.4)	0.8 (33.4)	5.4 (41.7)
Record low °C (°F)	−17.1 (1.2)	−11.2 (11.8)	−10.0 (14.0)	−4.4 (24.1)	−2.3 (27.9)	−0.7 (30.7)	2.8 (37.0)	1.7 (35.1)	−0.6 (30.9)	−3.4 (25.9)	−10.4 (13.3)	−12.7 (9.1)	−17.1 (1.2)
Average precipitation mm (inches)	69.3 (2.73)	54.0 (2.13)	49.5 (1.95)	45.2 (1.78)	51.0 (2.01)	62.5 (2.46)	65.6 (2.58)	74.5 (2.93)	54.3 (2.14)	85.1 (3.35)	71.9 (2.83)	65.9 (2.59)	748.7 (29.48)
Average precipitation days (≥ 1.0 mm)	12.1	9.7	9.4	8.6	9.7	10.8	11.0	10.6	9.4	11.6	12.4	11.9	127.3
Mean monthly sunshine hours	53.5	83.6	121.1	159.9	200.8	163.3	172.7	165.0	130.1	96.6	70.0	44.0	1,460.5
Source 1: Met Office (all data except extremes)
Source 2: KNMI/ Royal Netherlands Meteorological Institute, Meteoclimat

== Demography ==
Population pyramid of Dundee in 2020

=== Population ===
Dundee's recorded population reached a peak of 182,204 at the 1971 census. According to the 2011 census, the City of Dundee had a population of 147,268. A more recent population estimate of the City of Dundee has been recorded at 149,680 in 2020. The demographic make-up of the population is much in line with the rest of Scotland. The age group from 30 to 44 forms the largest portion of the population (20%). The median age of males and females living in Dundee was 37 and 40 years respectively, compared with 37 and 39 years for those in the whole of Scotland.

=== Residents ===
The place of birth of the town's residents was 94.16% United Kingdom (including 87.85% from Scotland), 0.42% Ireland, 1.33% from other European Union (EU) countries, and 3.09% from elsewhere in the world. The economic activity of residents aged 16–74 was 35.92% in full-time employment, 10.42% in part-time employment, 4.25% self-employed, 5.18% unemployed, 7.82% students with jobs, 4.73% students without jobs, 15.15% retired, 4.54% looking after home or family, 7.92% permanently sick or disabled, and 4.00% economically inactive for other reasons. Compared with the average demography of Scotland, Dundee has both low proportions of people born outside the United Kingdom and for people over 75 years old.

City of Dundee compared according to the 2011 UK census
	City of Dundee	Scotland	United Kingdom
Total population	147,268	5,295,403	63,182,000
Foreign born	9%	7%	12.7%
Over 75 years old	8.3%	7.7%	7.9%
Unemployed	5.7%	4.8%	7.4%

Natives of Dundee are called Dundonians and are often recognisable by their distinctive dialect of Scots as well as their accent, which most noticeably substitutes the monophthong /ɛ/ (pronounced "eh") in place of the diphthong /aj/ (pronounced "ai"). Dundee, and Scotland more generally, saw rapid population increase at end of the 18th and beginning of the 19th century, with the city's population increasing from 12,400 in 1751 to 30,500 in 1821. Of particular significance was an influx of Irish workers in the early to mid-19th century, attracted by the prospect of employment in the textiles industries. In 1851, 18.9% of people living in Dundee were of Irish birth.

The city has also attracted immigrants from Italy, fleeing poverty and famine, in the 19th century Jews, fleeing from the Russia controlled portions of partitioned Poland and from German occupation in the 20th. Today, Dundee has a sizeable ethnic minority population, and has around 4,000 Asian residents which is the fourth-largest Asian community in Scotland. The city also has 1.0% of residents from a Black/African/Caribbean background.

=== Students ===
Dundee has a higher proportion of university students – one in seven of the population – than any other town in Europe, except Heidelberg and Tübingen. The 14.2% come from all around the world to attend the local universities and colleges. Dundee is a major attraction for Northern Irish students who make up 5% of the total student population. The city's universities are believed to hold the highest percentage of Northern Irish students outside of Northern Ireland and have a big impact on the local economy and culture. However, this has declined in recent years due to the increase of tuition fees for students elsewhere in the UK. Dundee also has a lot of students from abroad, mostly from the Republic of Ireland and other EU countries but with an increasing number from countries from the Far East and Nigeria.

=== Languages ===
The 2022 Scottish Census reported that out of 144,803 residents aged three and over, 49,484 (34.2%) considered themselves able to speak or read the Scots language.

The 2022 Scottish Census reported that out of 144,793 residents aged three and over, 1,443 (1%) considered themselves able to speak or read Gaelic.

=== Ethnicity ===
Ethnic Group	1981 estimations		1991		2001		2011		2022	
Ethnic Group	Number	%	Number	%	Number	%	Number	%	Number	%
White: Total	172,162	98.6%	162,630	98%	140,330	96.31%	138,460	94%	133,621	89.9%
White: Scottish	–	–	–	–	128,507	88.22%	123,827	84.08%	114,803	77.21%
White: Other British	–	–	–	–	7,822	5.36%	7,783	5.28%	9,119	6.13%
White: Irish	–	–	1,167	0.7%	1,470	1%	1,369	0.93%	1,342	0.90%
White: Gypsy/Traveller (Note: New category created for the 2011 census)	–	–	–	–	–	–	98	–	87	–
White: Polish	–	–	–	–	–	–	1,990	1.35%	3,153	2.12%
White: Other	–	–	–	–	2,531	1.73%	3,393	2.30%	5,117	3.44%
Asian, Asian Scottish or Asian British: Total	–	–	2,573	1.55%	4,094	2.81%	5,838	3.96%	8,806	5.92%
Asian, Asian Scottish or Asian British: Indian	–	–	628	0.37%	1,023	0.70%	1,417	0.96%	2,068	1.39%
Asian, Asian Scottish or Asian British: Pakistani	–	–	1,157	0.69%	1,723	1.18%	2,047	1.39%	3,395	2.28%
Asian, Asian Scottish or Asian British: Bangladeshi	–	–	119	–	233	0.16%	310	0.21%	696	0.47%
Asian, Asian Scottish or Asian British: Chinese	–	–	398	0.24%	699	0.48%	1,274	0.87%	1,342	0.90%
Asian, Asian Scottish or Asian British: Asian Other	–	–	271	0.16%	416	0.29%	790	0.54%	1,309	0.88%
Black, Black Scottish or Black British (Note: Category restructured for the 2011 census)	–	–	254	0.15%	35	–	–	–	–	–
African: Total	–	–	–	–	288	0.19%	1,170	0.79%	2,090	1.41%
African: African, African Scottish or African British	–	–	–	–	288	0.19%	1,163	0.79%	108	–
African: Other African	–	–	–	–	–	–	7	–	1,982	1.33%
Caribbean or Black: Total	–	–	-	-	60	-	269	0.18%	187	0.13%
Caribbean	–	–	–	–	60	–	167	0.11%	62	–
Black	–	–	–	–	–	–	66	–	18	–
Caribbean or Black: Other	–	–	–	–	–	–	36	–	110	–
Mixed or multiple ethnic groups: Total	–	–	–	–	395	0.27%	685	0.46%	1,970	1.32%
Other: Total	–	–	416	0.25%	461	0.31%	846	0.57%	2,023	1.36%
Other: Arab	–	–	–	–	–	–	693	0.47%	1,244	0.84%
Other: Any other ethnic group			416	0.25%	461	0.31%	153	0.1%	779	0.52%
Non-White: Total	2,475	1.4%	3,243	2%	5,333	3.6%	8,808	6%	15,076	10.1%
Total:	174,637	100%	165,873	100%	145,663	100%	147,268	100%	148,697	100%

The proportion of people residing in Dundee born outside the UK was 12.9% in 2022, compared with 9.0% in 2011 and 4.9% in 2001. Below are the fifteen largest overseas-born groups in Dundee according to the 2022 census, alongside the two previous censuses.

Country of birth	2022	2011	2001
Poland	2,616	1,807	127
India	1,449	986	599
Pakistan	1,364	862	701
Nigeria	1,186	601	66
Germany	775	899	696
United States	602	314	209
China	553	730	298
Ireland	529	572	625
Italy	474	199	197
Romania	435	95	11
Bangladesh	434	201	125
Spain	362	166	114
Latvia	355	211	0
Hong Kong	309	246	201
Malaysia	299	291	155
Overall – all overseas-born	19,194	13,253	7,198

=== Religion ===
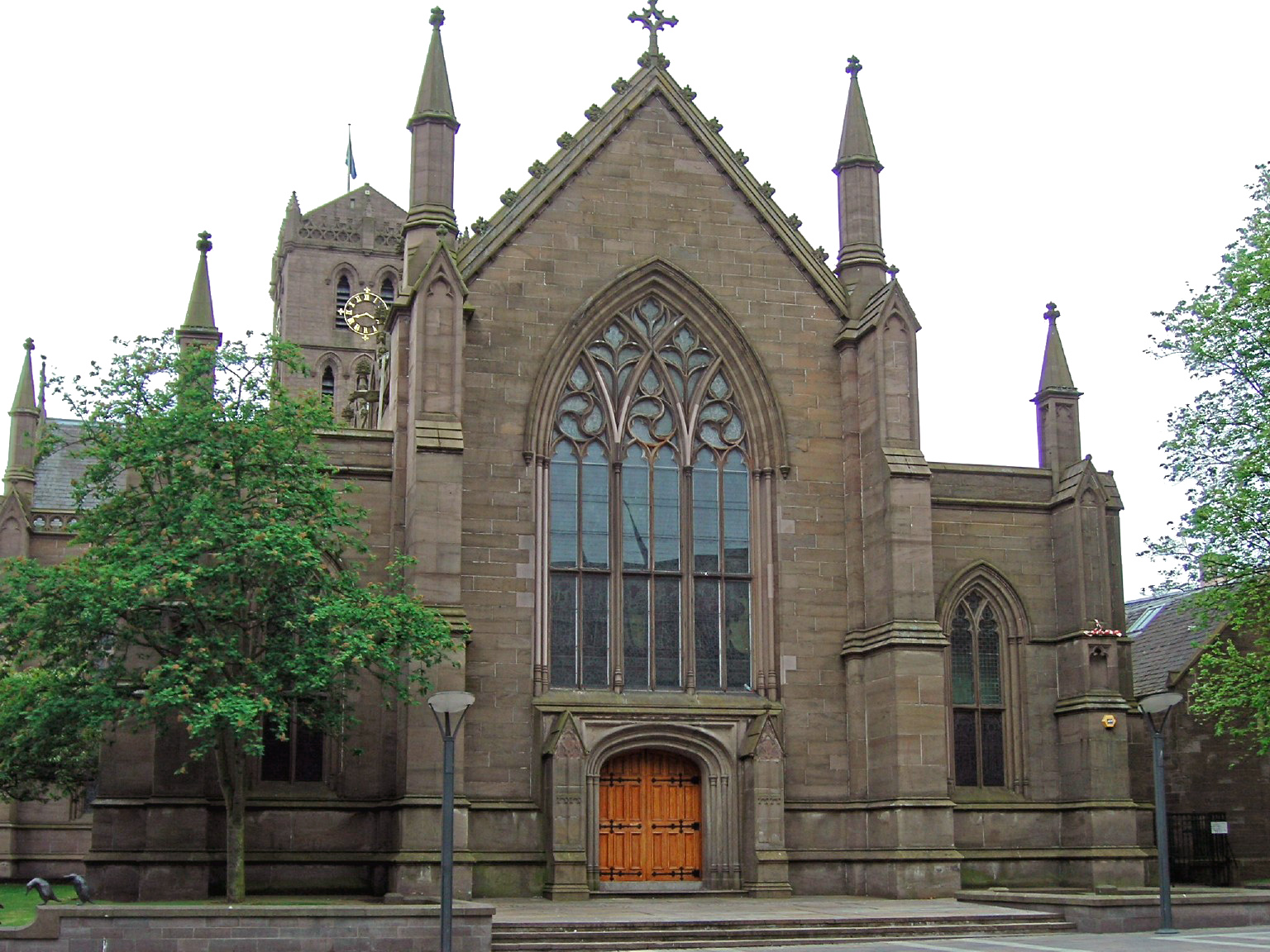
Dundee Parish Church, St Mary's is one of three of the Dundee's City Churches which are joined; only two function as places of worship: St. Mary's and St. Clement's (the Old Steeple) which can be seen in the background.

The Church of Scotland Presbytery of Dundee is responsible for overseeing the worship of 37 congregations in and around the Dundee area, although changing population patterns have led to some of the churches becoming linked charges. Due to their city centre location, the City Churches, Dundee Parish Church (St Mary's) and the Steeple Church, are the most prominent Church of Scotland buildings in Dundee. They are on the site of the medieval parish kirk of St Mary, of which only the 15th-century west tower survives. The attached church was once the largest parish church in medieval Scotland.

Dundee was unusual among Scottish medieval burghs in having two parish kirks; the second, dedicated to St Clement, has disappeared, but its site was approximately that of the present City Square. Other presbyterian groups include the Free Church which meet at St. Peters (the historic church of Robert Murray M'Cheyne).

In the Middle Ages Dundee was also the site of houses of the Dominicans (Blackfriars), and Franciscans (Greyfriars), and had a number of hospitals and chapels. These establishments were sacked during the Scottish Reformation, in the mid-16th century, and were reduced to burial grounds, now Barrack Street (also referred to as the Dek-tarn street) and The Howff burial ground, respectively.

Religion of Dundee residents, 2022
No religion	54.6%
Christian	33.2%
Religion not stated	6.0%
Muslim	4.2%
Hindu	0.8%
Buddhist	0.5%
Pagan	0.5%
Other religion	0.2%
Sikh	0.1%
Jewish	0.07%
Source: 2022 census

St. Paul's Cathedral is the seat of the Scottish Episcopal Diocese of Brechin. It is charged with overseeing the worship of 9 congregations in the city, as well as a further 17 in Angus, the Carse of Gowrie and parts of Aberdeenshire. Since 2018 the diocese has been led by Bishop Andrew Swift. St. Andrew's Cathedral is the seat of the Roman Catholic Diocese of Dunkeld, led by Bishop Stephen Robson. The diocese is responsible for overseeing 15 congregations in Dundee and 37 in the surrounding area, including St Mary, Our Lady of Victories Church in the city.

There are Methodist, Baptist, Congregationalist, Pentecostal and Salvation Army churches in the city, and non-mainstream Christian groups are also well represented, including the Unitarians, the Society of Friends, the Jehovah's Witnesses, Seventh-day Adventists, Christadelphians, and The Church of Jesus Christ of Latter-day Saints.

Muslims are served by the Dundee Central Mosque, built in 2000 to replace their former premises on the Hilltown. There are three other mosques in the city including Jamia Masjid Tajdare Madina on Victoria Road, Jame Masjid Bilal on Dura Street and Al Maktoum Mosque on Wilkie's Lane. Alongside these there is an Islamic Society on the University of Dundee campus.

The Sikh community is served by the Guru Nanak Gurdwara on Victoria Road, which serves its community in Dundee.

A recorded Jewish community has existed in the city since the early 19th century. There is a small Orthodox synagogue at Dudhope Park which was built in the 1960s, with the Hebrew Burial Grounds located three miles (4.8 km) to the east. Dundee Buddhist Group is a Buddhist Temple based in Reform Street. There is also a Hindu mandir in Taylor's Lane, situated in the West End of the city.

== Economy ==
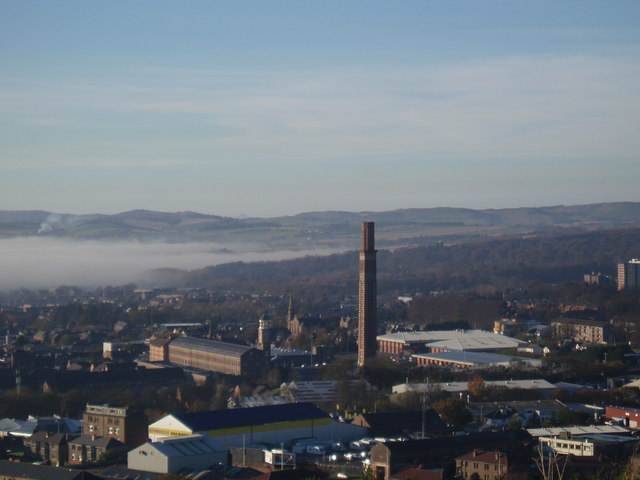
Cox's Stack, a chimney from the former Camperdown Works jute mill. The chimney takes its name from jute baron James Cox who later became Provost of the city.

In 1911 40% of the city's population was employed in the jute industry. By 1951 this had dropped to 20%, and now is effectively zero. The period following World War II was notable for the transformation of the city's economy. While jute still employed one-fifth of the working population, new industries were attracted and encouraged. NCR Corporation selected Dundee as the base of operations for the UK in late 1945, primarily because of the lack of damage the city had sustained in the war, good transport links and high productivity from long hours of sunshine. Production started in the year before the official opening of the plant on 11 June 1947. A fortnight after the tenth anniversary of the plant the 250,000th cash register was produced. By the 1960s, NCR had become the principal employer of the city producing cash registers, and later ATMs, at several of its Dundee plants. The firm developed magnetic-strip readers for cash registers and produced early computers. Astral, a Dundee-based firm that manufactured and sold refrigerators and spin dryers was merged into Morphy Richards and rapidly expanded to employ over 1,000 people. The development in Dundee of a Michelin tyre-production facility helped to absorb the unemployment caused by the decline of the jute industry, particularly with the abolition of the jute control by the Board of Trade on 30 April 1969.

Employment in Dundee changed dramatically during the 1980s with the loss of nearly 10,000 manufacturing jobs due to closure of the shipyards, cessation of carpet manufacturing and the disappearance of the jute trade. To combat growing unemployment and declining economic conditions, Dundee was declared an Enterprise Zone in January 1984. In 1983, the first ZX Spectrum home computers were produced in Dundee by Timex. In the same year the company broke production records, despite a sit-in by workers protesting against job cuts and plans to demolish one of the factory buildings to make way for a supermarket. Timex closed its Dundee plant in 1993 following an acrimonious six-month industrial dispute. The Michelin Tyre factory closed in June 2020, with the loss of 850 jobs.

Dundee is a regional employment and education centre, with around 325,000 people within 30 minutes' drive of the city centre and 860,000 people within one hour. Many people from North East Fife, Angus and Perth and Kinross commute to the city. As of 2015, there were 395 employers who employed 250 or more staff; over a five-year period (2011–2015) the number of registered enterprises in Dundee increased by 20.9% from 2,655 to 3,210. The largest employers in the city are NHS Tayside, Dundee City Council, University of Dundee, Tayside Contracts, Tesco, D. C. Thomson & Co and BT. Several government agencies and public sector organisations are based in Dundee, such as the Care Inspectorate (Scotland), the Scottish Social Services Council and Social Security Scotland.

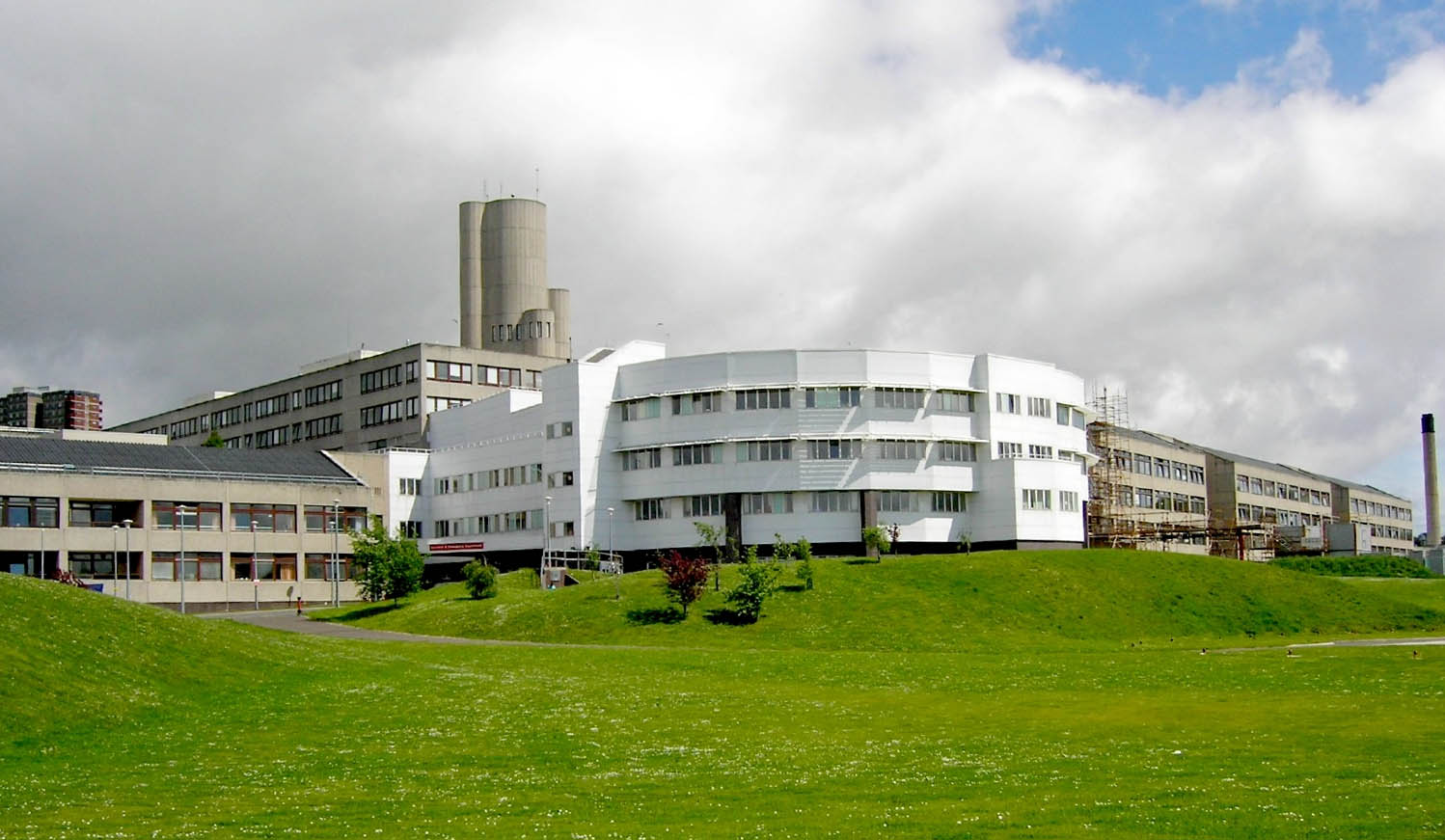
Ninewells Hospital, one of the largest employers in the Dundee area

Other employers include limited and private companies such as NCR, Michelin, Alliance Trust, Aviva, Royal Bank of Scotland, Asda, Stagecoach Strathtay, Tokheim, Scottish Citylink, Rochen Limited, C J Lang & Son (SPAR Scotland), Joinery and Timber Creations, Xplore Dundee, and W. L. Gore and Associates. Between 2009 and 2014 the hardest-hit sectors, in terms of jobs, were Information and Communication, Construction and Manufacturing which each lost around 500 full-time jobs. By contrast, the Professional, Scientific and Technical sector saw an upsurge in jobs in addition to the Business Administration and Support Service sector which increased by approximately 1,000 full-time and 300 part-time jobs in the same six-year period. Gross median weekly earnings of full-time employees in Dundee in 2015 was £523.50; men received £563.40 and women £451.80. Gross weekly pay for all employees in Dundee has increased from £325.00 in 2000 to £380.00 in 2015.

The biomedical and biotechnology sectors, including start-up biomedical companies arising from university research, employ just under 1,000 people directly and nearly 2,000 indirectly. Information technology and video game development have been important industries in the city for more than 20 years.

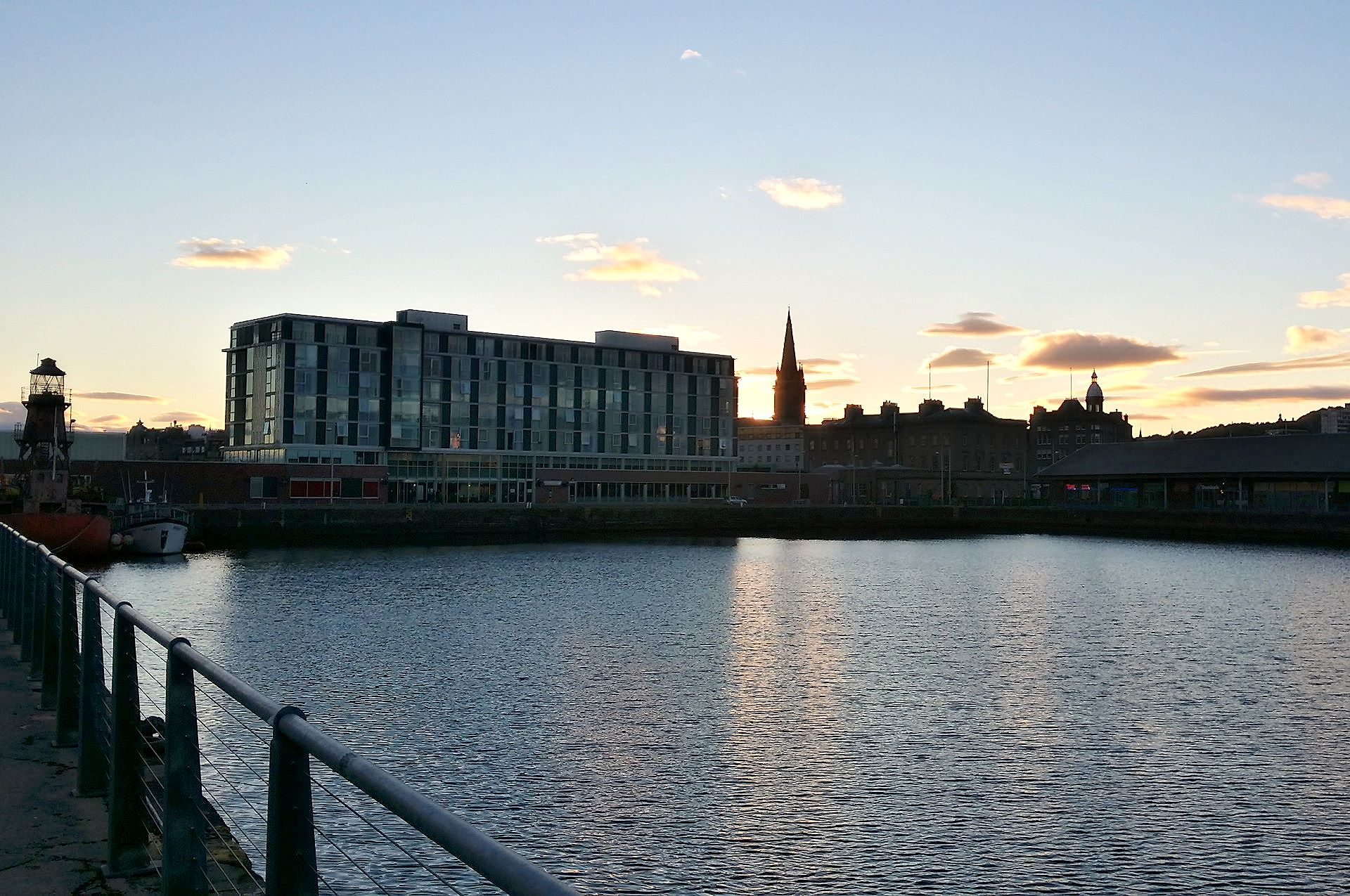
Evening in Dundee docks with the Apex Hotel in the background

Rockstar North, developer of Lemmings and the Grand Theft Auto series was founded in Dundee as DMA Design by David Jones; an undergraduate of the Abertay University. Rockstar Games returned to Dundee in 2020 when they acquired Ruffian Games to form Rockstar Dundee. Other game development studios in Dundee include Denki, Dynamo Games, 4J Studios and Outplay Entertainment, among others.

Dundee is also a key retail destination for North East Scotland and has been ranked fourth in Retail Rankings in Scotland. The city centre offers a wide variety of retailers, department stores and independent/specialist stores. The main pedestrian area also connects the two large shopping centres; the 420,000-square-foot (39,000-square-metre) Overgate Centre which is anchored by Primark, H&M, Next, Argos, and The Perfume Shop and the 310,000-square-foot (29,000-square-metre) Wellgate Centre by Home Bargains, T. J. Hughes, B&M, Superdrug, Iceland, Holland & Barrett, Poundland, Savers, The Works, Hydro Electric, Other retail areas in the city include Gallagher Retail Park, Kingsway East Retail Park and Kingsway West Retail Park. The new Myrekirk Retail Park opened in 2022.

== Transport ==
=== Road ===
Dundee is served by the A90 road, which connects the city to the M90 and Perth in the west with Forfar and Aberdeen in the north. The part of the road that is in the city is a dual carriageway and forms the city's main bypass on its north side, known as the Kingsway. East of the A90's Forfar Road junction, the Kingsway East continues as the A972 and meets the A92 at the Scott Fyffe roundabout. Travelling east, the A92 connects the city to Arbroath and Montrose and to the south with Fife, via the Tay Road Bridge.

The A930 links the city with coastal settlements to the east, including Monifieth and Carnoustie. Progressing westward from where the A92 meets the Tay Road Bridge at the Riverside Roundabout, the A85 follows the southern boundary of the city along Riverside Drive and towards the A90 at the Swallow Roundabout. The A85 multiplexes with the A90 and diverges again at Perth.

Also meeting the A92 and A85 at the Riverside Roundabout is the A991 Inner Ring Road, which surrounds the perimeter of the city centre, returning to the A92 on the east side of the Tay Road Bridge. The A923 Dundee to Dunkeld road meets the A991 at the Dudhope Roundabout, and the A929 links the A991 to the A90 via Forfar Road.

=== Bus ===
Dundee has an extensive network of bus routes. The Seagate bus station is the city's main terminus for journeys out of town. Xplore Dundee operates most of the intra-city services, with other more rural services operated by Stagecoach Strathtay and Moffat & Williamson. In the Dundee built‑up area, there are five railway stations: Invergowrie, Dundee, Broughty Ferry, Balmossie, and Monifieth. Although Invergowrie is part of Perth and Kinross, and Balmossie and Monifieth lie within Angus, all three form part of a contiguous urban area with Dundee. The main station, named Dundee, is situated near the waterfront and was rebuilt in 2018 as part of the waterfront redevelopment programme. The station now also includes a hotel and a Tesco Express.

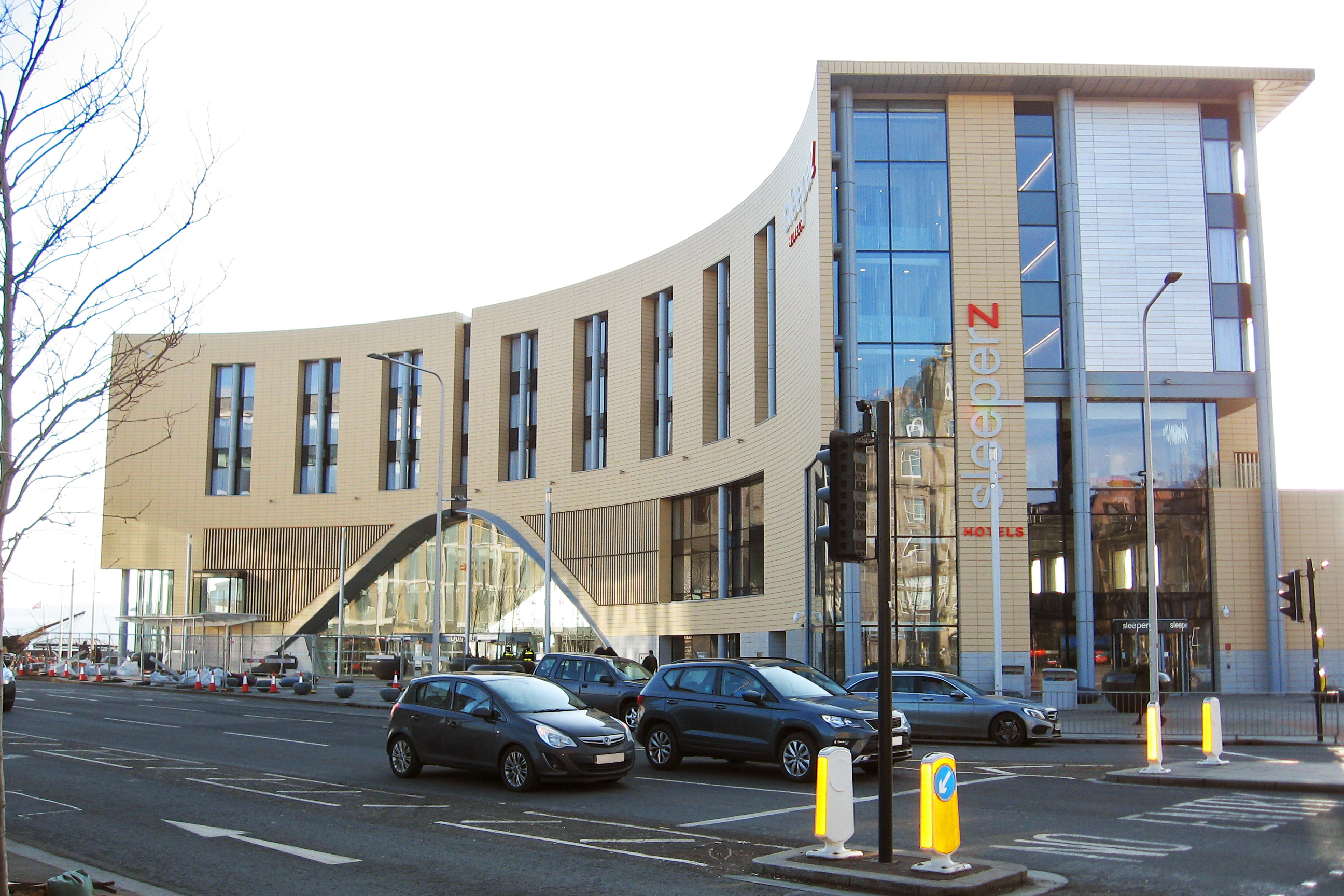
External view of the rebuilt entrance to Dundee railway station after its 2018 reopening

There are also many inter-city bus services offered by Citylink, National Express and more recently Ember

=== Rail, air and sea ===
Passenger services at Dundee are provided by ScotRail, CrossCountry, Caledonian Sleeper and London North Eastern Railway. There are other nearby stations at Invergowrie, Balmossie and Monifieth. No freight trains have served the city since the Freightliner terminal in Dundee was closed in the 1980s.

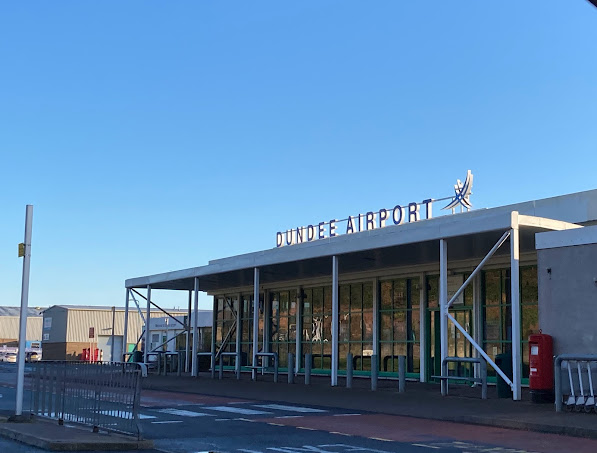
Dundee Airport in 2021

Dundee Airport offers commercial flights to Heathrow Airport, Kirkwall Airport, and Sumburgh (Shetland) by Loganair. The airport is capable of serving small aircraft and is located 3 kilometres (1.9 mi) west of the city centre, adjacent to the River Tay. The nearest major international airport is Edinburgh Airport, 59.2 miles (95.3 km) to the south.

The cargo port of Dundee is one of the largest economic generators in the city and is operated by Forth Ports. Seafarers arriving at the port are offered welfare and pastoral assistance by seafarers charity Apostleship of the Sea. In recent years the seaport has seen a significant increase in cruises arriving at port. In 2023 Ambassador Cruise Line made Dundee a port call following the launch of their second ship, Ambition. Cruises from Dundee depart to Norway, Denmark, France, Spain, Sweden, Belgium and the Netherlands.

== Education ==
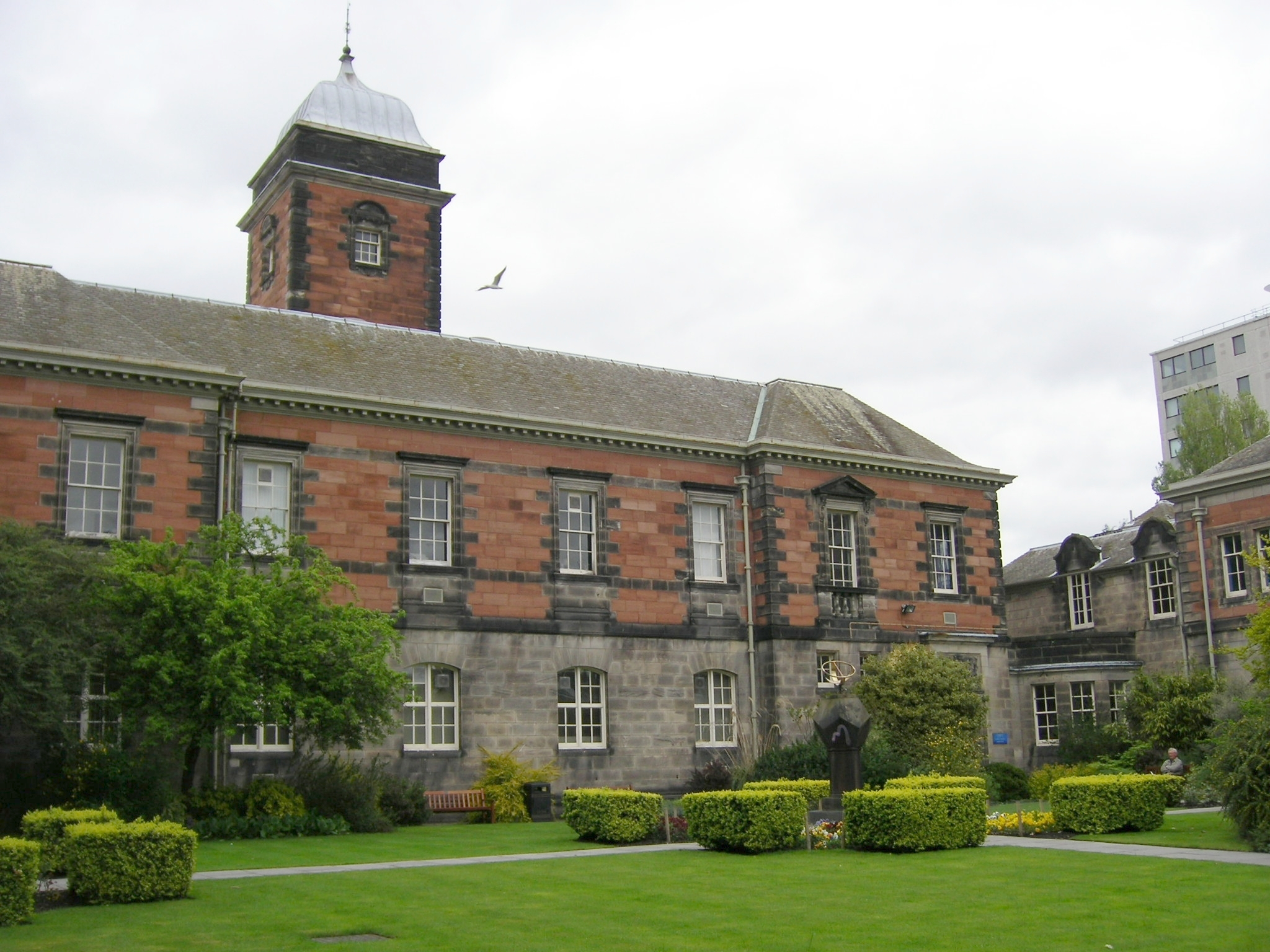
The University of Dundee

Dundee is home to two universities and a student population of approximately 20,000. The University of Dundee became an independent entity in 1967, after 70 years of being incorporated into the University of St Andrews. It was founded in 1881 by Mary Ann Baxter and her distant cousin John Boyd Baxter as University College, Dundee, and teaching began in 1883. It fully merged with the University of St Andrews in 1897 and was reorganised as Queen's College, Dundee in 1954. Significant research in biomedical fields is carried out in the School of Life Sciences. The university is also home to Dundee Law School, situated in the Scrymgeour Building on the main campus and the School of Medicine, based at the city's Ninewells Hospital. The university also incorporates the Duncan of Jordanstone College of Art and Design and the teacher training college.

Abertay University was founded as Dundee Institute of Technology in 1888. Previously, the buildings formed Bell Street Technical College, a further education college. It was granted university status in 1994 under the Further and Higher Education Act 1992. The university is noted for its computing and creative technology courses, particularly in the fields of computer games technology and cyber-security. Notable alumni include David Jones, founder of DMA Design (now known as Rockstar North), Sir Brian Souter, founder of Stagecoach, and Lord Iain McNicol, former General Secretary of the Labour Party.

Dundee College is the city's umbrella further education college, which was established in 1985 as an institution of higher education and vocational training. As of 2013, it merged with Angus College in Arbroath, to become Dundee and Angus College (D&A college). The Al-Maktoum College of Higher Education was established in Dundee in Blackness Road in 2002. It is a research-led institution of higher education which are currently offering programmes accredited by SQA in the study of Islam and Muslims, Arabic language and Islamic Economics and Finance. It is an independent institution. It is named after its patron, Hamdan bin Rashid Al Maktoum.

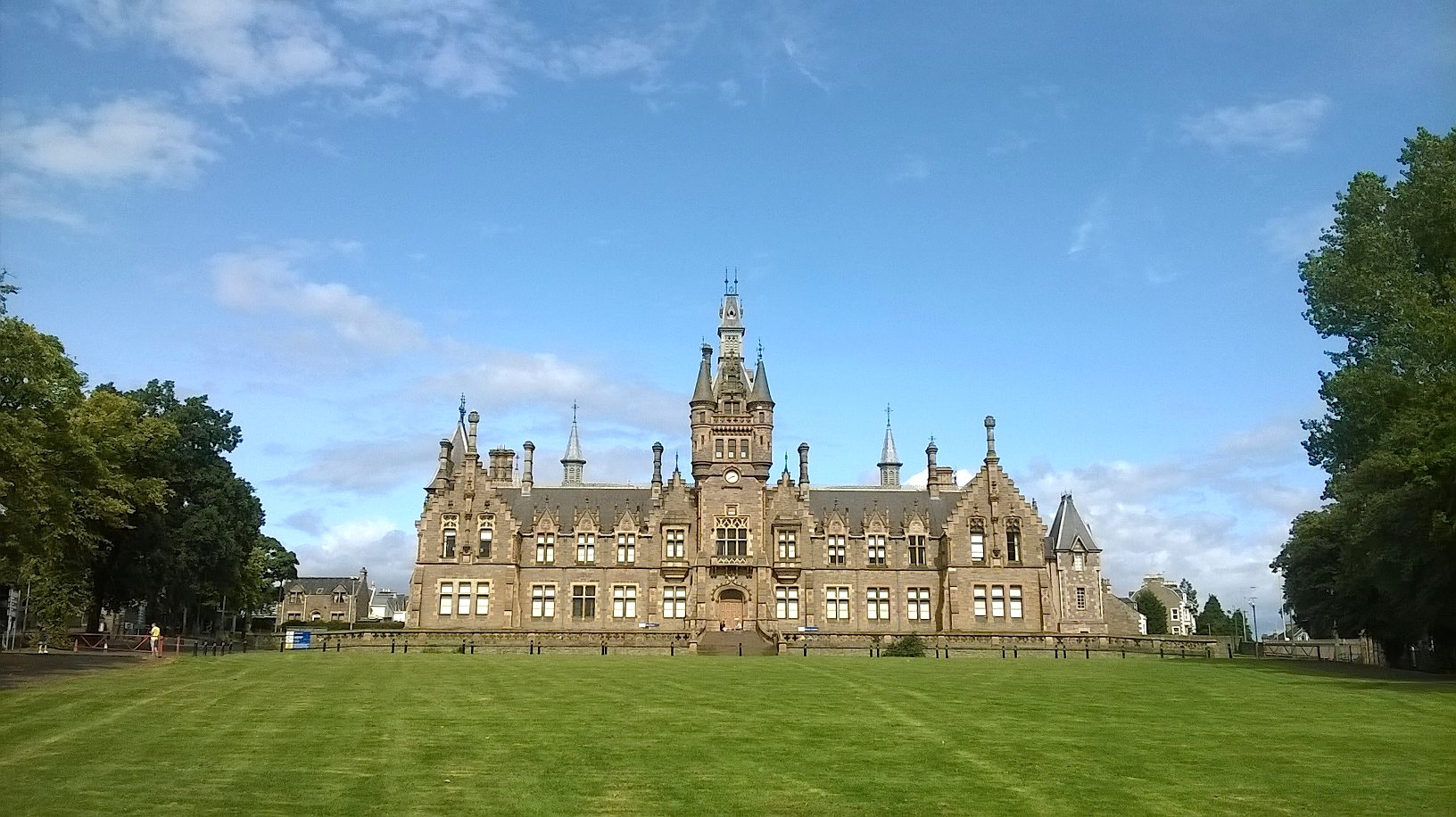
Morgan Academy Dundee

Schools in Dundee have a pupil enrolment of over 20,300. There are 37 primary state schools and 8 secondary state schools in the city. There are 11 primary and 2 secondary Roman Catholic denominational schools which, as in the rest of Scotland, are open to children of all denominations. The remainder are non-denominational. There is also one specialist school that caters for pupils with learning difficulties aged between five and 18 from Dundee and the surrounding area.

Dundee has one independent school, the High School of Dundee, which was founded in the 13th century by the Abbot and monks of Lindores Abbey. The current building was designed by George Angus in a Greek Revival style and built in 1832–34. Notable students in the early modern period included Thomas Thomson, Hector Boece, and the brothers James, John and Robert Wedderburn who were the authors of The Gude and Godlie Ballatis, used early in the Scottish Reformation as a vehicle to spread Protestant theology. According to Blind Harry's largely apocryphal work The Actes and Deidis of the Illustre and Vallyeant Campioun Schir William Wallace, William Wallace was also educated in Dundee.

== Culture ==
Dundee made a bid to be named the 2017 UK City of Culture and on 19 June 2013 was named as one of the four shortlisted cities alongside Hull, Leicester and Swansea Bay. Ultimately, Dundee's bid was unsuccessful, with Hull winning the contest. Dundee came in fifth place in a newspaper survey regarding numbers of cultural venues in the United Kingdom, ahead of other Scottish cities.

In August 2021 Dundee made a joint bid with Perth and Kinross, Angus and Fife for the UK City of Culture again in 2025 under the title of 'Tay Cities'.

Dundee also intended to bid to become the European Capital of Culture in 2023 but owing to the United Kingdom voting to leave the European Union in June 2016 Dundee's bid, along with those of other British cities submitting bids, was discontinued by the European Commission.

=== Museums and galleries ===
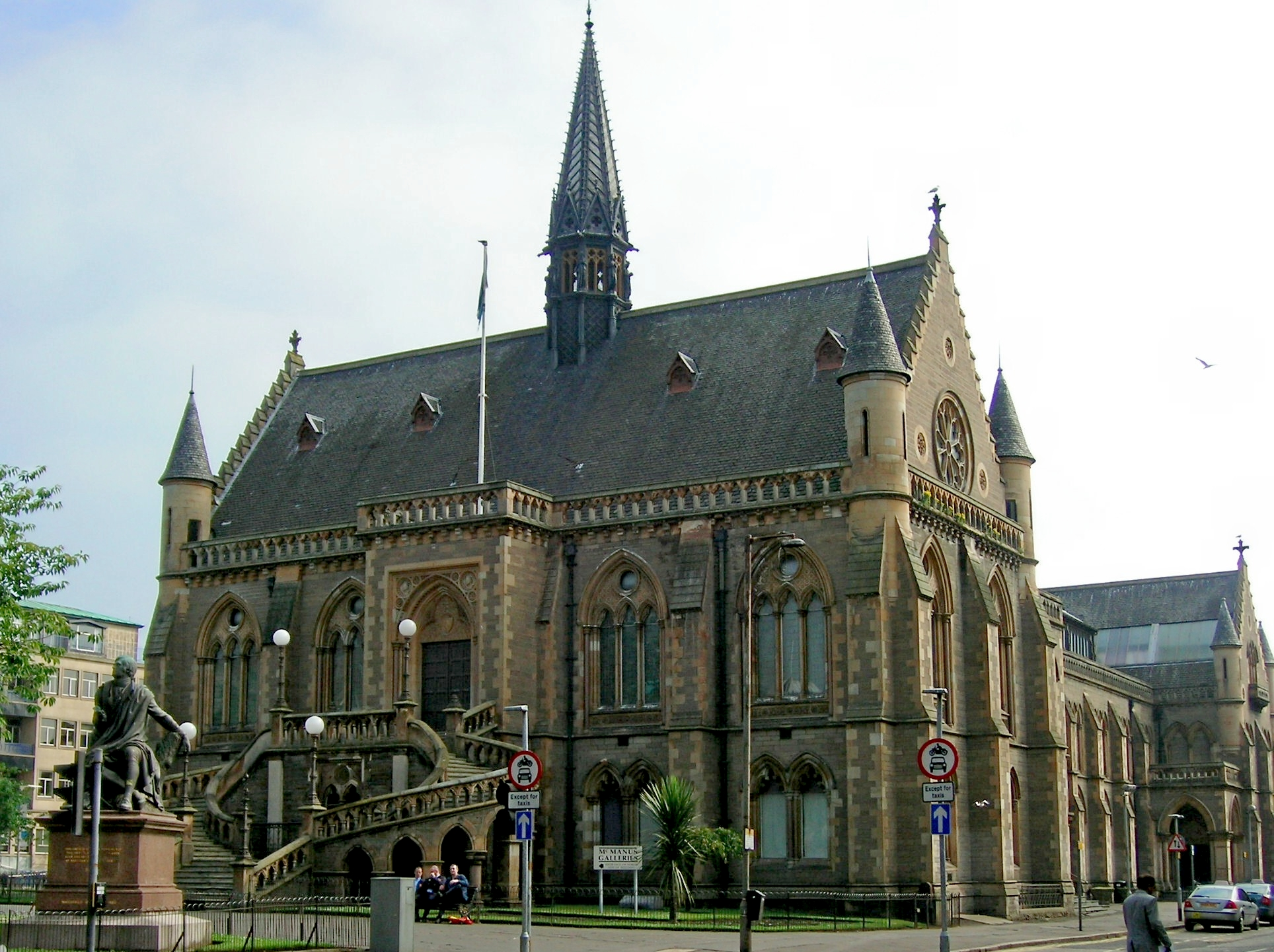
The McManus in the city's Albert Square

The city's main museum and art gallery, The McManus, is in Albert Square. The exhibits include work by James McIntosh Patrick, Alberto Morrocco and David McClure amongst the collection of fine and decorative art, items from Dundee's history and natural history artefacts. Dundee Contemporary Arts (abbreviated DCA) opened in 1999 is an international art centre in the Nethergate close to Dundee Rep, which houses two modern-art galleries, a two-screen arthouse cinema, a print studio, a visual research centre and a café-bar. Britain's only full-time public observatory, Mills Observatory at the summit of the city's Balgay Hill, was given to the city by linen manufacturer and keen amateur scientist John Mills in 1935. Dundee Science Centre in the Greenmarket is a science centre based on the five senses with a series of interactive shows and exhibits. Verdant Works is a museum dedicated to the once dominant jute industry in Dundee and is based in a former jute mill.

The University of Dundee also runs several public museums and galleries, including the D'Arcy Thompson Zoology Museum and the Tayside Medical History Museum. The university, through Duncan of Jordanstone College of Art and Design, also offers the Cooper Gallery for modern art and its archives include: the abcD (artists' books collection Dundee); the REWIND Archive (video art collection); and the Richard Demarco Digital Archive.

The V&A Dundee Museum of Design opened in September 2018 and is built south of Craig Harbour onto the River Tay in a building designed by Kengo Kuma. It was officially opened by the Earl and Countess of Strathearn, in 2019. It is the centrepiece of the city's waterfront redevelopment. The new museum may bring another 500,000 extra visitors to the city and create up to 900 jobs.

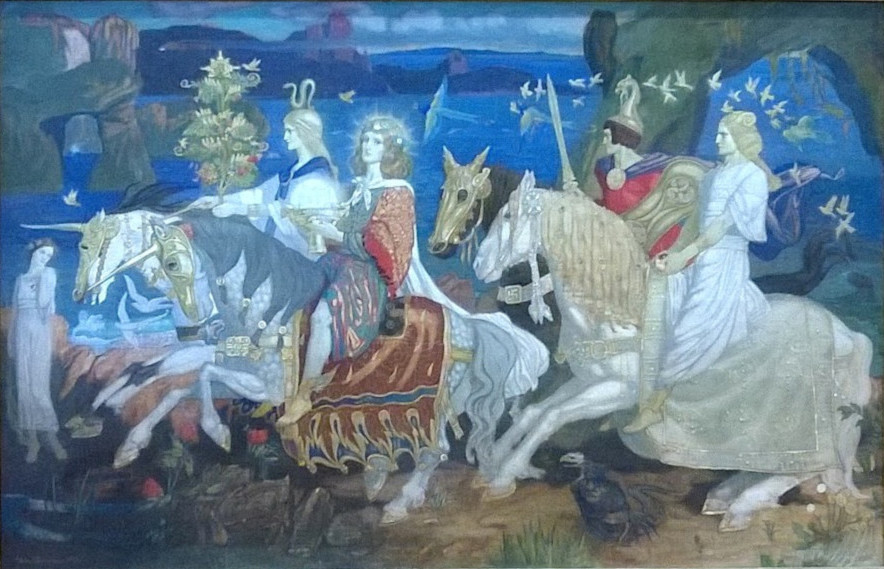
The Riders of the Sidhe in The McManus

The city's archival records are mostly kept by two archives: Dundee City Archives, operated by Dundee City Council and the University of Dundee's Archive Services. Dundee City Archives holds the official records of the city and of the former Tayside Regional Council. The archive also holds the records of various people, groups and organisations connected to the city. The university's Archive Services hold a wide range of material relating to the university and its predecessor institutions and to individuals associated with the university, such as D'Arcy Wentworth Thompson. Archive Services also holds the archives of several individuals, businesses and organisations based in Dundee and the surrounding area. The records held include a substantial number of business archives relating to the jute and linen industry in Dundee; records of other businesses including the archives of the Alliance Trust and the department store G. L. Wilson; the records of the Brechin Diocese of the Scottish Episcopal Church; and the NHS Tayside Archive. The same archive also holds the Michael Peto collection which includes thousands of the photojournalist's photographs, negatives, slides, publications and papers.

=== Literature ===
Dundee has a strong literary heritage, with several authors having been born, lived or studied in the city. These include A. L. Kennedy, Rosamunde Pilcher, Kate Atkinson, Thomas Dick, Mary Shelley, Mick McCluskey, John Burnside and Neil Forsyth. The Dundee International Book Prize is a biennial competition open to new authors, offering a prize of £10,000 and publication by Polygon Books. Past winners have included: Andrew Murray Scott, Claire-Marie Watson and Malcolm Archibald. William McGonagall, regularly cited as the "world's worst poet", worked and wrote in the city, often giving performances of his work in pubs and bars. Many of his poems are about the city and events therein, such as his work The Tay Bridge Disaster.

Dundee's poetic heritage is represented by the 2013 poetry anthology Whaleback City edited by W. N. Herbert and Andy Jackson (Dundee University Press) containing poems by McGonagall, Don Paterson, Douglas Dunn, John Burnside and many others. City of Recovery Press was founded in Dundee, and has become a controversial figure in documenting the darker side of the city.

=== Cinema ===
The Dundee Mountain Film Festival (DMFF), held in the last weekend of November, presents the best presenters and films of the year in mountaineering, mountain culture and adventure sport, along with an art and trade exhibition. DMFF is also one of the members of International Alliance for Mountain Film (IAMF) among other important international mountain film festivals.

Dundee Contemporary Arts hosts an annual horror film festival called Dundead, which started in 2011. It also hosts the Discovery Film Festival, an international film festival targeted for young audiences.

The city also has two Multiplex cinemas, Odeon and Cineworld.

=== Theatre, drama, dance ===
Dundee is home to a full-time repertory ensemble, which originated in 1939. One of its alumni, Hollywood actor Brian Cox, is a native of the city. The Dundee Repertory Theatre, built in 1982, is also the base for the Scottish Dance Theatre company.

The Whitehall Theatre opened in 1969. Dundee is also home to the Thomson-Leng Musical Society, founded in 1964, and the Thomson-Leng Youth Music Theatre, founded in 1998.

The Little Theatre at the foot of the Hilltown is home to and maintained by Dundee Dramatic Society.

=== Music ===
Dundee's principal concert auditorium, the Caird Hall (named after its benefactor, the jute baron James Key Caird) in the City Square regularly hosts the Royal Scottish National Orchestra. Various smaller venues host local and international musicians during Dundee's annual Jazz, Guitar and Blues Festivals. In 2025, LiveHouse Dundee, a new large-scale live music and events venue opened in the former Mecca Bingo hall on the city's Nethergate, expanding Dundee's capacity to host major touring acts, conferences and cultural events.

Dundee has hosted the National Mod a number of times – 1902, 1913, 1937, 1959 and 1974.

Popular music groups such as the 1970s soul-funk outfit Average White Band, the Associates, the band Spare Snare, Danny Wilson, the Hazey Janes, the Indie rock bands the View and the Law, and DJ Hannah Laing are from Dundee. Musician, songwriter and performer Michael Marra was born and raised in Dundee. Ricky Ross of Deacon Blue and singer-songwriter KT Tunstall are former pupils of the High School of Dundee, although Tunstall is not a native of the city. The Northern Irish indie rock band Snow Patrol was formed by students at the University of Dundee. Brian Molko, lead singer of Placebo, grew up in the city as did Ian Cussick, singer of Lake.

Dundee has hosted several music events, including BBC Radio 1's Big Weekend in 2006 and again in 2023 at Camperdown Park in the north-west of the city. The city was due to host the event in 2020, but this was cancelled due to the COVID-19 pandemic. Dundee staged its own music festival, Carnival 56 in 2017, a large outdoor music festival that also took place at Camperdown, although the event was cancelled after one year. From 2025, Dundee began hosting Doof in the Park, an annual electronic music festival held in Camperdown too organised by Dundee DJ Hannah Laing, and has also hosted the Discovery Festival at Slessor Gardens. At the end of June, Dundee hosts an annual blues festival known as the Dundee Blues Bonanza.

=== Media ===
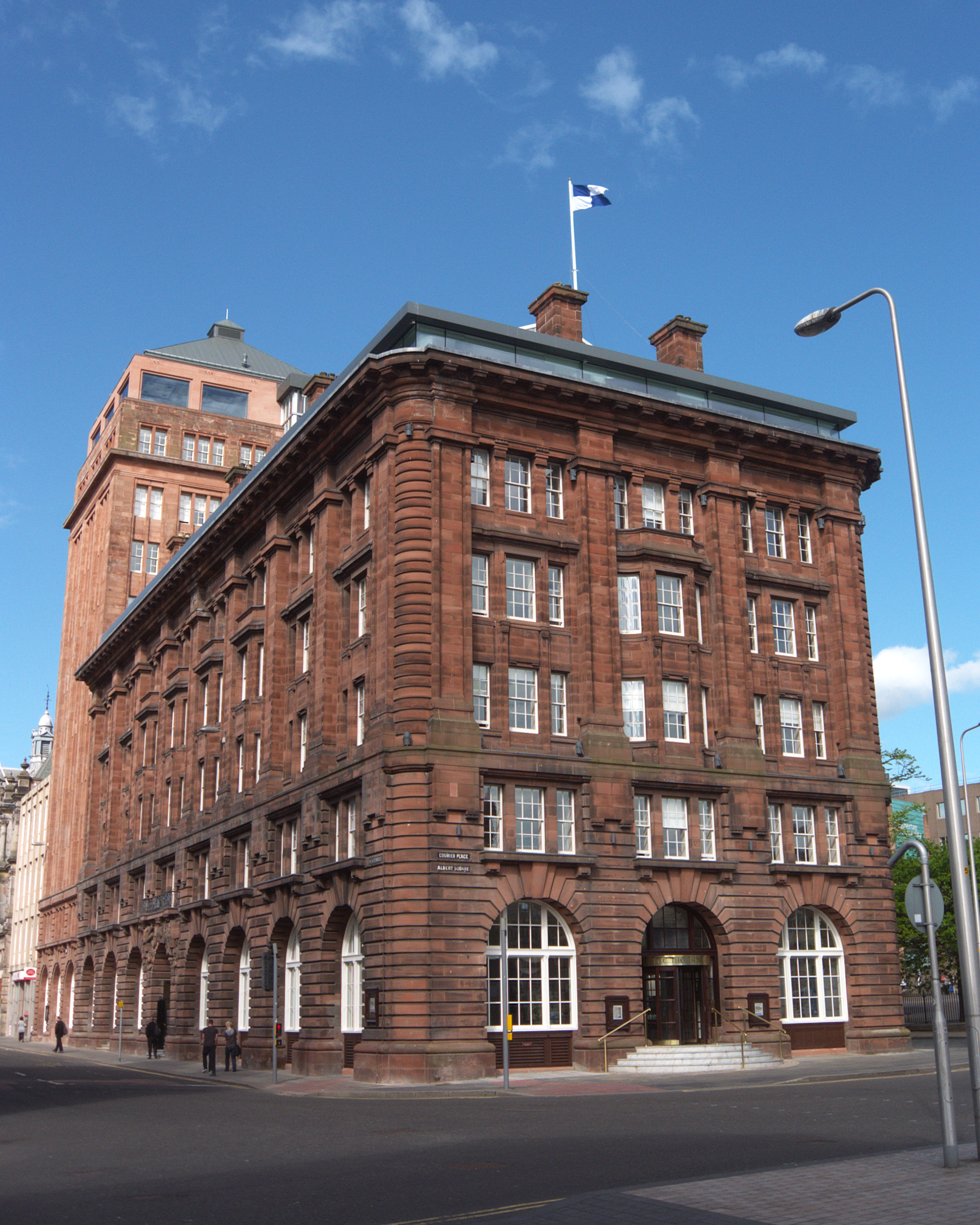
Dundee Headquarters of DC Thomson & Co.

Dundee is home to DC Thomson, established in 1905, which produces over 200 million magazines, newspapers and comics every year; these include The Beano, The Dandy and The Press and Journal.

Dundee was home to one of eleven BBC Scotland broadcasting centres, located within the Nethergate Centre. STV North's Tayside news and advertising operations are based in the Seabraes area of the city, from where an STV News Tayside opt-out bulletin is broadcast, (though not on Digital Satellite), within the nightly regional news programme, STV News at Six. The city also had a community internet TV station called The Dundee Channel which was launched on 1 September 2009.

Dundee formerly had three local radio stations that were based in the city. Radio Tay was launched on 17 October 1980. The station split frequencies in January 1995, launching Tay FM for a younger audience and Tay AM playing classic hits (now called Greatest Hits Radio Tayside & Fife). Neither Tay FM or Greatest Hits Radio are based within the city of Dundee, with their only locally targeted show (Tay FM breakfast) being broadcast from a Bauer studio in Edinburgh. In 1999, Discovery 102 was launched, later to be renamed Wave 102 following a claim by The Discovery Channel that the station could mistakenly be linked to its brand. The station was further rebranded to Wave FM and Pure Radio. The 102FM frequency now carries a relay of Aberdeen-based radio station Original 106 which features news, content and commercials tailored for Tayside.

During the 2020s, Dundee experienced growth in digital media and online publishing, alongside its established broadcast and print sectors. A number of independent digital platforms and community-led outlets expanded their presence, producing content focused on local culture, events and heritage. Dundee-based organisations and creators increasingly used social media and web platforms to promote the city's cultural activity and regeneration, including Dundee Culture, which became one of several digital-first outlets operating within Dundee's evolving media landscape.

=== Landmarks ===
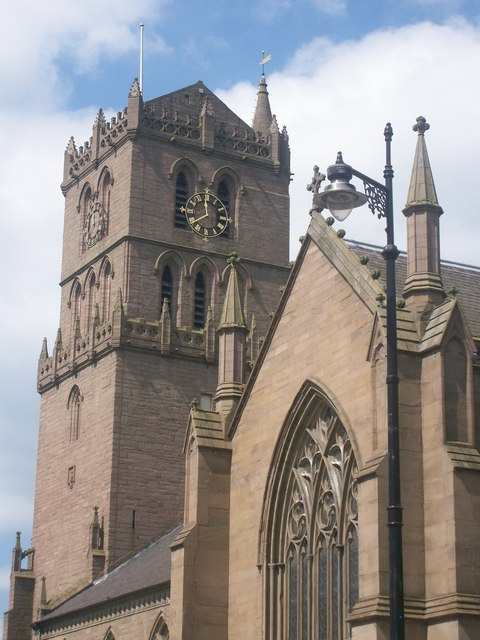
St Mary's Tower, oldest building in Dundee, dating to late 15th century

The city and its landscape are dominated by The Law and the Firth of Tay. The Law, a large hill to the north of the City Centre was the site of an Iron Age Hill Fort, upon which the Law War Memorial, designed by Thomas Braddock, was erected in 1921 to commemorate the fallen of World War I. The waterfront, much altered by reclamation in the 19th century, retains several of the docks that once were the hub of the jute and whaling industries, including the Camperdown and Victoria Docks. The Victoria Dock is the home of the frigate HMS Unicorn and the North Carr Lightship, while Captain Scott's RRS Discovery occupies Craig Pier, from where the ferries to Fife once sailed.

The oldest building in the city is St Mary's Tower, which dates from the late 15th century. This forms part of the City Churches, which consist of St Clement's Church, dating to 1787–8 and built by Samuel Bell, Old St Paul's and St David's Church, built in 1841–42 by William Burn, and St Mary's Church, rebuilt in 1843–44, also by Burn, following a fire. Other significant churches in the city include the Gothic Revival St Paul's Episcopal Cathedral, built by Sir George Gilbert Scott in 1853 on the former site of Dundee Castle in the High Street, and the Catholic St. Andrew's Cathedral, built in 1835 by George Mathewson in Nethergate.

As a result of the destruction suffered during the Rough Wooing, little of the mediaeval city (aside from St Mary's Tower) remains and the earliest surviving domestic structures date from the Early Modern Era. A notable example is the Wishart Arch (or East Port) in Cowgate. It is the last surviving portion of the city walls. Dating from prior to 1548, it owes its continued existence to its association with the Protestant martyr George Wishart, who is said to have preached to plague victims from the East Port in 1544. Another is the building complex on the High Street known as Gardyne's Land, parts of which date from around 1560. The Howff burial ground in the northern part of the City Centre also dates from this time; it was given to the city by Mary Queen of Scots in 1564, having previously served as the grounds of a Franciscan abbey.

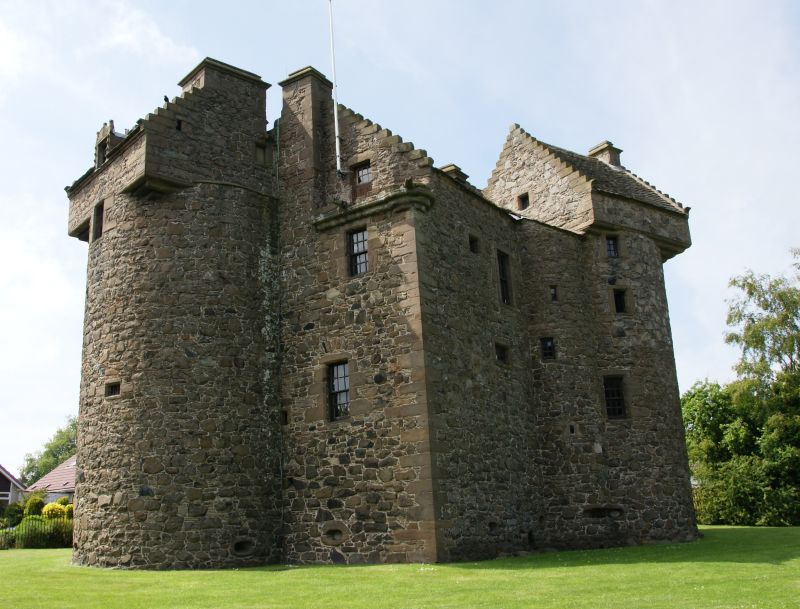
Claypotts Castle, dating from the late 16th century

Several castles can be found in Dundee, mostly from the Early Modern Era. The earliest parts of Mains Castle in Caird Park were built by David Graham in 1562 on the site of a hunting lodge of 1460. Dudhope Castle, originally the seat of the Scrymgeour family, dates to the late 16th century and was built on the site of a keep of 1460. Claypotts Castle, a striking Z plan castle in West Ferry, was built by John Strachan and dates from 1569 to 1588. In 1495 Broughty Castle was built and remained in use as a major defensive structure until 1932, playing a role in the Anglo-Scottish Wars and the Wars of the Three Kingdoms. The castle stands on a shallow tip projecting into the Firth, alongside two beaches, one of sand, the other of pebbles. The ruins of Powrie Castle, north of Fintry, date from the 16th-century.

North of the City Churches, at the end of Reform Street, lies the High School of Dundee, built in 1829–34 by George Angus in a Greek Revival style. Another school building of note is Morgan Academy on Forfar Road, built in 1863, designed by John Dick Peddie in a Dutch Gothic style.

Dundee's industrial history as a centre for textile production is apparent throughout the city. Numerous former jute mills remain standing and while some lay derelict, many have been converted for other uses. Of particular note are the Tay Works, built by the Gilroy Brothers c. 1850–1865, Camperdown Works in Lochee, which built and owned by Cox Brothers, one of Europe's largest jute manufacturing companies, and begun in 1849, and Upper Dens Mill and Lower Dens Works, built by the Baxter Brothers in the mid-19th century.

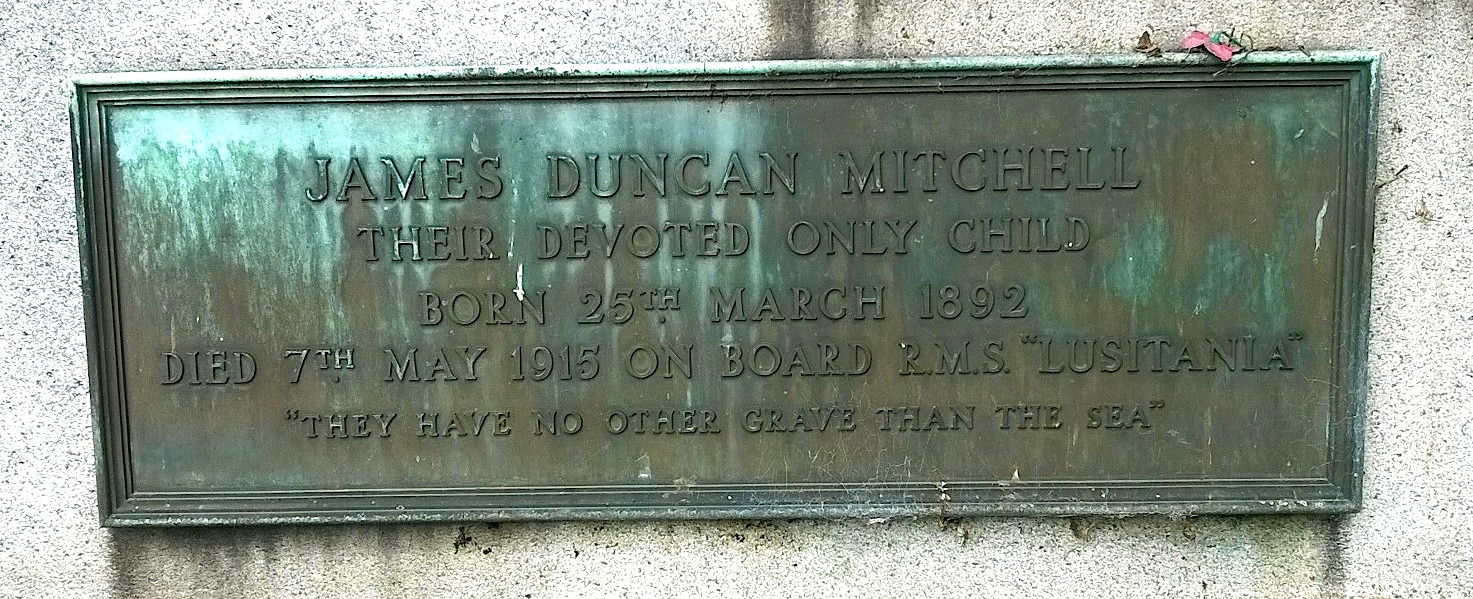
James Duncan Mitchell, died on the Lusitania in 1915, interred at Western Cemetery, Dundee

A more recent landmark is the 140-foot (43 m) Tower Building of the University of Dundee built between 1959 and 1961. At the time of its construction only the Old Steeple was taller in the city. The Tower was built to replace the original college buildings which stood on the site. The building houses the university's main administration and includes galleries and the university's Archive, Records Management and Museum Services.

Many 1960s landmark multi-storey housing buildings were demolished in the late 2000s. The former Tayside House block, nicknamed 'Faulty Towers' by many local people, was demolished in 2013 as part of the waterfront redevelopment program. According to the architectural historian Charles McKean and his co-authors of Lost Dundee, the best views in the city were from Tayside House, because these were the only views from which the building itself could not be seen.

== Sport and recreation ==
=== Football ===
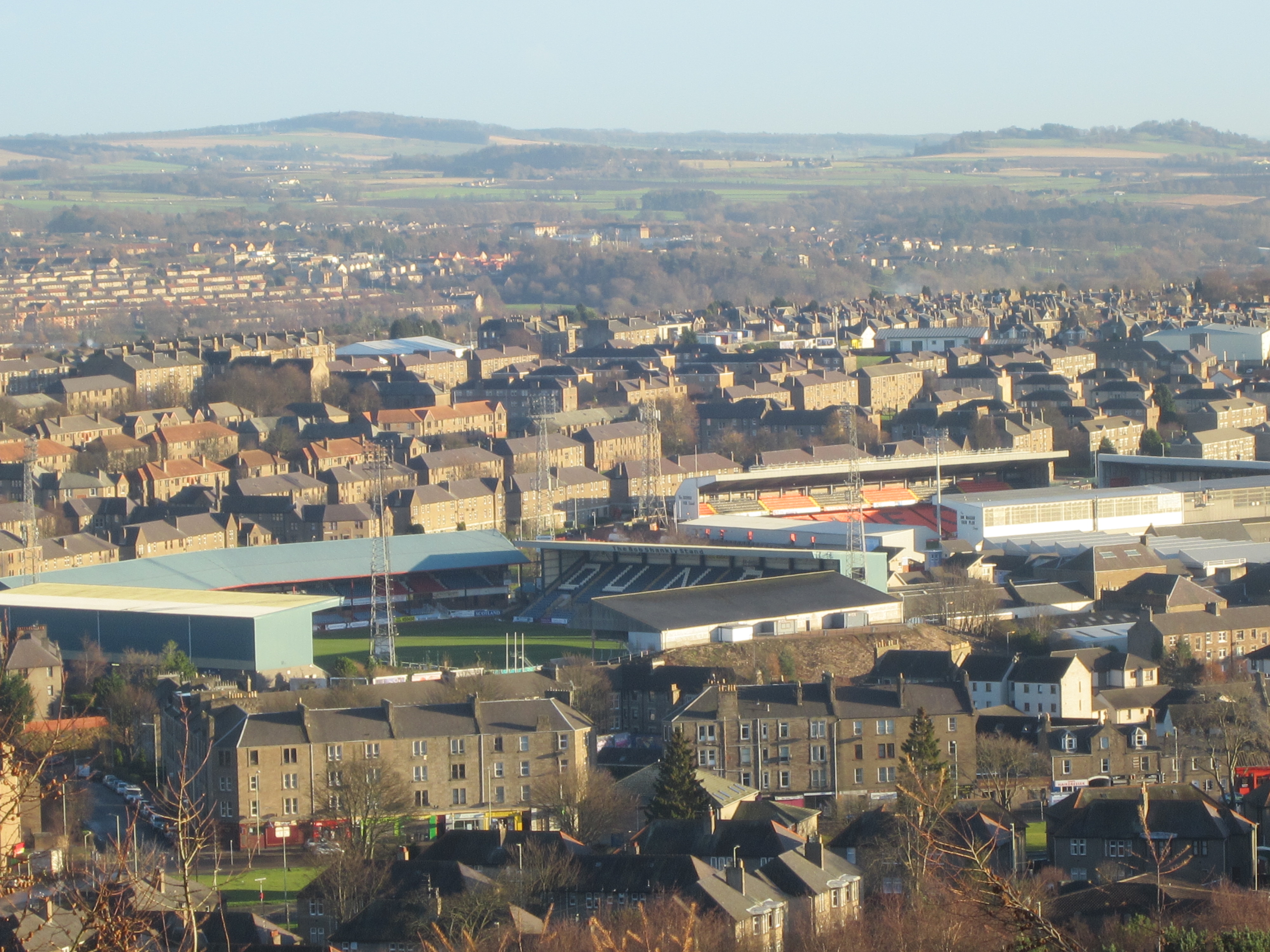
Dens Park and Tannadice Park

Dundee has two professional football clubs: Dundee, founded in 1893, and Dundee United, founded in 1909 as Dundee Hibernian. Dundee FC and Dundee United currently play in the Scottish Premiership. Their grounds Dens Park and Tannadice Park are just 100 metres apart, closer together than any other football stadiums in the UK. The Dundee derby is one of the most highly anticipated fixtures in Scottish football.

Dundee is one of four British cities to have produced two European Cup semi-finalists. Dundee lost to A.C. Milan in 1963 and Dundee United lost to A.S. Roma in 1984. Dundee also reached the semi-finals of the forerunner to the UEFA Cup in 1968 and Dundee United were runners-up in the UEFA Cup in 1987. There are also seven junior football teams in the area: Dundee North End, East Craigie, Lochee Harp, Lochee United, Dundee Violet, Broughty Athletic and Downfield.

=== Ice hockey ===
Dundee Stars, the main ice hockey team, play at the Dundee Ice Arena. The team joined the Elite League in the 2010/2011 season. They are one of three professional ice hockey teams in Scotland, and play against teams from England, Wales and Northern Ireland in the Elite League. In the 2013/2014 season, Dundee Stars won the Gardiner Conference trophy, their only one to date. The majority of the players are from Canada and the United States. Marc LeFebvre is the current head coach and general manager of the Dundee Stars.

There also is an amateur ice hockey team, Dundee Rockets, who play in the Scottish National League.

=== Rugby ===
The city is also home to six rugby union teams. Dundee High School Former Pupils play in Scottish National League Division One, the second tier of Scottish club rugby. The remainder of the teams compete in the Caledonia Regional League – Harris Academy FP play in Caledonia Division One, Morgan Academy FP and Panmure in Caledonia Division Two Midlands, Dundee University Medics and Stobswell in Caledonia Division Three Midlands.

=== Athletics ===
Liz McColgan and Eilish McColgan both hail from Dundee and have been members of the Dundee Hawkhill Harriers athletics club.

=== Other sports ===
Local sports clubs include Dundee Handball Club, Grove Menzieshill Hockey Club; Dundee Wanderers Hockey Club, Dundee Volleyball Club, Dundee Northern Lights Floorball Club, Dundee Hawkhill Harriers, Dundee City Aquatics, Dundee Hurricanes, Dundee Roller Derby and Dundee & Angus Radio Controlled Car Klub (DARCCK).

The Olympia Leisure Centre, opened in 2013, has a swimming pool.

There is a velodrome, Caird Park Velodrome.

== Public services ==
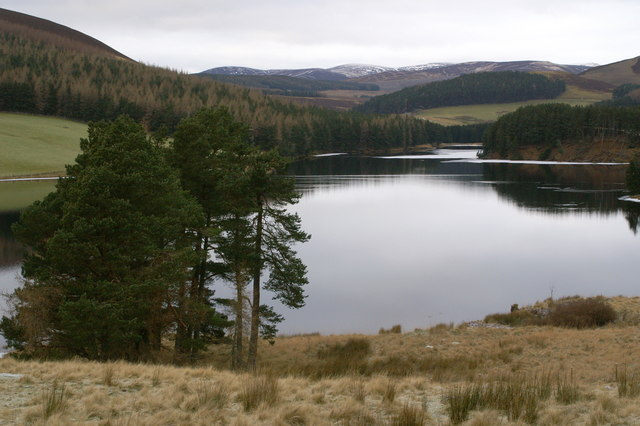
Backwater Reservoir

Dundee and the surrounding area is supplied with water by Scottish Water. Dundee, along with parts of Perthshire and Angus is supplied from Lintrathen and Backwater reservoirs in Glen Isla. Electricity distribution is by Scottish Hydro Electric plc, part of the Scottish and Southern Energy group.

Waste management is handled by Dundee City Council. There is a kerbside recycling scheme that currently only serves 15,500 households in Dundee. Cans, glass and plastic bottles are collected on a weekly basis. Compostable material and non-recyclable material are collected on alternate weeks. Paper is collected for recycling on a four-weekly basis.

Recycling centres and points are at a number of locations in Dundee. Items accepted include steel and aluminium cans, cardboard, paper, electrical equipment, engine oil, fridges and freezers, garden waste, gas bottles, glass, liquid food and drinks cartons, plastic bottles, plastic carrier bags, rubble, scrap metal, shoes and handbags, spectacles, textiles, tin foil, wood and yellow pages. Figures taken in 2008 suggest the city council has a recycling rate of 36.1%.

Law enforcement is provided by Police Scotland. The headquarters of the Dundee Branch of Police Scotland is situated in West Bell Street. There are also four police stations which serve the city: Maryfield, Lochee, Downfield and Longhaugh.

Healthcare is supplied in the area by NHS Tayside. Ninewells Hospital, is the only hospital with an accident and emergency department in the area. Dundee is also served by the East Central Region of the Scottish Ambulance Service which covers the city, Tayside and parts of Fife. There is one ambulance station for the city; on West School Road.

The Scottish Fire and Rescue Service operate three fire stations, covering the city and surrounding villages. The main station is at Blackness Road and there is a control room at Macalpine Road fire station.

== Accidents and disasters ==
In the Mesolithic period, the Storegga Slide (6225–6170 BCE) caused tsunami waves to hit North Sea coastal areas, with wave heights of 3–6 meters in the north east Scotland areas.

The Late Middle Ages and the Early modern period include war time fatalities, such as in the Anglo-Scottish Wars (1296–1603), when the Broughty Castle was recaptured (1550) by French and Scots forces at the cost of 50 men in the Rough Wooing. Later in 1651, as part of the Wars of the Three Kingdoms, 100–1,000 Scots were killed in the Siege of Dundee, led by George Monck as part of the Anglo-Scottish war (1650–1652). After the siege, Monck pillaged and looted Dundee, but his 60 ships wrecked in the Firth of Tay with an unknown number of dead. In 1669, Grissel Jaffray was the last woman to be executed for witchcraft in Dundee.

The 19th century includes shipwrecks on the Abertay Sands, off the mouth of the River Tay; in 1864, the Dalhousie wrecked with the loss of all 24 people on board and in 1865, the Princess wrecked with the death of the crew of five. Further, in 1865, a crowd crush occurred in Bell Street Hall causing the death of 20 people. In 1879, the Tay Bridge disaster occurred during a storm when the first Tay Rail Bridge collapsed as a passenger train was passing, the train sunk in the Firth of Tay. A total of 59 known deaths were reported in the accident.

In the first half of the 20th century, accidents include the 1906 Dundee fire, which has been described as the most destructive fire in the history of Dundee. No deaths were reported. Later, war time fatalities dominated. In World War I (1914–1918), due to the female dominated jute industry limiting male employment, Dundee had one of the highest proportion of serving soldiers, which was reflected in the casualties. In 1940, during World War II, Dundee was bombed by the Luftwaffe, the air raid caused the destroying of a building in Rosefield Street and the death of two people. Dundee International Submarine Memorial commemorates lives lost on submarines operating from Dundee during World War II: HMS Oxley (53 lost), HMS Thames (64 lost), HNLMS O 13 (34 lost), HNLMS O 22 (45 lost), HNoMS Uredd (35 lost) and V1 (51 lost).

The second half of the 20th century includes a maritime accident in 1959, where the eight men crew of the lifeboat Mona drowned as the boat was launched to assist the North Carr Lightship. In 1967, the Dundee school shooting took place at the St John's Roman Catholic High School. A teacher Nanette Hanson was killed in the shooting. In 1979, the Invergowrie rail accident happened, in which five people were killed. In 1979 and 1980, the Templeton Woods murders took place where the bodies of two women were found in Templeton Woods.

In the 21st century, Dundee and Glasgow have had the highest mortality rates in the drug crisis in Scotland.

== Sister cities ==
Chronologically:

- Orléans, France (1946)
- Zadar, Croatia (1959)
- Alexandria, United States (1962)
- Würzburg, Germany (1962)
- Nablus, Palestine (1980)
- Dubai, United Arab Emirates (2004)
- West Dundee, United States (2013)

== Freedom of the City ==
The following people and military units have received the Freedom of the City of Dundee.

=== Individuals ===
- William Arrol: 1889.
- Henry Morton Stanley: 1890.
- William Harcourt: 1898.
- Sir John Leng: 1902.
- Whitelaw Reid: 1906.
- H. H. Asquith: October 1912.
- Emma Grace Marryat: 1918.
- David Middleton Greig: 1920.
- Agnes Husband: 1926.
- Thomas Johnston: 1947.
- Queen Elizabeth the Queen Mother: 1954.
- Maurice McManus: 1981.
- Nelson Mandela: 9 October 1993.
- Aung San Suu Kyi: 2008.
- Ramsay MacDonald
- Stanley Baldwin
- Rev. William Macmillan
- James McLean

=== Military units ===
- The Black Watch (Royal Highland Regiment): 1954.

== See also ==
- Brittle Bone Society, a UK charity established in 1968 in Dundee
- Dundee Museum of Transport
- Notable Dundonians
- Alexander C. Lamb and references to the Lamb Collection, which is held in the City Museum and the Local History Centre of Dundee Central Library
- Battle of Loos for detailed information about the battle
