= A92 road =

Road in Scotland

A92

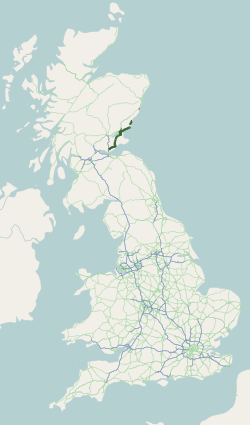

Route information
- Length: 111 mi (179 km)

Major junctions
- South end: M90 Dunfermline

- A909 Cowdenbeath A910 Kirkcaldy A911 Glenrothes A991 Dundee; A90 Stonehaven
- Northeast end: A90 Blackdog

Location
- Country: United Kingdom
- Primary destinations: Dunfermline, Kirkcaldy, Tay Bridge, Dundee, Arbroath, Montrose, Stonehaven, Aberdeen

Road network
- Roads in the United Kingdom; Motorways; A and B road zones
← A91	→ A93

The A92 is a major road that runs through Fife, Dundee, Angus, Aberdeenshire, and Aberdeen City in Scotland. From south to north, it runs from Dunfermline to Blackdog, just north of Aberdeen.

== History ==
The A92's original route in southern Fife is now numbered as the A921, following a largely coastal route through Burntisland and Kirkcaldy. It then headed north-west through Glenrothes and Cupar on the current route of the A91 and A914. The former route connects with the M90 at Junction 1c via Burntisland and Kirkcaldy and links into the Thornton bypass.

The A92 acted as the main trunk road connecting Dundee to Aberdeen until the completion of the A90.

Plans were drawn up in the 1960s for a new East Fife Regional Road starting at the M90 at the Masterton Interchange (Junction 2), which would have mirrored what is now the A921 and B9157 to the Mossgreen area, before heading north-eastward to Chapel Level, connecting up with the Thornton By-pass. The plans were held back until the early 1970s, and were held back further due to the Oil crisis. In 1969 the Scottish Development Department commissioned a new traffic study which concluded that the A92 should follow the more northern route to provide a better link for Cowdenbeath and Lochgelly before connecting directly onto the Thornton Bypass, which was completed by early 1983, and opened on 16 August of that year.

Some of the original plans were for this new road to be a Motorway, but it was decided in the early 1980's to keep it as a high-quality dual carriageway.

The new East Fife Regional Road began construction in 1980, and built over four phases (with the later two brought together):

- Halbeath - Cowdenbeath: Opened on 17 September 1985
- Cowdenbeath - Lochgelly: Opened on 20 August 1987.
- Lochgelly - Chapel Roundabout, and Chapel Roundabout - Redhouse Roundabout (near Thornton): these two sections were bundled together, and were the final phase, which opened on 16 August 1990. This section was officially opened with Sam Torrance driving (a golf ball) down the road.

Fife Regional Council did the design for all the new sections of the East Fife Regional Road, with Tractor Shovels Ltd (later Tractor Shovels Tawse Ltd for the final two sections) carrying out the work.

On 27 March 1998 the A92 was extended beyond the Crossgates junction to provide direct access with the M90 southbound, using south facing free-flow slip roads between M90 and A92 East Fife Regional Road, to ease congestion around the Halbeath interchange. The new section had works beginning in August 1996, and was built three months ahead of schedule, costing £8.4m.

The Bankhead Roundabout, at the edge of Glenrothes, was built in 1993. The junction is flared to allow for an A92 flyover to be built, but this has never been done.

North of Glenrothes, from the New Inn Roundabout, to Forgan Roundabout near Woodhaven, the A914 and A92 road numbers were swapped in 1996, and thus completely bypassing Cupar. The A92 now follows the dualled approach to the Tay Road Bridge, both opened in 1966. Prior to the opening of the Tay Road Bridge, the A92 continued along what is now the B995, along Cupar Road into Newport on Tay. The A92 ended perpendicular to the River Tay when it reached the shoreline at Tay Street / High Street. Thus, traffic that was bound for the Tay Ferry and the rest of the A92 across the river therefore had to use a short section of the A914 to continue its journey.

The junction in Dundee with the B978 , near Claypotts Castle, was previously a roundabout, but was substantially rebuilt in the 1990s to provide a new dualled alignment for the A92 through the junction. From here to Arbroath, at the Elliot Roundabout, was dualled in 2005. In Arbroath, there is currently works to narrow the dual carriageway road, to provide more space for active travel options.

Designed by Tayside Regional Council, and built by Torith Civil Engineering, the Inverkeilor bypass opened in 1989. There was also a straightening of the road at Hawkhill and Courthill bends, to avoid an accident blackspot near Lunan in 2012/2013.

The bridge over the South Esk at Montrose was replaced in December 2005, after it was deemed to be failing.

In February 1997, the relief road for Montrose, taking traffic away from the town centre, was opened. The A92 now follows this route.

There is a very short section of dual carriageway, about 1/4 of a mile long, built above Gourdon by Tractor Shovels, and opened in 1972.

=== Numbering ===
The A92 formerly continued north from Stonehaven through Aberdeen, and terminated at Fraserburgh. The section between Stonehaven and Aberdeen was renumbered A90 in 1994. Upon completion of the Aberdeen Western Peripheral Route (AWPR) in 2018, the section between Stonehaven and Blackdog was once again numbered as A92. The section between Blackdog and Fraserburgh has now been renumbered A90 and A952.

The section of the A92 between Dundee and Aberdeen was formerly part of the Euroroute system, on route E120, a closed loop connecting Inverness, Aberdeen, Dundee and Perth.

== Route ==
Starting at its junction with the M90 motorway, at the Halbeath Junction (junction 3 of the M90) on the east of Dunfermline, it runs north east past Cowdenbeath, Lochgelly, Kirkcaldy. From the Redhouse Roundabout, just north of Dysart, it heads in a much more northernly direction through Glenrothes, and then bypassing Freuchie, Ladybank and Newport-on-Tay. The road is a dual carriageway from the M90 to Glenrothes town centre, changing to a single carriageway at the Preston Roundabout, as it passes through the northern side of the town, before switching back to dual carriageway north of Glenrothes near Balfarg (i.e. until it meets the A912 towards Perth and the A914 towards St Andrews). Again, it reverts to a single carriageway at the New Inn roundabout, just south of Freuchie, until a few miles short of the Tay Road Bridge at Dundee. The section through Fife is often described as the East Fife Regional Road.

The road then travels across the Tay Road Bridge, the A92 travels along the south of Dundee, briefly merging with other roads. At the Scott Fyffe Roundabout in the Craigie area of Dundee, the road continues along the east coast bypassing Monifieth, Carnoustie and Muirdrum. When it reaches Arbroath, it becomes the main trunk road heading north along the coast. Skirting Inverkeilor, the road continues as the main trunk road through Montrose and St Cyrus, before skirting Benholm and Johnshaven. It then enters through Inverbervie, Roadside of Kinneff and Roadside of Catterline, before passing the Fowlsheugh Nature Reserve and then reaching the outskirts of Stonehaven where the road once again becomes dual carriageway. From here, the A92 runs parallel with the A90 for around 2 miles. The road then continues past Stonehaven, Muchalls, Newtonhill, and Portlethen heading into the city of Aberdeen at the Bridge of Dee. The road heads in a northernly direction through Aberdeen, to the west of the city centre. At Persley, it turns east, heading towards Bridge of Don. It then heads north for about three miles, before terminating at Blackdog, where the road once again merges with the A90.

The 16-mile section of the road from Dundee to Arbroath was upgraded to dual carriageway standard in 2005 and significantly improved both the safety of the route and the journey time between the two towns. Between Arbroath and Stonehaven the road is a single carriageway apart from a very short section of dual carriageway near Gourdon. The road returns to dual carriageway from Stonehaven heading north to Aberdeen, briefly returning to single carriageway at the Bridge of Dee, and then again returning to single carriageway between the Haudagain and Parkway roundabouts in Aberdeen. The remainder of the road from the Parkway roundabout to the termination point at Blackdog is dual carriageway.

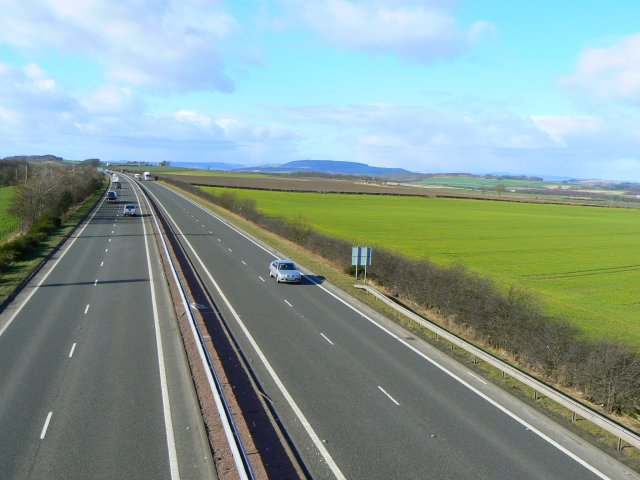
A92 looking west

== Changes ==
In 2024, work began to reduce the A92 within Arbroath to single-carriageway as part a remodelling that will see a dedicated cycle path and additional green space added.

== Archaeological ==
The A92 road traverses lands on which prehistorical archaeological sites are present. Examples of these features include Gourdon Hill and the Stone of Morphie, both situated slightly to the west of the A92 alignment.

== Junction list ==
Council area	Location	mi	km	Destinations	Notes
Fife	Halbeath	0.0	0.0	M90 – The South, The North, Edinburgh, Perth A907 west / Sanderling Way – Dunfermline, Duloch Park	Southern terminus; eastern terminus of A907; M90 junction 3
Fife	Crossgates boundary	0.4– 0.8	0.64– 1.3	M90 south – Edinburgh; B925 (Dunfermline Road) – Crossgates	No access to M90 north or from M90 south; M90 junction 2A
Fife	Cowdenbeath boundary	2.6– 3.0	4.2– 4.8	A909 – Burntisland, Cowdenbeath	Junction
Fife		4.8– 5.3	7.7– 8.5	B9149 – Lochgelly	Junction
Fife	Kirkcaldy boundary	8.1– 8.6	13.0– 13.8	A910 south / B981 – Kirkcaldy West, Cardenden	Junction; northern terminus of A910
Fife		11.1	17.9	A921 south / B9130 – Kirkcaldy East & Central, Thornton	Northern terminus of A921
Fife	Glenrothes	14.9	24.0	A911 / Woodside Way – Glenrothes, Leslie, Leven, Buckhaven, Methil, Milnathort	Milnathort signed northbound only
Fife		17.7	28.5	A912 northwest / A914 north to A91 – Falkland, Auchtermuchty, Strathmiglo, Kingskettle, Pitlessie, Perth, Cupar, St Andrews	To A91 and Perth signed northbound only; southeastern terminus of A912; southern terminus of A914
Fife		22.5	36.2	A91 to M90 – Kincardine Bridge, St Andrews, Auchtermuchty, Cupar, Springfield	
Fife		26.0	41.8	A913 to A91 – Newburgh, Perth, Cupar, St Andrews	Brief concurrency
Fife		35.1	56.5	A914 south / B995 to A919 – St Andrews, Newport, Cupar	Cupar signed southbound only; northern terminus of A914
Fife– Dundee boundary	Newport-on-Tay– Dundee boundary	36.4– 37.9	58.6– 61.0	Tay Road Bridge over Firth of Tay	
Dundee	Dundee	37.8– 38.0	60.8– 61.2	A991 to A90 / A85 / A923 – Perth, Coupar Angus	Information signed northbound only
Dundee	Dundee	38.2	61.5	A991 to A923 – Coupar Angus, Tay Bridge	Tay Bridge signed northbound only
Dundee	Dundee	39.4	63.4	A930 east (Broughty Ferry Road) – Port of Dundee, Broughty Ferry, Monifieth	Monifieth signed northbound only; western terminus of A930
Dundee	Dundee	39.9	64.2	A972 west (Kingsway East) / Arbroath Road (B959) / Douglas Road (B961) / Strips of Craigie Road to A90 – Forfar, Aberdeen, Perth, Stobswell, Douglas and Angus, Whitfield, Mid-Craigie, Angus Cty	Perth signed northbound only, B959, Stobswell, Mid-Craigie and Angus Cty southbound only
Angus		44.9– 45.1	72.3– 72.6	B962 – Monikie, Newbigging, Monifieth	Junction
Angus	Upper Victoria	47.1– 47.2	75.8– 76.0	Carnoustie, Barry	Junction
Angus	Muirdrum	48.8– 48.9	78.5– 78.7	A930 west / B9128 – Carnoustie, Forfar, Muirdrum	Junction; eastern terminus of A930
Angus	Salmond's Muir	50.2– 50.4	80.8– 81.1	Easthaven, Hatton, Balmirmer	Junction
Angus	Arbroath	53.3	85.8	Westway to A933 – Montrose, Brechin, Forfar	
Angus	Arbroath	55.0	88.5	A933 north / Guthrie Port to A932 – Town centre, Brechin, Forfar	Southern terminus of A933
Angus		65.6	105.6	A934 west to B9113 – Forfar	Eastern terminus of A934
Angus	Montrose	67.6	108.8	A935 west (Medicine Well Drive) – Brechin	Eastern terminus of A935
Angus	Montrose	68.4	110.1	A937 north (Coronation Avenue) – Laurencekirk, Hillside	Hillside signed northbound only; southern terminus of A937
Aberdeenshire	Stonehaven boundary	88.6	142.6	A957 north – Stonehaven, Banchory	Banchory signed southbound only; southern terminus of A957
Aberdeenshire	Stonehaven boundary	88.6– 8.91	142.6– 14.34	A90 south – Perth, Dundee, Forfar	Southern terminus of A90 concurrency
Aberdeenshire	Stonehaven boundary	91.2– 92.0	146.8– 148.1	A90 north / B979 to A96 – Inverness, Aberdeen (N & W), Stonehaven	Junction; To A96 and Inverness signed northbound only; northern terminus of A90 concurrency
Aberdeenshire	Newtonhill	95.9– 96.1	154.3– 154.7	Newtonhill, Chapelton, Cookney	Junction
Aberdeenshire	Portlethen	98.4– 98.7	158.4– 158.8	Portlethen	Junction
Aberdeenshire		99.8– 100.0	160.6– 160.9	Portlethen, Marywell, Findon	Junction
Aberdeen		100.6– 101.4	161.9– 163.2	A956 to A90 north / A96 – Aberdeen, Inverness	Junction; City centre signed for Aberdeen northbound
Aberdeen	Aberdeen	104.1	167.5	A93 (Great Western Road) – City centre (S & W), Braemar	
Aberdeen	Aberdeen	104.7	168.5	A9119 (Queen's Road) to A90 / A96 / A944 – City centre (W), Alford	
Aberdeen	Aberdeen	105.7	170.1	A944 (Lang Stracht / Westburn Road) to A90 / A96 – City centre (N & W), Inverness, Alford	
Aberdeen	Aberdeen	107.2– 107.3	172.5– 172.7	A96 to A90 – City centre, Inverness	
Aberdeen	Bridge of Don	110.6	178.0	A956 south / Parkway East – City centre (N)	Route signed southbound only; northern terminus of A956
Aberdeenshire		113.1	182.0	A90 to A93 / A944 / A947 – Aberdeen (S & W), Inverness, Fraserburgh, Peterhead, Potterton, Blackdog, Braemar, Alford, Banff	Northern terminus
1.000 mi = 1.609 km; 1.000 km = 0.621 mi
