= A991 road =

Ring road in Dundee, Scotland

A991

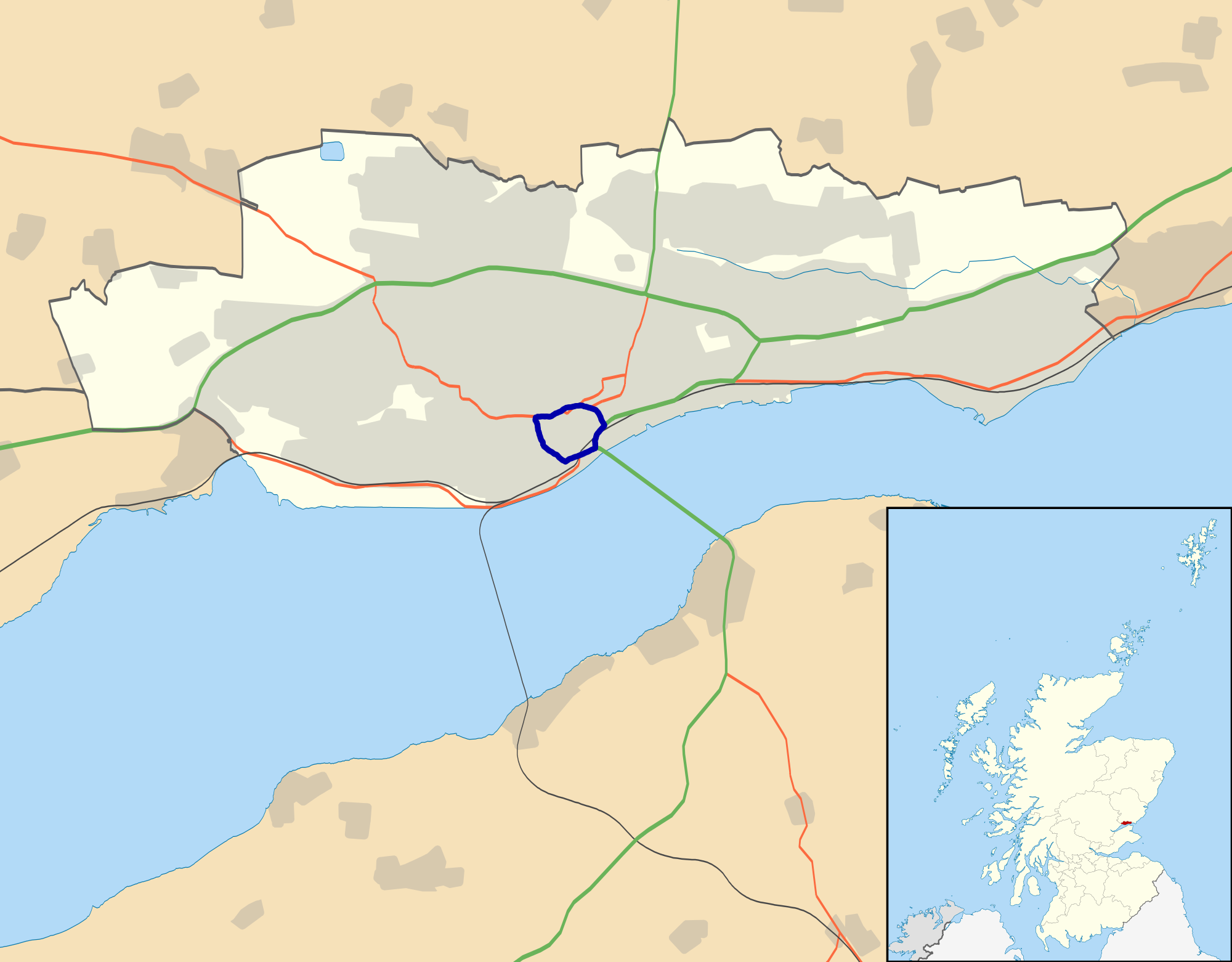

Route information
- Length: 1.85 mi (2.98 km)

Major junctions
- A92 A929 A923; A85

Location
- Country: United Kingdom
- Primary destinations: Dundee

Road network
- Roads in the United Kingdom; Motorways; A and B road zones

The A991 is a major road in Dundee, Scotland. It forms the Inner Ringroad that circles the perimeter of Dundee's city centre.

== Route ==
The A991 previously formed a complete dual-carriageway circle of the city centre. However, the southern section of the ringroad, where it is named South Marketgait, has undergone major reconstruction as part of the city's waterfront redevelopment scheme. Previously, the A991 met the A85 at the Riverside roundabout, beside Dundee Railway Station; and just to the east, the A92 at a grade-separated junction at the northern terminus of the Tay Road Bridge. As of 2015, this has been replaced by a grid scheme of streets, with the east and westbound carriageways of the A991 now separate streets. Major realignment has also taken place of the on- and off-ramps of the Tay Bridge. Travelling west on the A991 from East Dock Street to West Marketgait now requires driving three sides of a rectangle, passing below the northmost span of the Tay Road Bridge.

The rest of the A991 is still dual-carriageway. Travelling clockwise from the railway station, the A991 is known as West Marketgait between there and the West Port Roundabout. Past the West Port Roundabout, in the section known as Marketgait, the road goes North to the Dudhope Roundabout, the southeast terminus of the A923, then east to the Ladywell Roundabout after which it goes through a tunnel under the A929 (Victoria Road) and curves southeast to the East Port Roundabout. South from here, East Marketgait meets South Marketgait at the signal-controlled East Dock Street junction. The A991 then multiplexes with the A92 back to the Tay Road Bridge northern terminus.

== Main Junctions ==
- A85 Riverside Drive, which leads to the westbound A90 at the Swallow Roundabout.
- Dudhope Roundabout – links the A923 Dunkeld road, which passes through Lochee, Birkhill, Coupar Angus and Blairgowrie.
- Ladywell Roundabout – links the A929, which leads to the north-going A90 Aberdeen and Fraserburgh road. The A90 from Dundee to Forfar was formerly numbered as the A929.
- East Dock Street junction – links the eastbound A92 coastal road.
- Tay Road Bridge – the southbound A92 towards Fife.
