= A85 road =

Major road in Scotland

A85

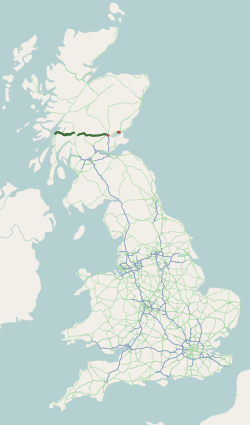

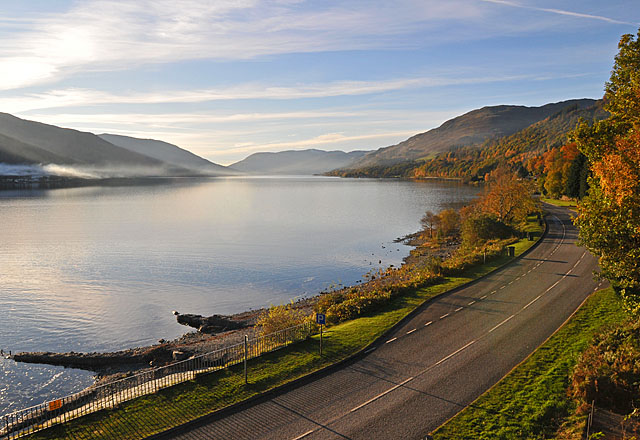
- The A85 following Loch Earn near St Fillans

Route information
- Length: 114.8 mi (184.8 km)

Major junctions
- West end: A816 in Oban

- A828 in Connel; A82 near Tyndrum; A84 in Lochearnhead; A9 in Perth; M90 / A90 in Perth

- East end: A991 in Dundee

Location
- Country: United Kingdom
- Primary destinations: Oban, Crianlarich, Lochearnhead, Perth

Road network
- Roads in the United Kingdom; Motorways; A and B road zones
← A84	→ A86

The A85 is a major road in Scotland. It runs east from Oban along the south bank of Loch Etive, through Lochawe and Tyndrum, Crianlarich, Lochearnhead, St Fillans and Crieff before passing through Perth, where it crosses the River Tay via Perth Bridge (West Bridge Street) to Bridgend. Its name between Crieff and Perth is the Crieff Road. It then runs concurrently with the A90 to the Swallow Roundabout, before diverging to follow the Invergowrie Bypass, Riverside Avenue and Riverside Drive before terminating in Dundee city centre.

The A90 road from Perth to Dundee was previously numbered A85; on opening of an upgraded A94 to Aberdeen the A90 number was continued across the Friarton Bridge (previously M85) and on to the A85 route, then from Swallow Roundabout to Aberdeen. The Perth-Dundee stretch was formerly part of the Euroroute system, of route E120 which ran in a circular route between Inverness, Aberdeen, Dundee and Perth.

Between Tyndrum and Crianlarich the road runs concurrently with the A82, where it merges with the main north–south road. Parts follow an old military road. In Oban, it connects with the A816 road.

Some statistics seem to show that the stretch of the A85 between Oban and Tyndrum is among the ten most dangerous roads in Scotland.

== Gallery ==
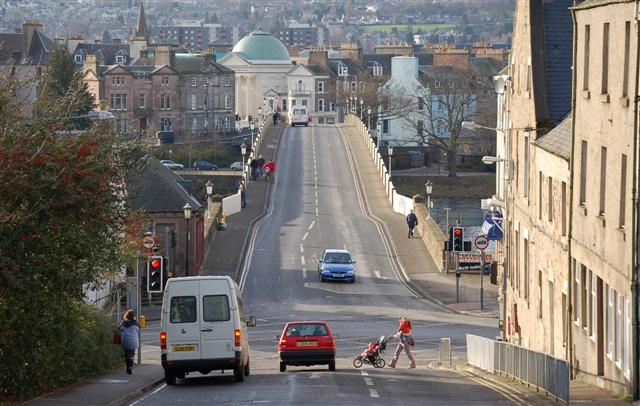
The A85 crossing Perth Bridge between Perth and Bridgend, looking west from Bridgend

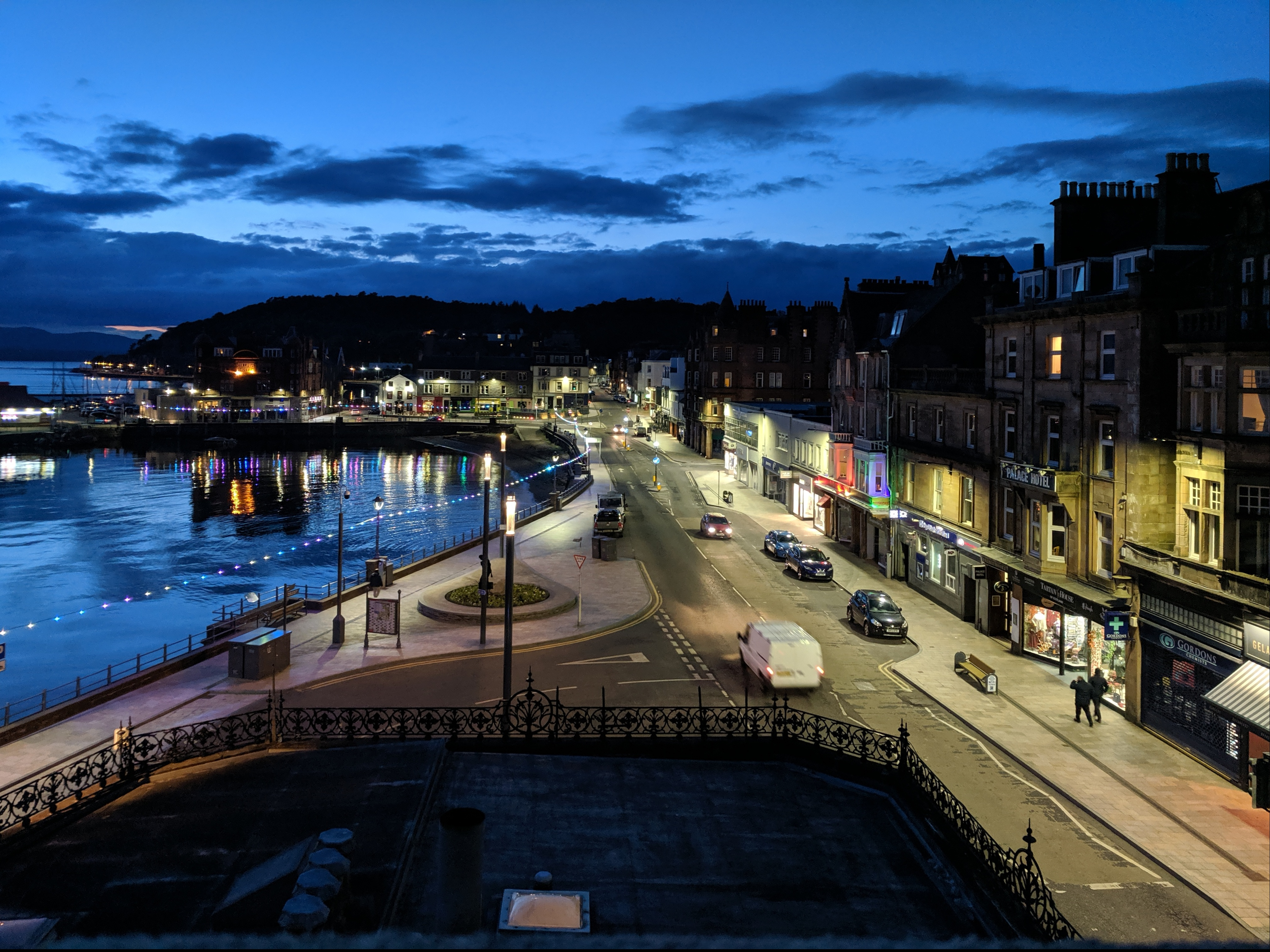
The A85 in Oban at blue hour

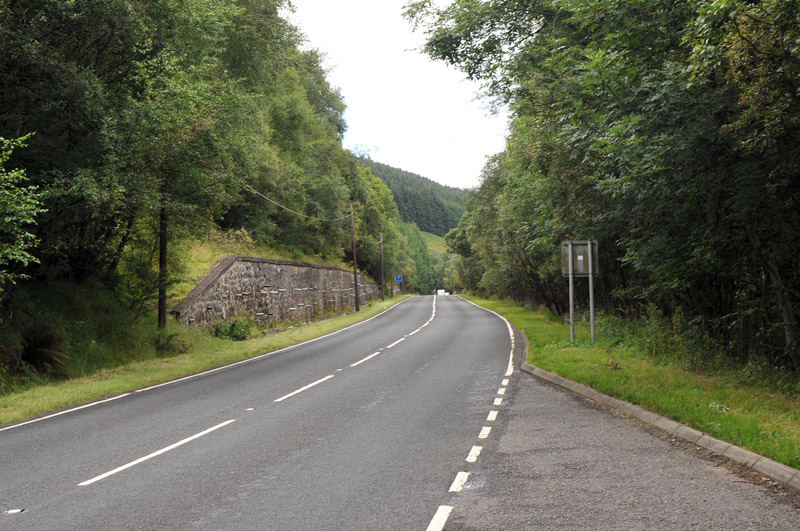
The A85 near Crianlarich in the Stirling Council Area

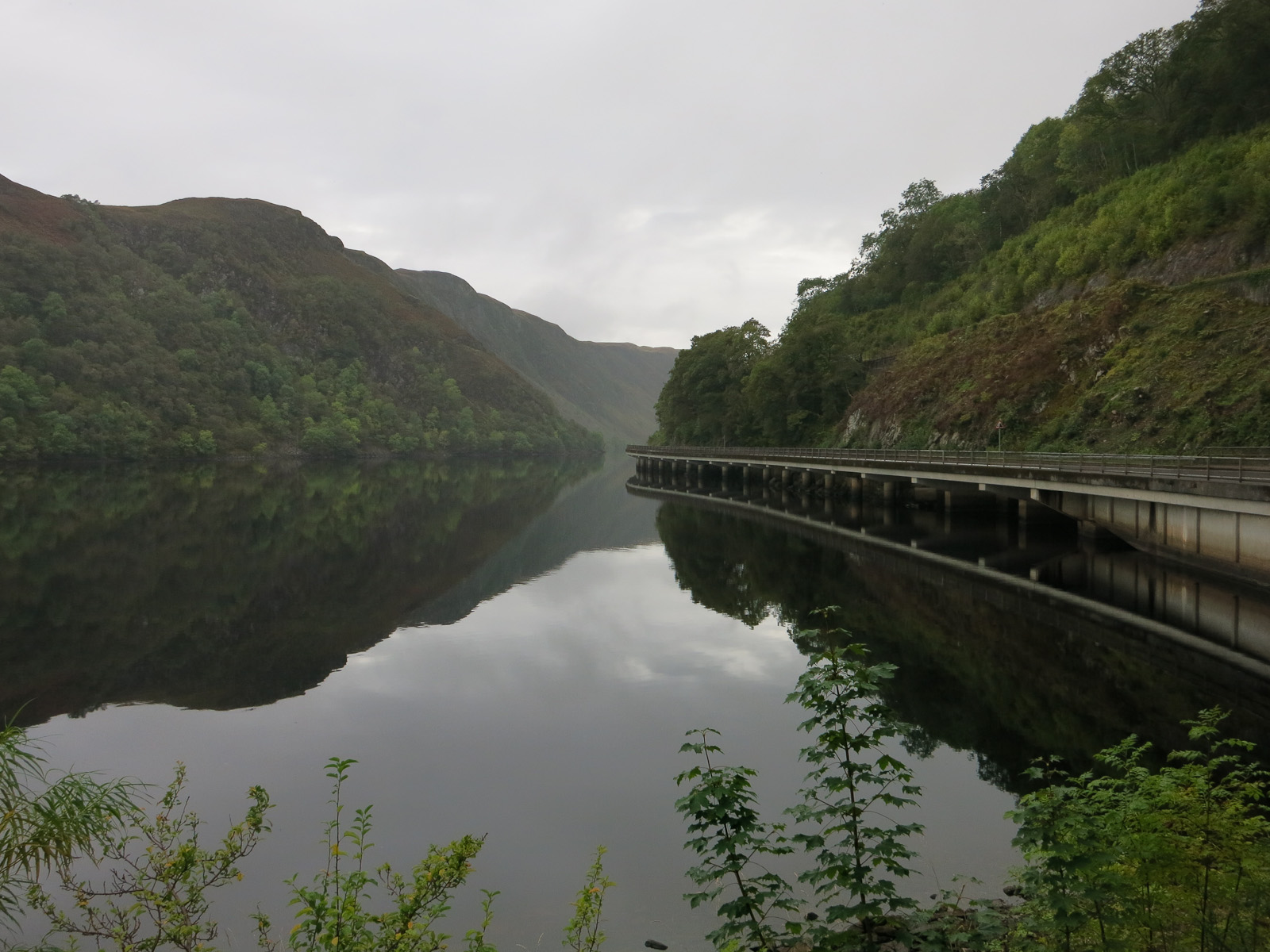
The A85 cantilevered over Loch Awe, Argyll and Bute

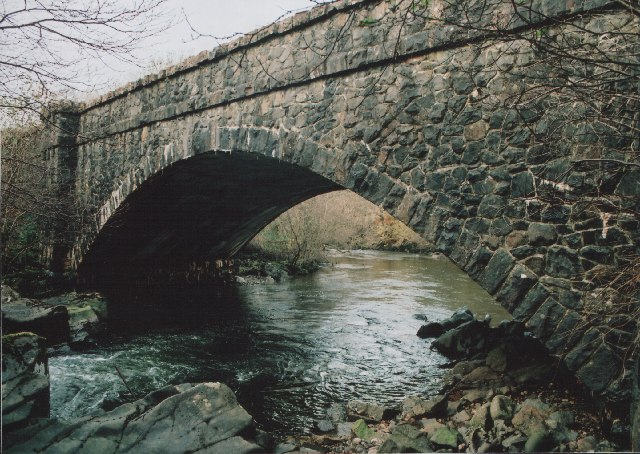
A bridge in Inverlochy, Lochaber

== Junction list ==
Council area	Location	mi	km	Destinations	Notes
Argyll and Bute	Oban	0.0	0.0	A816 south / Shore Street to A83 – Campbeltown, Lochgilphead, Lochavulinn	Western terminus; northern terminus of A816
Argyll and Bute	Connel	4.9	7.9	A828 north to A82 – Fort William, Airport	Southern terminus of A828
Argyll and Bute		22.9	36.9	A819 south to B840 – Inveraray, Cladich	To B840 and Cladich signed westbound only; northern terminus of A819
Stirling		35.7	57.5	A82 north – Fort William	Western terminus of A82 concurrency
Stirling	Crianlarich	40.5	65.2	A82 south – Glasgow	Eastern terminus of A82 concurrency
Stirling		51.8	83.4	A827 northeast – Killin	Southwestern terminus of A827
Stirling	Lochearnhead	56.8	91.4	A84 south – Stirling, Callander	Northern terminus of A84
Perth and Kinross	Crieff	75.7	121.8	A822 south (Burrell Street) – Stirling	Some access via Lodge Street; Western terminus of A822 concurrency
Perth and Kinross		77.8	125.2	A822 north (Highland Road) to A826 – Dunkeld, Aberfeldy, Monzie	Eastern terminus of A822 concurrency
Perth and Kinross	Perth	90.8– 91.1	146.1– 146.6	A9 to M90 – Inverness, Stirling, Glasgow, Dundee	Glasgow and Dundee signed eastbound only; junction on A9
Perth and Kinross	Perth	92.5	148.9	A912 northwest to Inchaffray Street / A9 – Inverness	Southeastern terminus of A912
Perth and Kinross	Perth	92.9	149.5	Caledonian Road (A989) to A9 – Stirling, Glasgow	Information signed eastbound only; western terminus of A989 concurrency
Perth and Kinross	Perth	93.3– 93.7	150.2– 150.8	A93 (A989 / Main Street / Tay Street) to A94 – Blairgowrie, Coupar Angus	Eastern terminus of A989 concurrency
Perth and Kinross	Perth boundary	95.0– 95.6	152.9– 153.9	M90 (A90 south) – Edinburgh, Stirling, Glasgow, Crianlarich, Inverness	Western terminus of A90 concurrency
Perth and Kinross		95.9	154.3	Kinfauns Castle	Junction; eastbound exit and entrance
Perth and Kinross		95.9	154.3	West Kinfauns, Walnut Grove, The Holdings	Junction; westbound exit and entrance
Perth and Kinross		97.3	156.6	Kinfauns	Junction
Perth and Kinross	St Madoes; Glencarse	98.9– 99.6	159.2– 160.3	Glencarse, St Madoes, Errol, Inchyra	Junction; Errol signed eastbound only, Inchyra westbound only
Perth and Kinross		101.2	162.9	Glendoick	Junction
Perth and Kinross		103.2– 103.5	166.1– 166.6	Errol, Rait	Junction
Perth and Kinross	Inchture	105.7– 106.5	170.1– 171.4	B953 – Inchture, Abernyte, Kinnaird	Junction; Kinnaird signed westbound only
Perth and Kinross	Longforgan	108.0– 108.3	173.8– 174.3	Longforgan	Junction
Perth and Kinross	Longforgan	108.8	175.1	Longforgan	Junction; westbound exit only
Perth and Kinross– Dundee boundary	Dundee; Invergowrie boundary	110.4– 110.6	177.7– 178.0	Invergowrie	Junction; westbound exit and entrance
Perth and Kinross– Dundee boundary	Dundee; Invergowrie boundary	110.7	178.2	A90 north (Kingsway West) / Dykes of Gray Road – Aberdeen, Forfar, Denhead of Gray	Eastern terminus of A90 concurrency
Dundee	Dundee	114.8	184.8	A991 to A90 / A92 / A923 – Coupar Angus, Tay Bridge, Arbroath, Aberdeen, Perth	Eastern terminus
1.000 mi = 1.609 km; 1.000 km = 0.621 mi: Concurrency terminus; Incomplete access
