= Balmoor Bridge =

19th century bridge in Aberdeenshire, Scotland

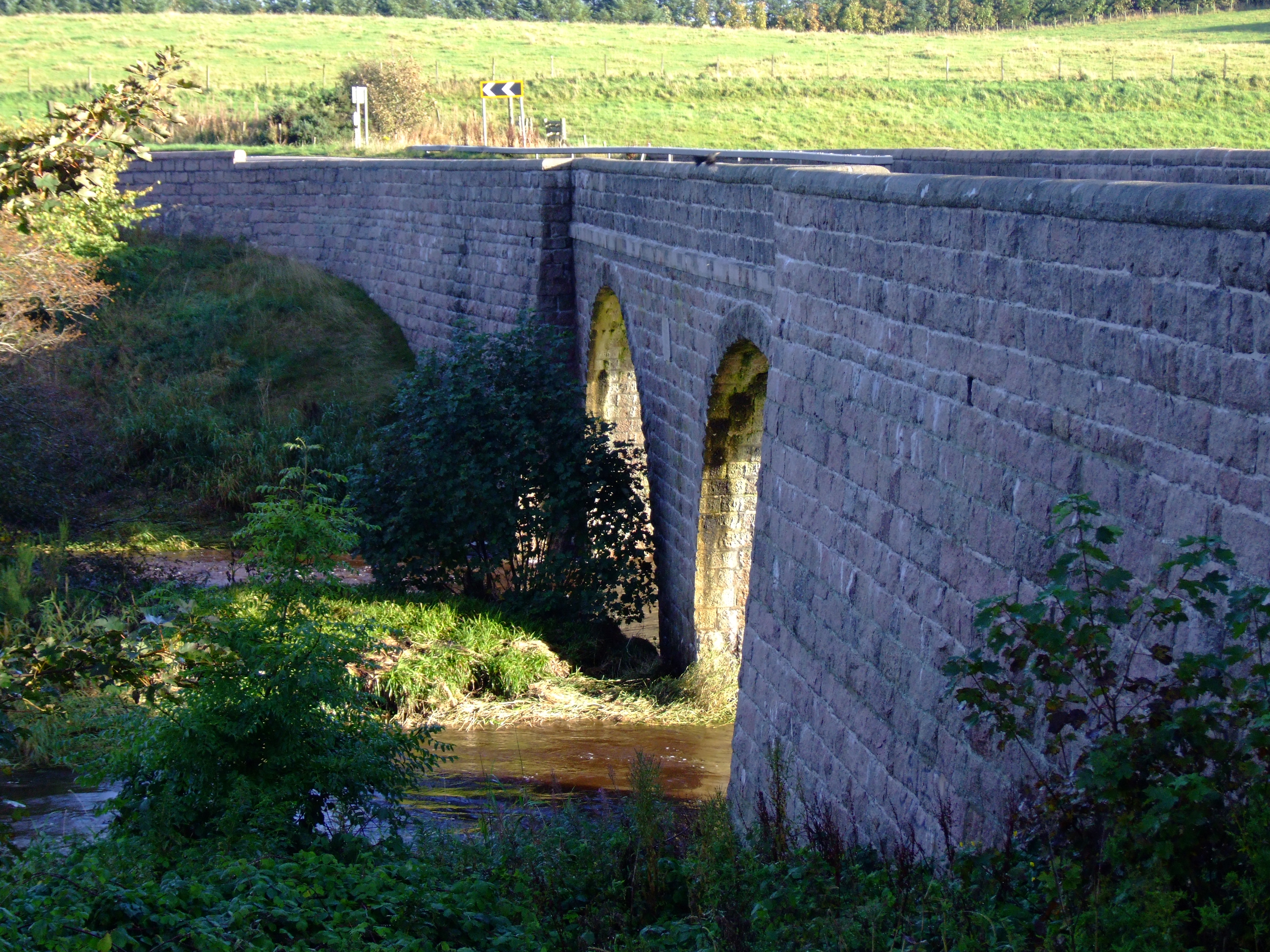
- A view from the bridge's southern side
- Coordinates: 57.524889°N 1.819352°W
- OS grid reference: NK 10916 48320
- Carries: A90
- Crosses: River Ugie
- Locale: Aberdeenshire
- Preceded by: Inverugie Bridge
- Followed by: Birnie Memorial Bridge

Characteristics
- Longest span: 180 feet (55 m)

History
- Designer: John Willet
- Opened: 1884

Listed Building – Category B
- Official name: Balmoor Bridge Over River Ugie
- Designated: 15 April 1971
- Reference no.: LB16388

Location
- Interactive map of Balmoor Bridge

Balmoor Bridge is a toll-free, three-span bridge in Aberdeenshire, Scotland. A Category B listed structure, it spans the River Ugie, carrying the two lanes of traffic of the A90 to or from Peterhead, to the south, or St Fergus, to the north. It was designed by John Willet, and features two semi-circular arches and voussoirs.

== See also ==
- List of bridges in Scotland
