= A93 road =

Road in Scotland

A93

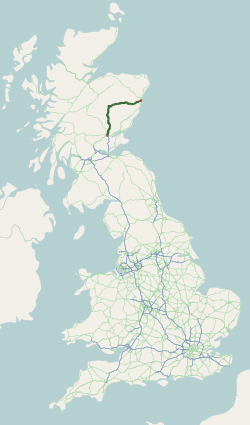

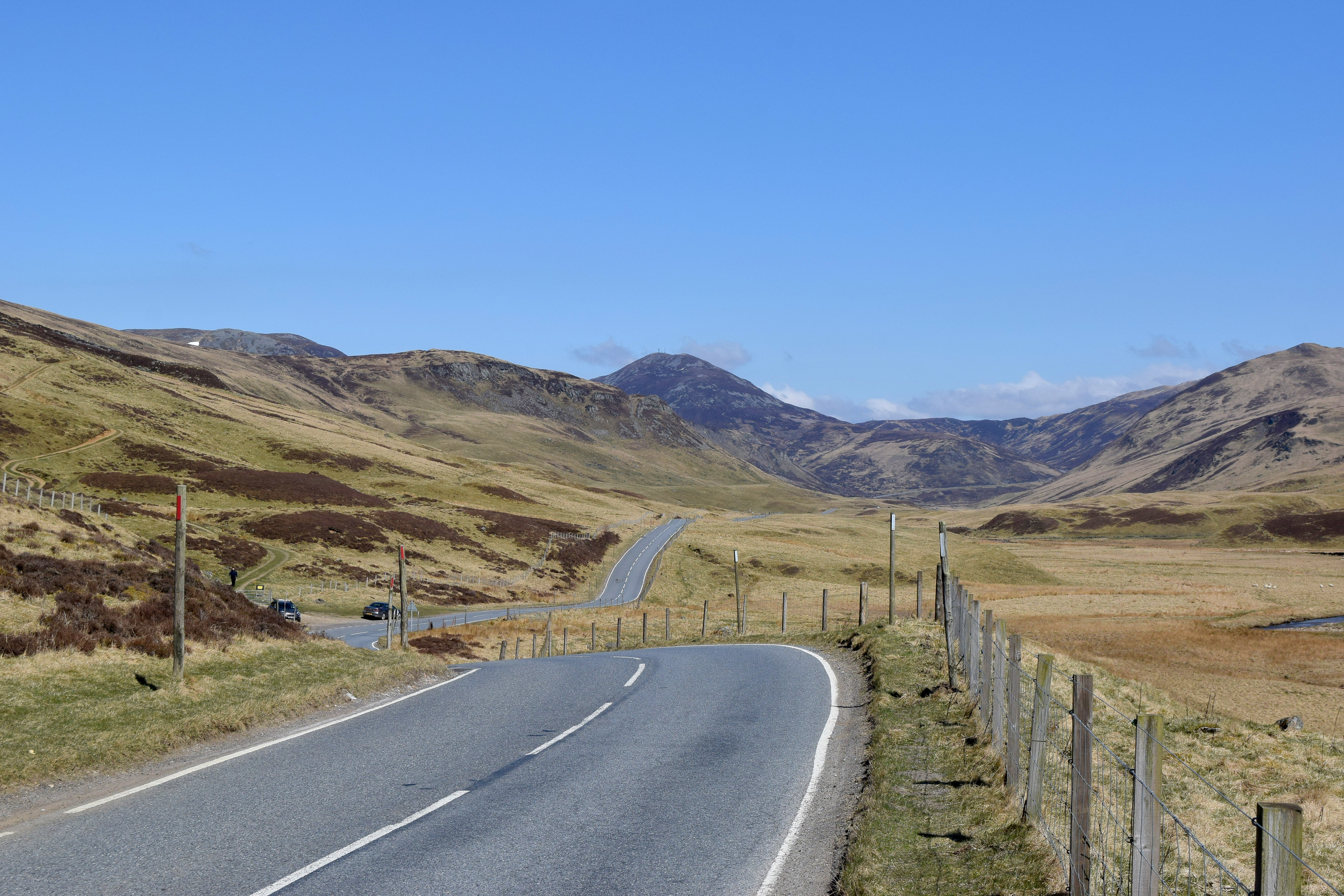
- The A93 in Gleann Beag

Route information
- Length: 109.6 mi (176.4 km)

Major junctions
- South end: M90 / A9 near Perth
- A85 in Perth; A97 at Dinnet; A92 in Aberdeen
- North end: Holburn Street / Willowbrook Road in Aberdeen

Location
- Country: United Kingdom
- Primary destinations: Perth, Blairgowrie, Braemar, Aberdeen

Road network
- Roads in the United Kingdom; Motorways; A and B road zones

The A93 is a major road in Scotland and the highest public road in the United Kingdom. It runs north from Perth through Blairgowrie and Rattray, then through the Grampian Mountains by way of Glenshee, the Cairnwell Pass and Glen Clunie to Braemar in Aberdeenshire. At Braemar, the road then switches east down the strath of the River Dee before crossing the A90 and terminating in Aberdeen.

== Route ==
Leaving Perth, the A93 continues through the planned 19th-century village of Guildtown before crossing the River Isla and passing the Meikleour Beech Hedges. 5 miles (8 km) north lies Blairgowrie and Rattray, the largest town in Perth and Kinross, where the road crosses the River Ericht. 6 miles (9.7 km) up Glenericht it reaches the little village of Bridge of Cally and begins the long climb up into Glenshee. At this point, it climbs from Glenshee onto the moors of Glenbeg and the snow gates at Spittal of Glenshee, which are regularly closed in winter (which here can be from October to April) to prevent motorists becoming stranded overnight. At the Cairnwell Pass, the road reaches its maximum elevation of 670 metres (2,199 ft) above sea level, which makes it, at this point, the highest public road in the United Kingdom. The southern approach to the Cairnwell Pass used to include a notorious double hairpin bend with steep gradients known as the Devil's Elbow. This was bypassed by a new stretch of road in the early 1970s but the old hairpin bends and World War II anti-tank traps can be accessed on foot from a lay-by part way up the hill.

Over the summit of the Cairnwell Pass, the road enters Aberdeenshire and the standard of the carriageway improves considerably, wider and better surfaced than the 42 miles (68 km) in Perth and Kinross. Descending now, it runs along deserted Glen Clunie alongside the Clunie Water for 8 miles (13 km) to Braemar. So far the road has been running roughly north, but here it turns east for the 60-mile (97 km) descent to the North Sea at Aberdeen. 10 miles (16 km) from Braemar, it passes Balmoral Castle, then continues through Ballater, Dinnet, Aboyne, Kincardine O'Neil, Banchory and Peterculter before entering Aberdeen.

== Storms of 2015 ==
A section of the A93 near Crathie collapsed on 29–30 December 2015 due to pressure from the overflowing River Dee. The Dee had burst its banks due to the effects of Storm Frank, which caused very severe flooding across Deeside.

== Junction list ==
Council area	Location	mi	km	Destinations	Notes
Perth and Kinross	Perth boundary	0.0	0.0	M90 south / A9 to A85 – Edinburgh, Dundee, Aberdeen, Glasgow, Stirling, Inverness, Crianlarich	Southern terminus; northern terminus of M90
Perth and Kinross	Perth	2.2	3.5	A989 north (A912 north) / York Place to M90 / A90 / A85 – City centre, Dundee	Routes and Dundee signed northbound only; southern terminus of A989 / A912 concurrency
Perth and Kinross	Perth	2.8	4.5	A912 south (Edinburgh Road) / Princes Street to M90 – Edinburgh, Forth Road Bridge	Eastern terminus of A912 concurrency
Perth and Kinross	Perth	3.1	5.0	Tay Street (A989 north)	No direct access from A93 south to A989 north; eastern terminus of A989 concurrency
Perth and Kinross	Perth	3.1– 3.3	5.0– 5.3	Queen's Bridge over River Tay	
Perth and Kinross	Perth	3.3	5.3	A85 east to M90 / A90 – Dundee, Edinburgh	To A90 and Edinburgh signed northbound only, A85 southbound only; western terminus of A85 concurrency
Perth and Kinross	Bridgend	3.6	5.8	A85 west (West Bridge Street) / Lochie Brae to A9 – City centre, Crieff, Inverness	City centre signed northbound only, A85, To A9, Crieff and Inverness southbound only; eastern terminus of A85 concurrency
Perth and Kinross	Bridgend	3.8	6.1	A94 east (Strathmore Street) – Scone, Perth Airport, Coupar Angus	Information signed northbound only; western terminus of A94
Perth and Kinross		6.4	10.3	A9294 (New Kingsway)	
Perth and Kinross		15.1	24.3	A984 (Old Military Road) – Meikleour, Spittalfield, Dunkeld, Coupar Angus, Caputh	
Perth and Kinross	Blairgowrie and Rattray	18.5	29.8	A923 west (Dunkeld Road) – Dunkeld	Southern terminus of A923 concurrency
Perth and Kinross	Blairgowrie and Rattray	19.0	30.6	A923 east (Gas Brae) – Coupar Angus, Dundee	Northern terminus of A923 concurrency
Perth and Kinross	Blairgowrie and Rattray	19.2	30.9	A926 east (High Street) / Ericht Lane – Alyth, Kirriemuir	Western terminus of A926
Perth and Kinross	Bridge of Cally	24.6	39.6	A924 west – Ballintuim, Kirkmichael, Pitlochry	Eastern terminus of A924
Aberdeenshire		67.2	108.1	A939 north – Tomintoul	Southern terminus of A939
Aberdeenshire	Dinnet	75.7	121.8	A97 north / Firmounth Road (B9158) to A944 / B976 – Huntly, South Deeside, Logie Coldstone, Strathdon	Southern terminsu of A97
Aberdeenshire	Banchory	93.2	150.0	A980 north (Raemoir Road) to B977 – Torphins, Echt	Southern terminus of A980
Aberdeenshire		96.1	154.7	A957 south – Stonehaven	Northern terminus of A957
Aberdeen City	Aberdeen	108.7	174.9	A92 (Anderson Drive) to A90 / A96 – City centre (N)	
Aberdeen City	Aberdeen	109.6	176.4	Holburn Street / Willowbank Road	Northern terminus
1.000 mi = 1.609 km; 1.000 km = 0.621 mi: Concurrency terminus; Incomplete access
