= Collie Burn =

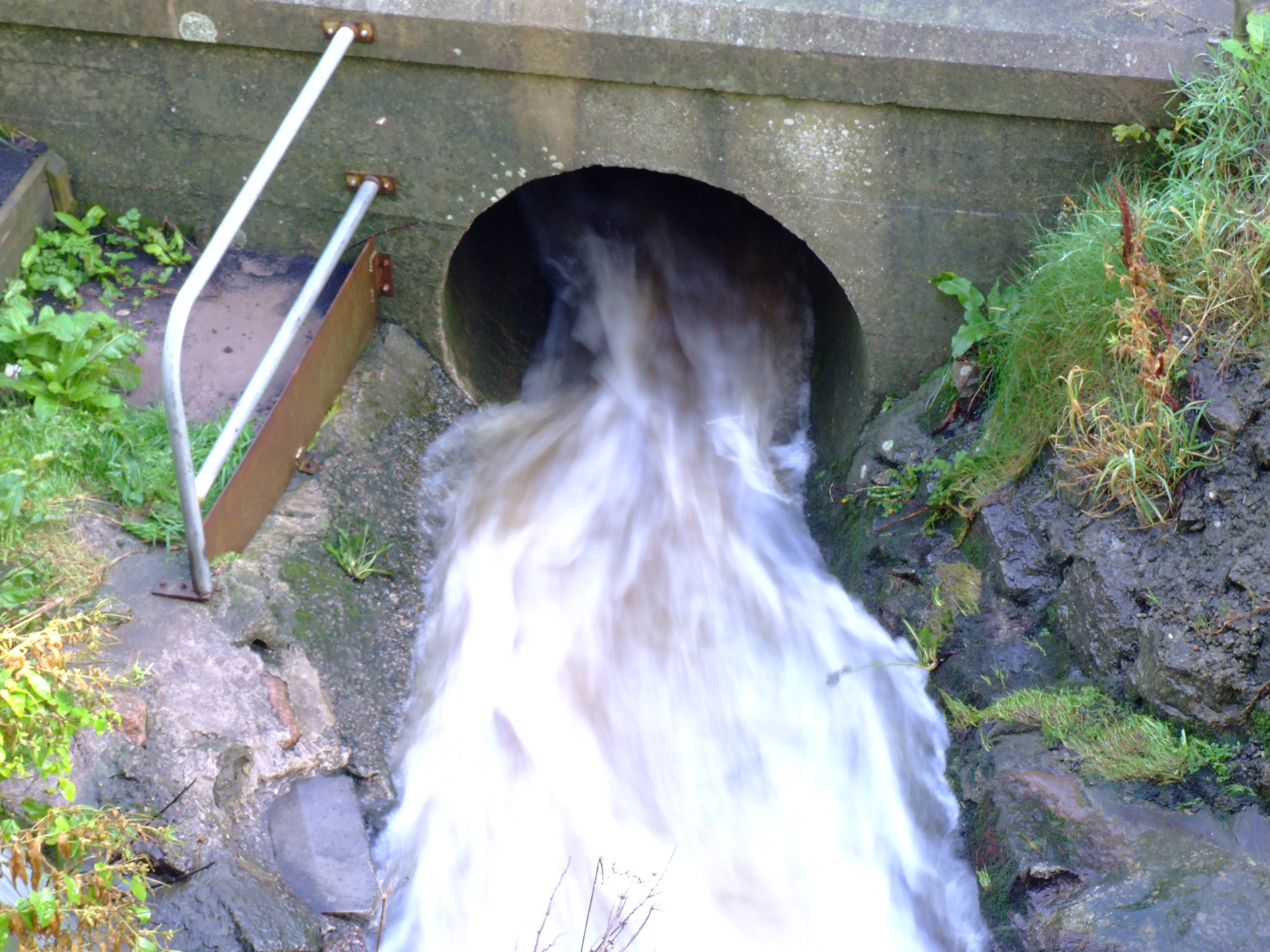
- Passing through a culvert beneath the A982

Physical characteristics
- Source
  - location: Peterhead, Aberdeenshire
  - coordinates: 57.495747°N 1.847092°W
- Mouth: River Ugie
  - location: Peterhead, Aberdeenshire
  - coordinates: 57.516856°N 1.809919°W
  - elevation: Sea level
- Length: ~2.3 mi

Collie Burn is a watercourse in Peterhead, Aberdeenshire, Scotland.

A Collieburn Crescent exists in Peterhead, but it is located around 0.4 miles (0.64 km) east of the burn's mouth, in the vicinity of the Fish-House.

In 2014, work was undertaken to repair the crumbling banks of the burn.

The burn's name is derived from the Gaelic Coille, meaning hill or wood.

== Course ==
The burn runs for around 2.3 miles (3.7 km) from a spring to the northeast of Hillhead of Cocklaw and flows in that direction initially, passing beneath several farm access roads. It turns north as it flows towards Longside Road, before turning east to pass beneath the roundabout at Longside Road and the A90. It continues, just south of Howe o'Buchan House, along the northern side of Longside Road for a couple of hundred yards, then turns north at the edge of Peterhead's downtown. Continuing north, through Collieburn Park, the burn passes beneath Inverugie Road and then runs parallel to Maggie Black's Trail. Shortly before emptying into the River Ugie, the burn passes beneath North Road, the A982, just east of its junction with Waterside Road. It was in this section that 32 feet (9.8 m) of the burn's banks washed away in 2014.
