= Salmond's Muir =

Coordinates: 56.530335°N 2.684395°W

- Location within Angus
- OS grid reference: NO580378
- Council area: Angus
- Lieutenancy area: Angus
- Country: Scotland
- Sovereign state: United Kingdom
- Post town: CARNOUSTIE
- Postcode district: DD7
- Dialling code: 01241
- Police: Scotland
- Fire: Scottish
- Ambulance: Scottish
- UK Parliament: Dundee East
- Scottish Parliament: Angus; North East Scotland

Salmond's Muir is a hamlet in the council area of Angus, Scotland. It is situated 2 miles (3 km) north-east of Carnoustie and 4 miles (6 km) west of Arbroath on the A92 road. The junction of the A92 at Salmond's Muir forms the main route to the villages of Panbride, East Haven, Balmirmer and Scryne.

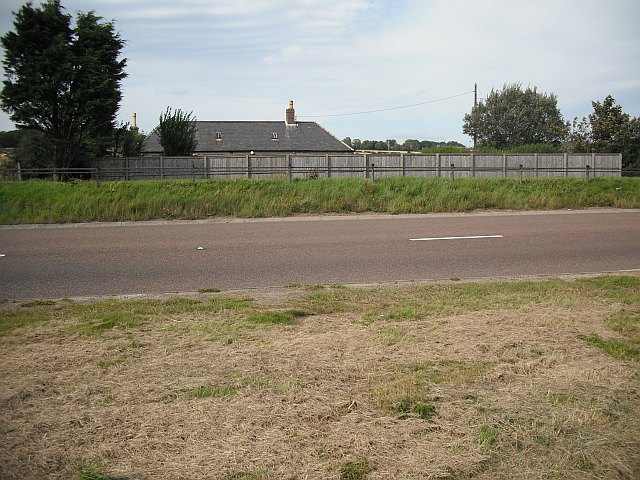
Salmond's Muir

Salmond's Muir is recorded in documents of the Commissioners of the Guardians of Scotland from 1286, in which a dispute over ownership of the land was settled with the land being determined as property of Christiana of Maule.

== See also ==
Carnoustie
