= Lecht Ski Centre =

Ski resort in the Cairngorms, Scotland

Coordinates: 57.1681°N 3.2315°W

Lecht 2090
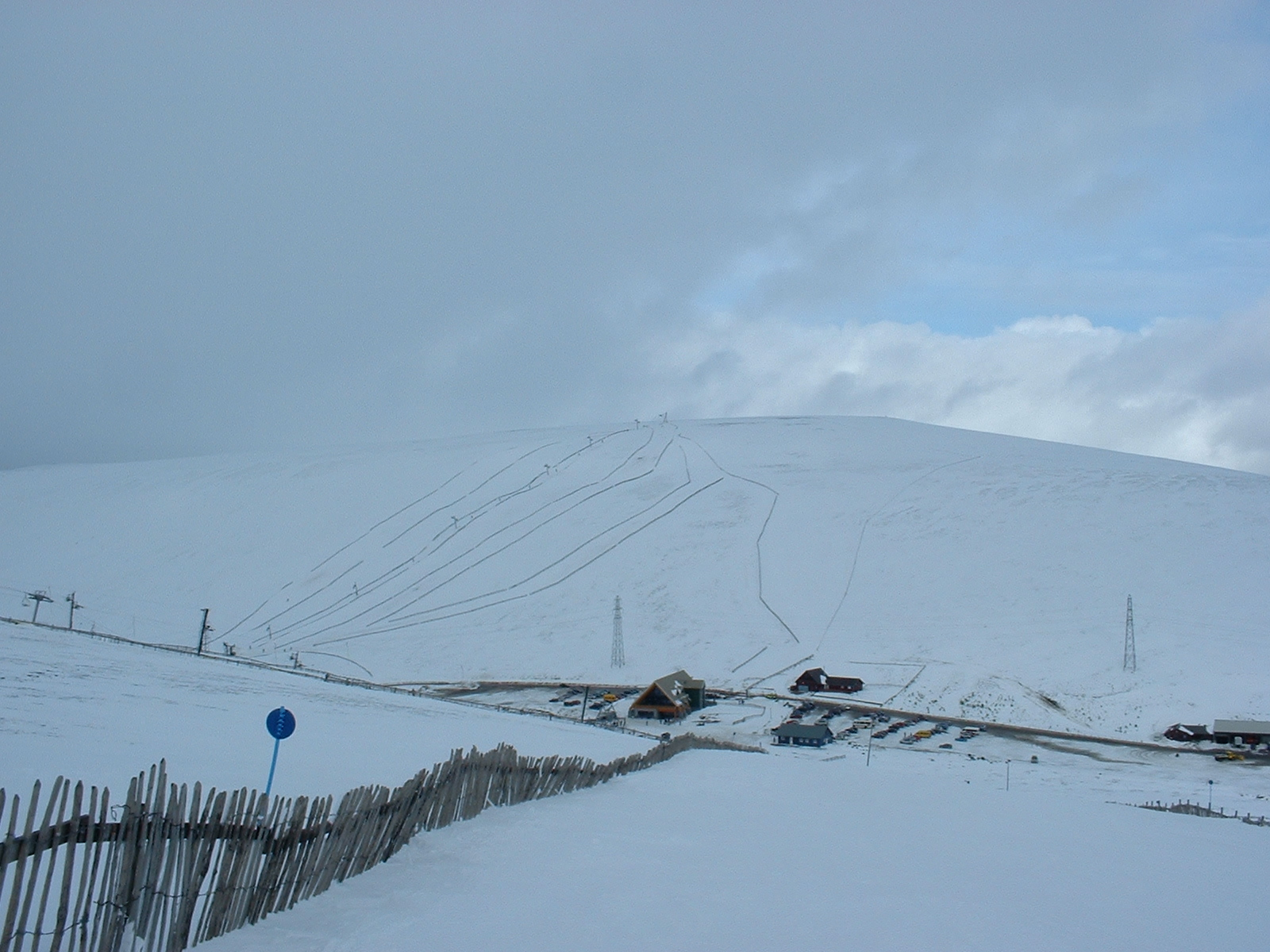
- The Lecht Ski centre base lodge, viewed from the Eagle ski runs. The Buzzard poma can be seen in the background.
- Interactive map of Lecht 2090
- Location: Cairngorms National Park
- Nearest city: Inverness
- Vertical: 462 ft (141 m)
- Top elevation: 2,552 ft (778 m)
- Base elevation: 2,090 ft (640 m)
- Skiable area: 16 miles (26 km)
- Trails: 23 total; 22% easy; 52% intermediate; 22% difficult; 4% advanced
- Longest run: 0.6 miles (1 km)
- Lift system: 14 total: 1 high-speed triple; 13 surface drag lifts
- Terrain parks: yes
- Snowfall: 126 in (320 cm)
- Snowmaking: yes
- Night skiing: yes
- Website: Lecht 2090

The Lecht Ski Centre is an alpine ski area in the Cairngorms in the Scottish Highlands. The ski slopes are set around the mountains Beinn a' Chruinnich, 2,552 ft (778 m) and Meikle Corr Riabhach, 2556 ft (779 m), on the borders of the Aberdeenshire and Moray council areas.

The Lecht is the smallest ski area in Scotland in terms of area, number of runs and vertical drop and as such is the most suitable for beginners. 15 lifts provide access to 23 groomed pistes. The smooth, grassy terrain of Beinn a' Chruinnich and Meikle Corr Riabhach often allows the Lecht, despite the modest summit elevation, to provide snow sports with marginal snow cover when other ski areas in Scotland, with more mountainous terrain, may be closed.

The ski centre has been operating since the 1977. Prior to the acquisition of snow blowers in the late 1970s a small portable ski tow, giving approximately 200 feet (60 metres) of ski run, was often set up in the fields across from the Allargue Arms Hotel near Corgarff just below the snow gates. The Lecht Ski Centre has since grown into a year-round mountain activity centre. A new purpose built ski in-ski out day lodge at the bottom of the ski slopes offers a ski equipment rental department, a ski shop selling equipment and clothes, a ski school, cafe, bar and restaurant. The lodge is available for business meetings, private functions and weddings.

The ski centre is situated on the slopes above the A939 road between Cock Bridge and Tomintoul. This road is one of the highest main roads in the United Kingdom, navigating several mountain passes and rising to an elevation of 2090 ft (637m) at the Lecht. Local folklore has it that the road is blocked by snow between October and June. Whilst this is obviously exaggerated, the traditional heralding of the Scottish winter occurs when the road is first blocked and this is usually reported in the national news.
