= A972 road =

Road in Scotland

Coordinates: 56°28′39″N 2°56′7″W

A972

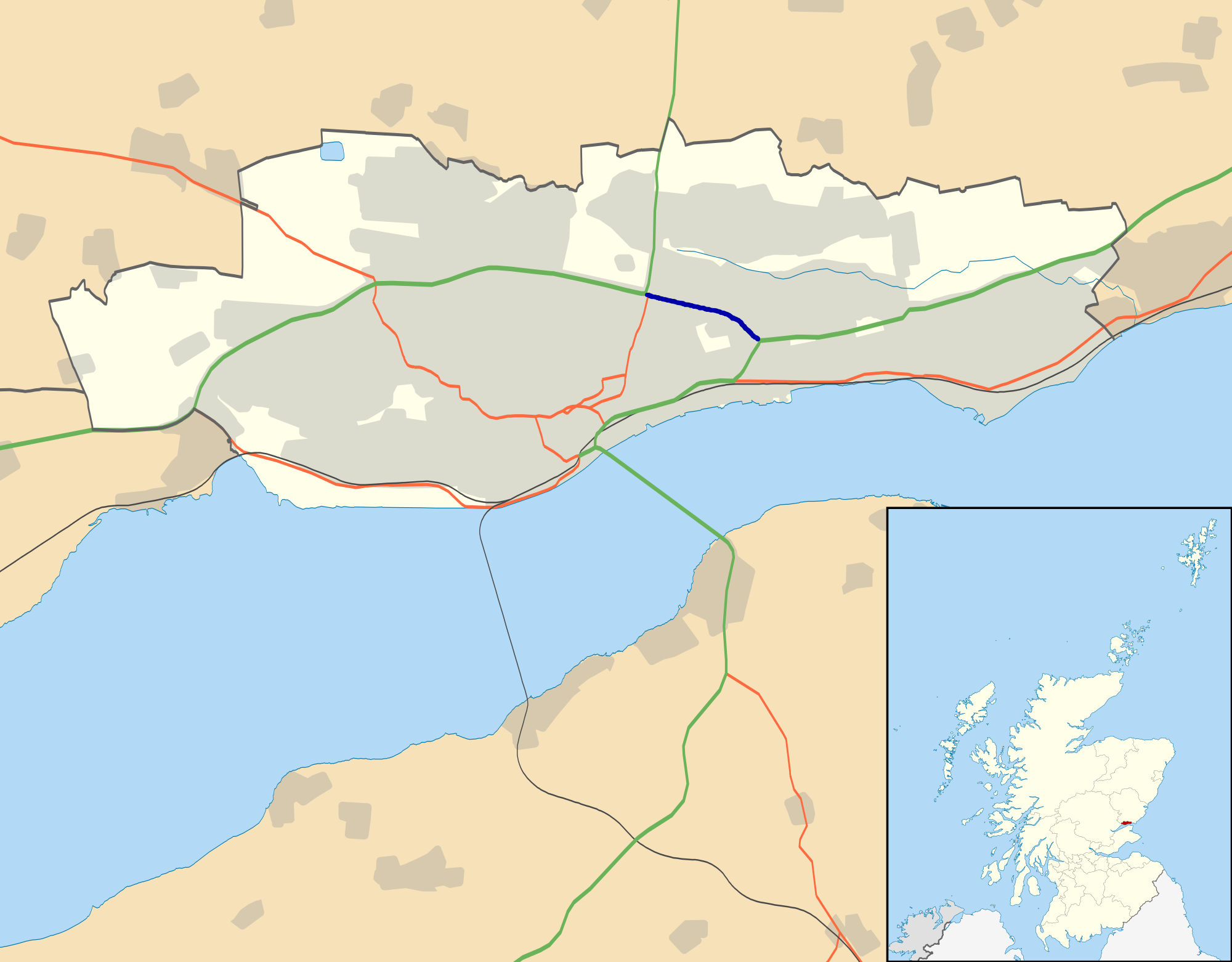

Major junctions
- West end: A90 Dundee
- East end: A92 Dundee

Location
- Country: United Kingdom
- Primary destinations: Dundee

Road network
- Roads in the United Kingdom; Motorways; A and B road zones

The A972 is a major road in Dundee, Scotland. It forms part of the dual carriageway known as the 'Kingsway', that runs through the northern part of Dundee. Its main function is to link the A90 road with the A92.

At its western end, the A972 joins with the A90 at its Forfar Road junction, and with the A929 which heads into Dundee city centre. Running eastward 1/3 mile (0.5 km), the road meets with Pitkerro Road, then after a further 1/2 mile (0.8 km), with the Mid Craigie Road roundabout. After a further 1/4 mile (0.4 km), the road ends at the Scott Fyffe Circle (roundabout), where it meets the A92.

== History ==
The A972 number used to include a longer stretch of road bypassing Dundee. In 1994 as part of a wider re-numbering, this section became part of the A90.
