= Upper Victoria =

Coordinates: 56.513751°N 2.755596°W

- Location within Angus
- OS grid reference: NO536360
- Council area: Angus
- Lieutenancy area: Angus
- Country: Scotland
- Sovereign state: United Kingdom
- Post town: CARNOUSTIE
- Postcode district: DD7
- Dialling code: 01382
- Police: Scotland
- Fire: Scottish
- Ambulance: Scottish
- UK Parliament: Dundee East
- Scottish Parliament: Angus North East Scotland

Upper Victoria is a hamlet in Angus, Scotland. It lies on the A92 road between Arbroath and Dundee and is the location of the junction of the A92 and the Marches, the Craigton to Carnoustie road, forming the main route into Carnoustie.

Upper Victoria was the site of Pitskelly quarry and, in the early 19th century, David Hunter of Blackness constructed a railway line between the quarry and Carnoustie to transport stone railway sleepers to the main line. The stone ultimately proved to be of inferior quality and the venture was abandoned.
