= Margaret Fairlie =

British gynaecologist

Margaret Fairlie FRCOG FRCSE
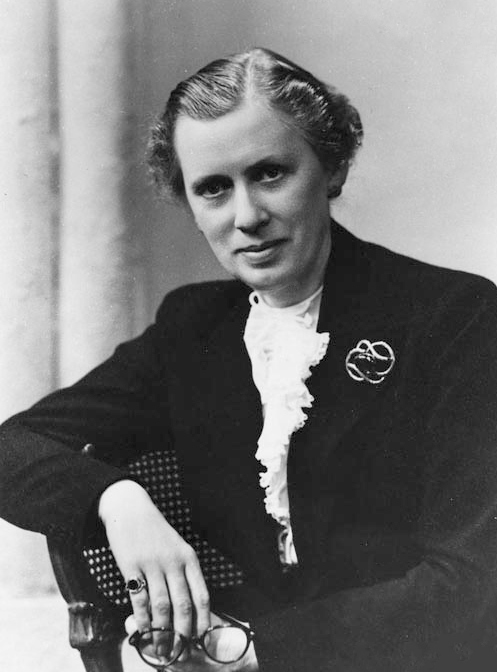
- Born: 1891; Angus, Scotland
- Died: 1963 (aged 71–72); Dundee, Scotland
- Education: University of St Andrews School of Medicine; University College, Dundee
- Occupations: gynaecologist, professor
- Known for: first female University professor in Scotland
- Medical career
- Institutions: Dundee Royal Infirmary

Margaret Fairlie FRCOG FRCSE (1891–1963) was a Scottish academic and gynaecologist. Fairlie spent most of her career working at Dundee Royal Infirmary and teaching at the medical school at University College, Dundee (later Queen's College, Dundee). In 1940 she became the first woman to hold a professorial chair in Scotland.

== Early life and education ==
Margaret Fairlie was born in 1891. Her parents were James Fairlie and his wife Marjory Mill Moug. She grew up at West Balmirmer Farm, Angus. She was educated at Arbirlot Public School, the Harris Academy in Dundee, and Skerry's College. From 1910 to 1915 she studied at the University of St Andrews School of Medicine and the University College, Dundee. After graduating with her MBChB from the University of St Andrews, she held various medical posts in Dundee, Perth, and Edinburgh, and at Saint Mary's Hospital, Manchester, where she trained in her specialism.

== Career ==
She returned to Dundee in 1919 where she ran a consultant practice for gynaecology.

=== Dundee Royal Infirmary and Dundee Medical School ===
In 1920, she began a teaching career at Dundee's Medical School, a role that lasted for almost four decades. In the mid-1920s, she joined the staff of Dundee Royal Infirmary, where she worked for the rest of her career. In 1926 she visited the Marie Curie Foundation in Paris and this caused her to develop a keen interest in the clinical applications of radium. As a result of this began employing it in the treatment of malignant gynaecological diseases, and thus pioneered its clinical use in Scotland. She also organised follow up clinics at Dundee Royal Infirmary for patients she had treated with radium. During the 1930s, she purchased radium for the Infirmary using her own savings. Away from the Infirmary, she acted as honorary gynaecologist to the Arbroath Infirmary, the Brechin Infirmary and the Montrose Royal Infirmary as well as the Forfar Infirmary and was involved with cases throughout Angus and Perthshire.

Her students at Dundee included Agnes Herring, known as Jean, who in 1949 became consultant in charge of the Gynaecology Department at Maryfield Hospital.

=== Scotland's first female professor ===
In 1936, Fairlie became head of Dundee Royal Infirmary's Obstetrics and Gynaecology Department. Normally such an appointment would have led to her becoming Professor of Obstetrics and Gynaecology at the University of St Andrews, but attempts to grant her this position were initially blocked, partly due to ongoing difficulties between University College, Dundee and the university authorities in St Andrews. However, it also seems that Sir James Irvine, the principal of the University of St Andrews, and then acting principal of University College, Dundee, was reluctant to appoint a woman to a chair.

After four years of impasse, Fairlie, backed by the directors of Dundee Royal Infirmary, was finally appointed as Professor of Obstetrics and Gynaecology at the University of St Andrews, based in Dundee in 1940. She held this post until her retirement from both the university and the infirmary in 1956. At the time of her retirement she was still the only female professor in Scotland.

As well as her academic responsibilities she served as warden of the West Park Hall of residence for women students.

Whilst Fairlie was the first female professor in Scotland, she was not the first Scottish female professor, for example being preceded by Doris Mackinnon and Agnes Marshall Cowan.

== Personal life ==
Fairlie never married, although she was engaged to her colleague, the surgeon Professor Lloyd Turton Price at the time of his unexpected death in 1933. She was a popular figure with the students and staff she worked with and was noted for her warm hospitality. Professor Fairlie was a keen traveller visiting several countries including South Africa, Greece, Italy, Canada and the United States. In her spare time, she cultivated her garden and enjoyed painting. She also kept a parrot.

== Death and legacy ==
In July 1963 Fairlie was visiting Florence when she took ill. On her return to Scotland she was admitted to Dundee Royal Infirmary, and died shortly afterwards.

In recognition of her achievements, Fairlie was awarded an honorary degree by the University of St Andrews in 1957. She retained a keen interest in both the University and the Infirmary until her death in 1963.

A range of archive material relating to Fairlie is held by Archive Services, University of Dundee. The professorial board with Fairlie's name engraved on it (which would have once stood in the Medical School) is now on permanent display in the University in a corridor beside the Archives.

A plaque celebrating Fairlie has been placed opposite the gates of the old Dundee Royal Infirmary as part of the Dundee Women's Trail. In 2015 it was announced Fairlie would be one of ten people associated with Dundee to be given a plaque in the city's new Discovery Walk in Slessor Gardens.

In 2015, the University of Dundee held its first Margaret Fairlie Lecture in her honour. The inaugural lecture was delivered by Professor Dame Sally Davies and was attended by members of Fairlie's family.
