= Snow gates =

Gates used to stop traffic in snowfall

Snow gates (in an open position) on the A889

Snow gates are movable barriers that can be placed across a road during periods of snowfall that may render the road impassable and strand motorists. In Great Britain, most snow gates are in Scotland or Northern England and are typically painted bright colours, most commonly orange. Snow gates allow roads to be closed to prevent traffic from entering areas prone to heavy snowfall. Such closures are intended to reduce the risk of vehicles becoming stranded and to facilitate snow-clearance operations. The gates are provided by local authorities, which determine their operation in consultation with the police.

In Scotland, snow gates are found on the A9, A68, A82, A93, A96, A832, A835, A889, A899, A939 and B974. The gates on the A96 at the Glens of Foudland are "virtual gates", which enable the road to be closed quickly in the event of sudden snowfall. Snow gates may also be used to close roads because of other hazards, such as landslides. Similar to snow gates, a road near Gourock in Inverclyde has storm gates because of its proximity to the sea and may be closed during severe weather conditions. Gates may be permanently installed at the roadside or may be temporary installations deployed when road closures are required.

In England, there are snow gates on the A66 at Bowes in County Durham, and on the eastbound carriageway approximately 2–3 kilometres (1.2–1.9 mi) east of the A685 slip roads. The areas around the snow gates on both sides of the A66 include turning areas to allow vehicles whose drivers are unaware of a road closure to reverse direction more easily. Gates have also been installed on roads crossing the Long Mynd in Shropshire, owing to icy conditions and the absence of crash barriers along sections of road with steep drops.

In North America, snow gates are attachments fitted to snow-clearing equipment that prevent snow from being deposited across residential driveways during road-clearing operations.
