= Kirkmichael, South Ayrshire =

Coordinates: 55.346°N 4.615°W

Kirkmichael: Scottish Gaelic: Cille Mhìcheil
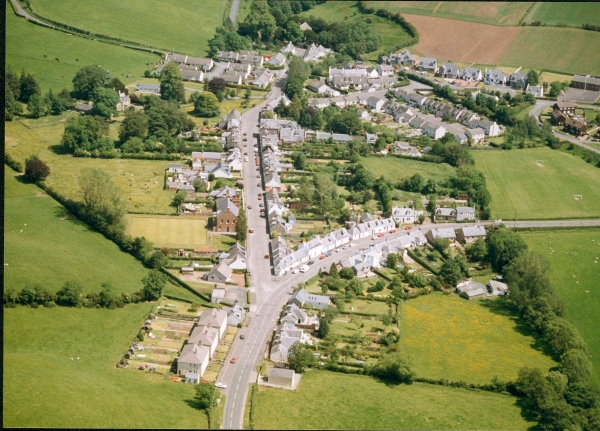

- Location within South Ayrshire
- OS grid reference: NS343089
- Council area: South Ayrshire
- Lieutenancy area: Ayrshire and Arran
- Country: Scotland
- Sovereign state: United Kingdom
- Post town: MAYBOLE
- Postcode district: KA19
- Police: Scotland
- Fire: Scottish
- Ambulance: Scottish
- UK Parliament: Ayr, Carrick and Cumnock
- Scottish Parliament: Carrick, Cumnock and Doon Valley

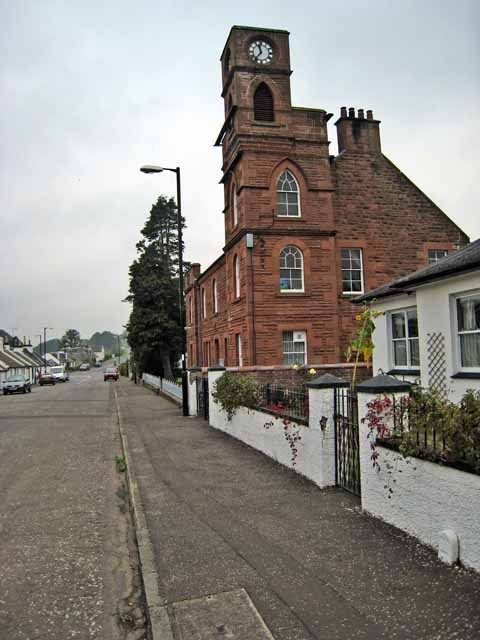
Kirkmichael Community Hall, South Ayrshire

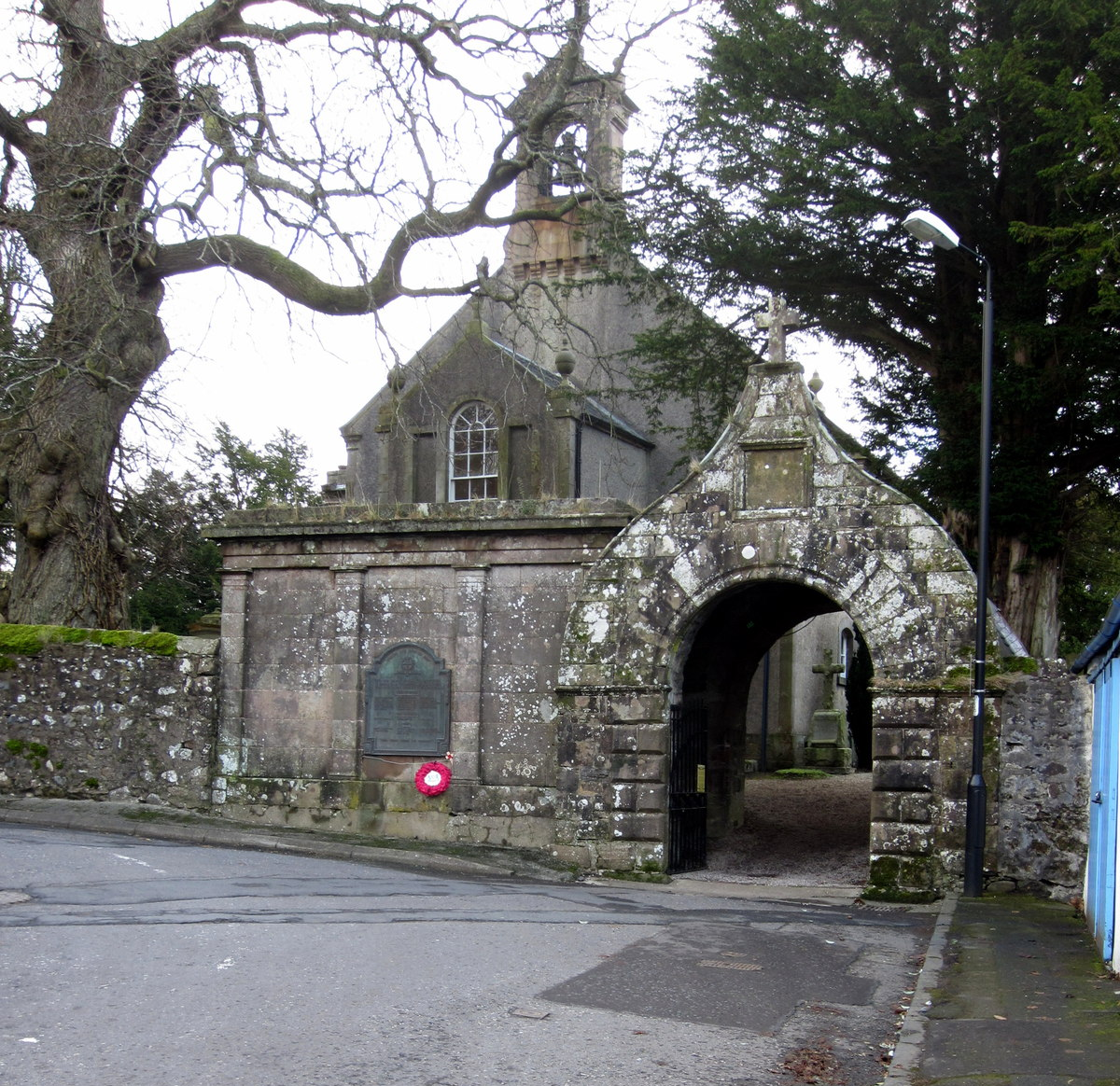
Kirkmichael Parish Church, South Ayrshire

Kirkmichael (Gaelic: Cille Mhìcheil, "the church of St Michael") is a village in South Ayrshire, Scotland, located between Patna, Maybole and Straiton. It was also a civil parish. In 1991 it had a population of 647.

== The village ==
Kirkmichael lies 3 miles (5 km) east of Maybole and started life as the focus of a well populated rural parish served by its church. Today it is a largely white harled small village set amid the rolling hills of South Ayrshire, a 10-mile (16 km) drive south of central Ayr.

Its origins date back to the 13th century when John de Gemmelstoun founded a church beside the Dyrock Burn here, which he dedicated to St. Michael. For much of its early life the village was called Kirkmichael of Gemilston, after its founder, but the name was eventually simplified.

The village church dates back to 1787 and is a fairly typical T-plan design intended to provide a large number of seats within a fairly small space, all exposed to the full force of the preacher's oratory.

The surrounding churchyard reflects its much greater age, though the attractive lich gate leading to it only dates back to 1702, according to the inscription on its bell. The lich gate was intended to accommodate mourners at funerals.

Kirkmichael focuses on two intersecting streets, largely occupied by white cottages built for hand-weavers in the 1790s. The most unusual building is the red stone McCosh Hall in Patna Road. This serves as the village hall and in 1898 was gifted to the village by James McCosh, President of Princeton University, whose family came from this part of Ayrshire. At the junction of Patna Road and Straiton Road lies the white-painted Kirkmichael Arms, a long one-storey village inn.

It has a pub, a restaurant and one post office.

Kirkmichael House on the south west side of the village is a Scottish baronial mansion dating from the 17th century. It was originally the home of the noble Kennedy family, before becoming a miners' welfare home and a boarding school.

=== Notable people ===
- John McCosh, army surgeon and photographer, the earliest war photographer whose name is known.
- Samuel McGaw, recipient of the Victoria Cross.
- John Willet, engineer. Attended the village primary school.

== Guitar festival ==
Kirkmichael was the venue for the Kirkmichael International Guitar Festival. From 1999 until 2005 (except 2004, when the event was not held) for three days in May, Kirkmichael became Scotland's guitar village and played host to thousands of music lovers from around the world. They came together for a weekend catering to all musical tastes from folk to flamenco and jazz to rock and roll.

== Industry ==
The mining industry that dominated much of South Ayrshire left Kirkmichael unscathed. The same cannot be said for many of those employed in the industry, and it is a mark of the village's attractive location and environment that in the early 20th century the large Kirkmichael House, to the south of the village, was converted into a miners' welfare home, while another was opened near Cloncaird Castle to the south east. Both closed in the 1950s.
