= Willie Logan (Loganair) =

William Logan (1913–1966) was a Scottish construction engineer who founded Loganair. He contributed to many important infrastructure projects in Scotland during the 1950s and 1960s, primarily road networks bridges and hydroelectric schemes. He was managing director of Duncan Logan Ltd, an engineering company started by his father, Duncan Logan, and based in Muir of Ord.

== Early life ==
Logan was educated at Dingwall Academy, and lived in Dingwall in a house built to his own designs called Parklea, which was also the name of his wife Helen Dunbar's previous family home in Dingwall town centre.

== Selected construction projects ==
- Orrin Reservoir
- Tay Road Bridge

== Parklea House ==
A highly advanced house for its time, especially for the North of Scotland, Parklea was built during the early 1950s and was full of luxurious touches, including an automatic garage door opening system—Willie's chauffeur would drop off the Logans at the north-facing front door, then swing down the steep curved driveway, rolling over a thick rubber actuating strip that would then send an electrical signal to open the double garage doors. The house interior has a partition system so that the day room and the dining room could become one room, for entertaining large parties. The bathroom was the piece de resistance with terrazzo flooring, an Art Deco style suite, beautiful mirrors, and a bidet, something of a novelty in those days. Photographs of the interior were taken in 1990 by Historic Scotland before the house was sold.

== Loganair ==
Logan bought an air taxi firm with one aircraft in 1962, which he renamed Loganair. Scheduled flights began in 1963. By 1966 Loganair was a public Transport Operator with five aircraft based at Glasgow Airport and continued to provide transportation around numerous work sites for the Logan Group on a pre-booked basis.

== Death ==
Fodderty memorial

On the evening of Friday 22 January 1966, Logan telephoned Loganair Operations requesting an aircraft to fly him from Edinburgh to Inverness Airport but, when told no suitable aircraft was available, said he would return home by the evening train. He then apparently changed his mind and called an unapproved air taxi company, Strathallan Air Services Ltd. to fly him to Inverness in their Piper Aztec, registration G-ARYG. The pilot was Peter Tunstall. Towards the end of the flight, the pilot commenced an unapproved spiral descent through cloud, at night overhead the Inverness Non-directional Beacon that was sited on Craig Dunain, a hill of 922 feet, some five miles west of the airport. Without local knowledge and carrying no suitable charts, the pilot thought the beacon was sited on the airport. Still flying in cloud he crashed on the hillside. On impact, the cabin door burst open and Mr. Logan, still strapped to his seat and probably asleep as was his practice during evening flights, was ejected from the cabin and killed. The pilot sustained a broken arm and minor injuries and eventually walked down the hillside to Inverness to report his accident. Until then no-one, other than the pilot was aware of anything amiss. Without a flight plan being filed, the aircraft had not been reported overdue by Inverness Airport. The wreckage and Mr. Logan's body were discovered by the Emergency Services soon after daybreak.

At the subsequent inquiry, the pilot claimed no memory of his previous evening's activity and for reasons not made public, no charges were brought against him. Because Mr. Logan had chosen to ignore his own Company's insurance policy that his flying should be limited to scheduled airlines, Loganair or a public transport company approved by Loganair, Logan's insurers refused to make any compensation payments. Strathallan's insurance cover was a derisory £3,500 in accordance with the Warsaw Convention and paid to the Logan Company. The death of Mr. Logan went on to affect the lives of hundreds of people and culminated in the liquidation of the Logan Group in 1970. The share capital of Loganair had been transferred to the National Commercial Bank in 1968. Mrs. Logan remained at Parklea until her death in 1990 although she could not afford to maintain the showpiece garden which her husband had established. He is buried in Fodderty Cemetery, near Strathpeffer where his grave is marked with a stone in the shape of a section of the Tay Road Bridge.
