= Cock Bridge, Aberdeenshire =

Coordinates: 57°09′57″N 3°13′48″W

Cock Bridge
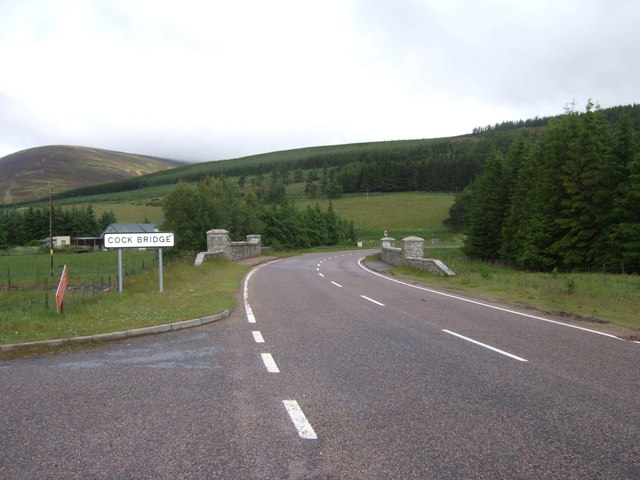
- Cock Bridge

- Location within Aberdeenshire
- OS grid reference: NJ257092
- Council area: Aberdeenshire
- Lieutenancy area: Aberdeenshire
- Country: Scotland
- Sovereign state: United Kingdom
- Post town: STRATHDON
- Postcode district: AB36
- Police: Scotland
- Fire: Scottish
- Ambulance: Scottish
- UK Parliament: West Aberdeenshire and Kincardine
- Scottish Parliament: Aberdeenshire West

Cock Bridge is a settlement in Aberdeenshire, Scotland, located in the Cairngorms National Park, on the A939 road near Corgarff and Corgarff Castle, between Bellabeg at Strathdon in Aberdeenshire, on the road to the Lecht Ski Centre, and towards Tomintoul in Moray.

The road signs of the village are regularly stolen.
