= John Willet =

Scottish engineer

- Born: 6 February 1815; Kirkmichael, South Ayrshire, Scotland
- Died: 15 August 1891 (aged 76); Aberdeen, Scotland
- Known for: Bridge design

John Willet, M.Inst.C.E. (6 February 1815 – 15 August 1891) was a Scottish engineer who was mainly involved in bridge design. His office was in Union Terrace, Aberdeen, as of 1882.

At the age of 22, he became an apprentice to James Thomson.

== Personal life ==
Willet married Mary Ann Rennie (1832–1915) in 1854. They had at least two children: Archibald William Willet (1858–1942) and Mary Annabelle Willet (1859–1928).

He died in 1891, aged 76. He was interred in Allenvale Cemetery, Aberdeen. His wife and daughter are also buried there.
