= River Ugie =

River in Aberdeenshire, Scotland

Coordinates: 57°30′N 1°47′W

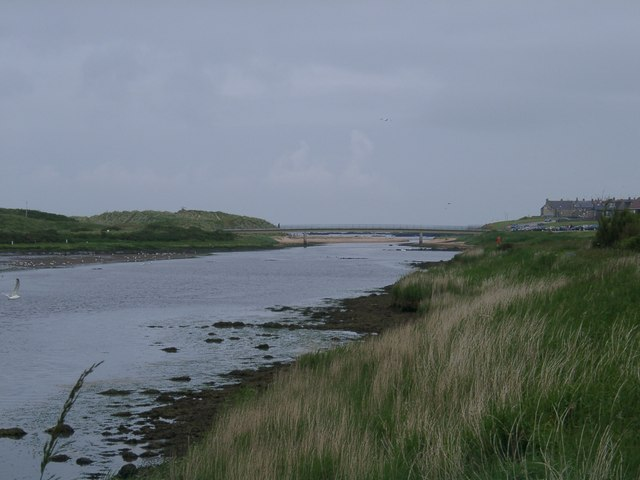
The River Ugie near Peterhead

The River Ugie or Ugie Water is a river in Buchan, Aberdeenshire, Scotland.

It is formed by the junction of two streams, the North Ugie and the South Ugie, which meet near Longside. From here, the river flows eastwards to fall into the North Sea near Buchanhaven, north of Peterhead.

== Settlements ==
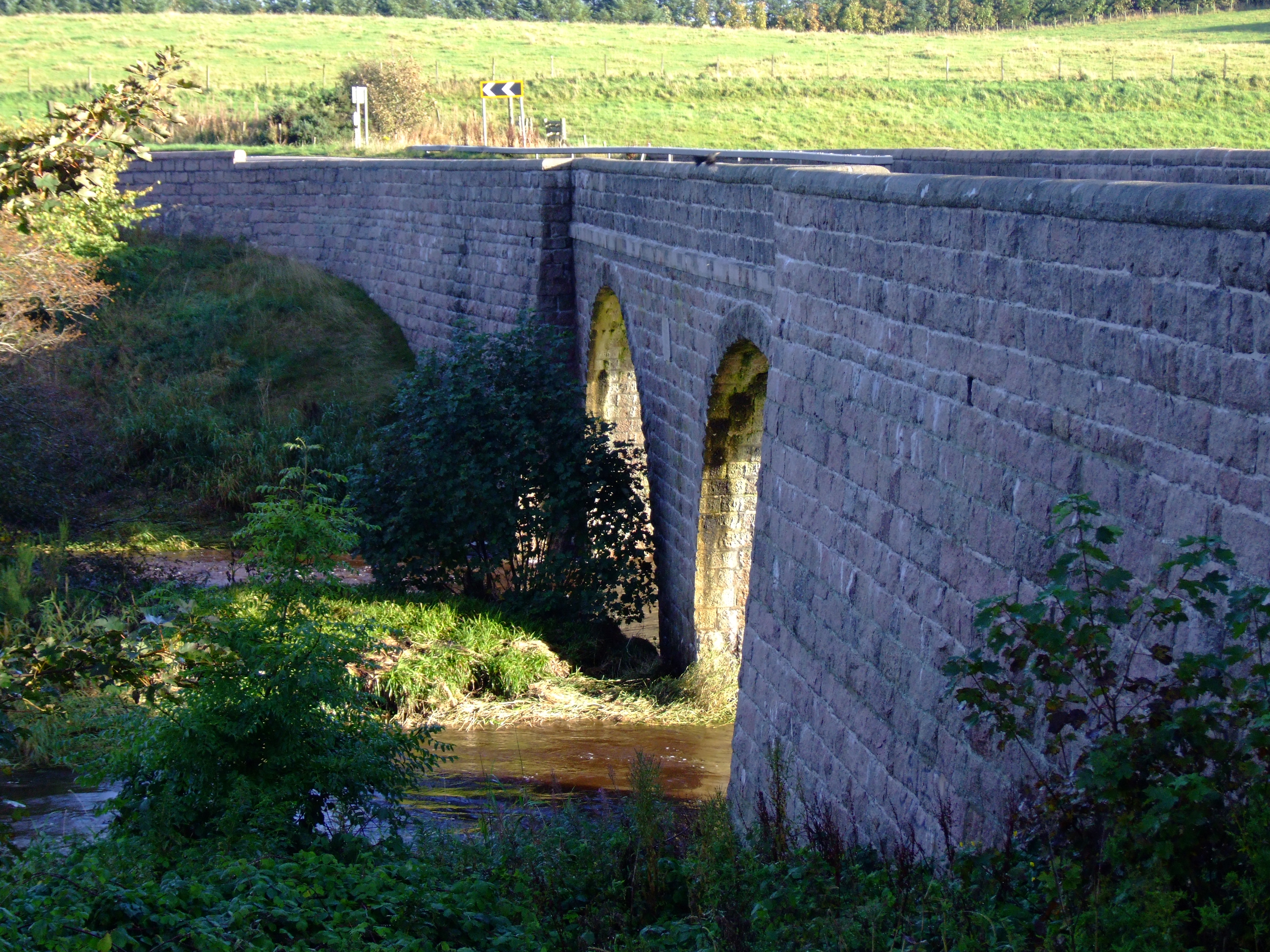
Balmoor Bridge crosses the river just north of Peterhead

(from west to east)

- Old Deer
- Stuartfield
- Mintlaw
- Inverquhomery
- Longside
- Rora
- Newseat
- Inverugie
- Peterhead

== See also ==
- Collie Burn
- Laeca Burn
