= Tay Road Bridge =

Road bridge crossing the River Tay, Scotland

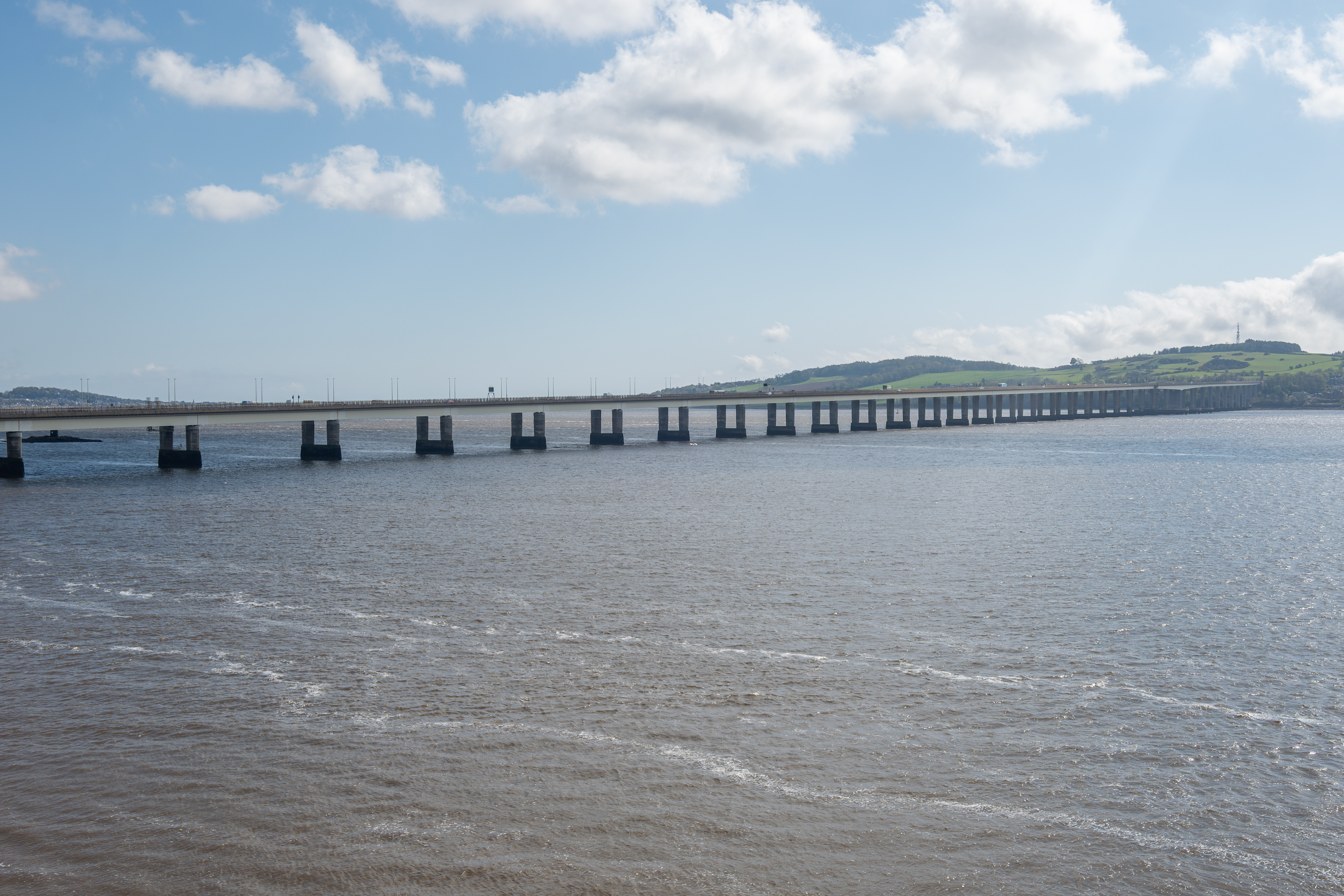
- The Tay Road Bridge, viewed from Dundee with Newport-on-Tay in the background.
- Coordinates: 56.45362°N 2.94968°W
- OS grid reference: NO 41564 29456
- Carries: Motor vehicles, cyclists and pedestrians 4 lanes of A92
- Crosses: Firth of Tay
- Locale: Dundee
- Maintained by: Tay Road Bridge Joint Board

Characteristics
- Total length: 2,250 metres (1.4 mi)

History
- Designer: William A Fairhurst
- Opened: 18 August 1966

Location
- Interactive map of Tay Road Bridge

The Tay Road Bridge carries the A92 road across the Firth of Tay from Newport-on-Tay in Fife to Dundee in Scotland, just downstream of the Tay Rail Bridge. At around 2,250 metres (1.4 mi), it is one of the longest road bridges in Europe, and was opened in 1966, replacing the old Tay ferry.

== History ==
=== Tay ferry service (1873–1966) ===
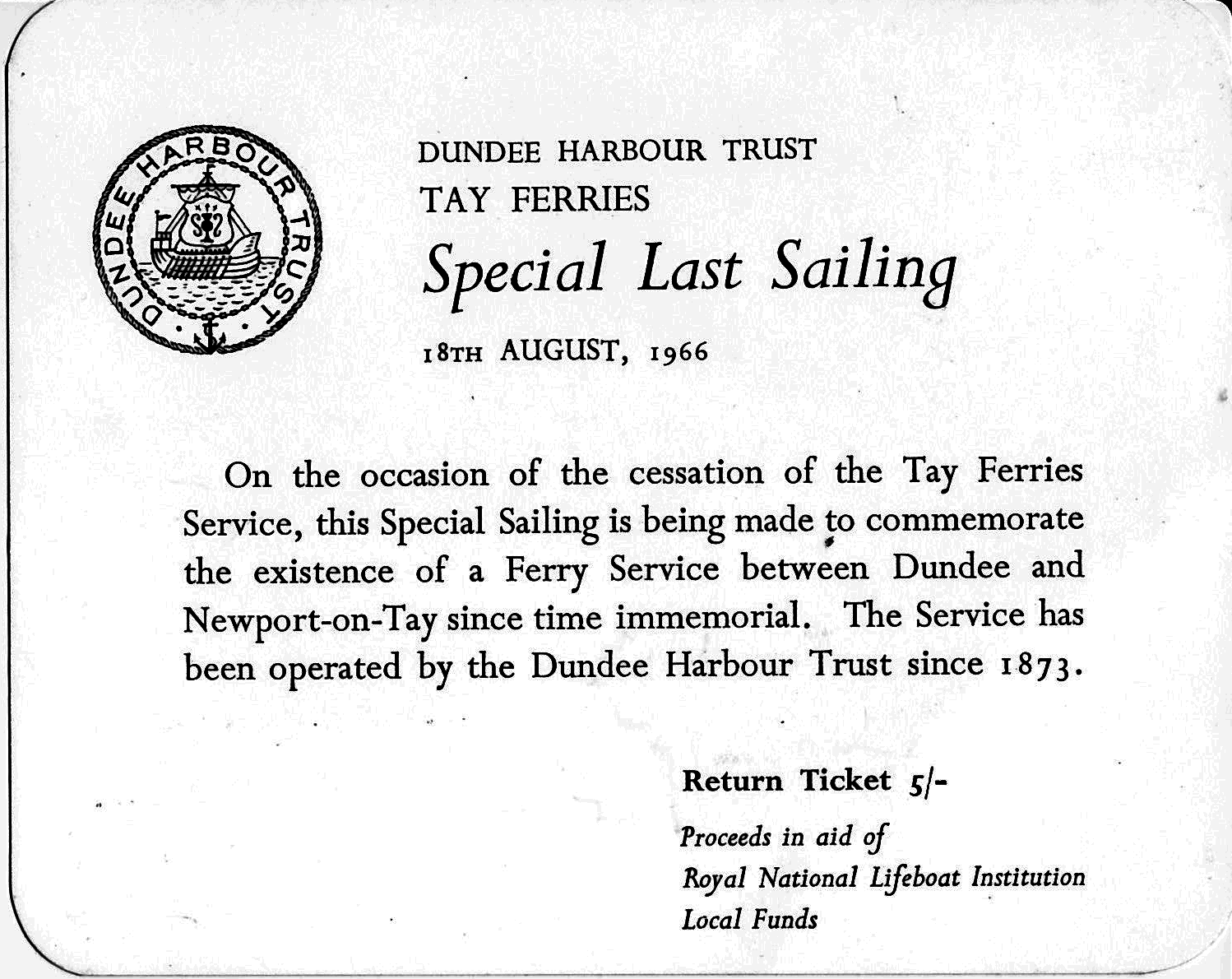
A special ticket for a special event – the last sailing of the Tay ferry.

The Tay Road Bridge was built to replace the former Tay ferry service, popularly known in Dundee as "the Fifie". A passenger and vehicle ferry service across the River Tay operated from Craigie Pier, Dundee, to Newport-on-Tay. Until the opening of the road bridge, three vessels operated the service, namely the B. L. Nairn (a paddle steamer built in 1929); the Abercraig and the Scotscraig (diesel powered, fitted with Voith Schneider propellers and built in the Caledon Shipyard in Dundee). The paddle steamer was only used when the other ferries needed maintenance. The paddle steamer was scrapped while the Scotscraig and Abercraig ended their days in Malta.

The construction of the southern approach road resulted in the railway line from Tayport to Dundee terminating in Newport. The opening of the road bridge in 1966 eventually led to the closure of the line in 1969.

=== Construction ===
Tay Road Bridge Order Confirmation Act 1962
- Act of Parliament
- Parliament of the United Kingdom
- Long title: An Act to confirm a Provisional Order under the Private Legislation Procedure (Scotland) Act, 1936, relating to Tay Road Bridge.
- Citation: 10 & 11 Eliz. 2. c. xxxiii

Dates
- Royal assent: 1 August 1962
Other legislation
| Relates to | Private Legislation Procedure (Scotland) Act 1936 |

Text of statute as originally enacted

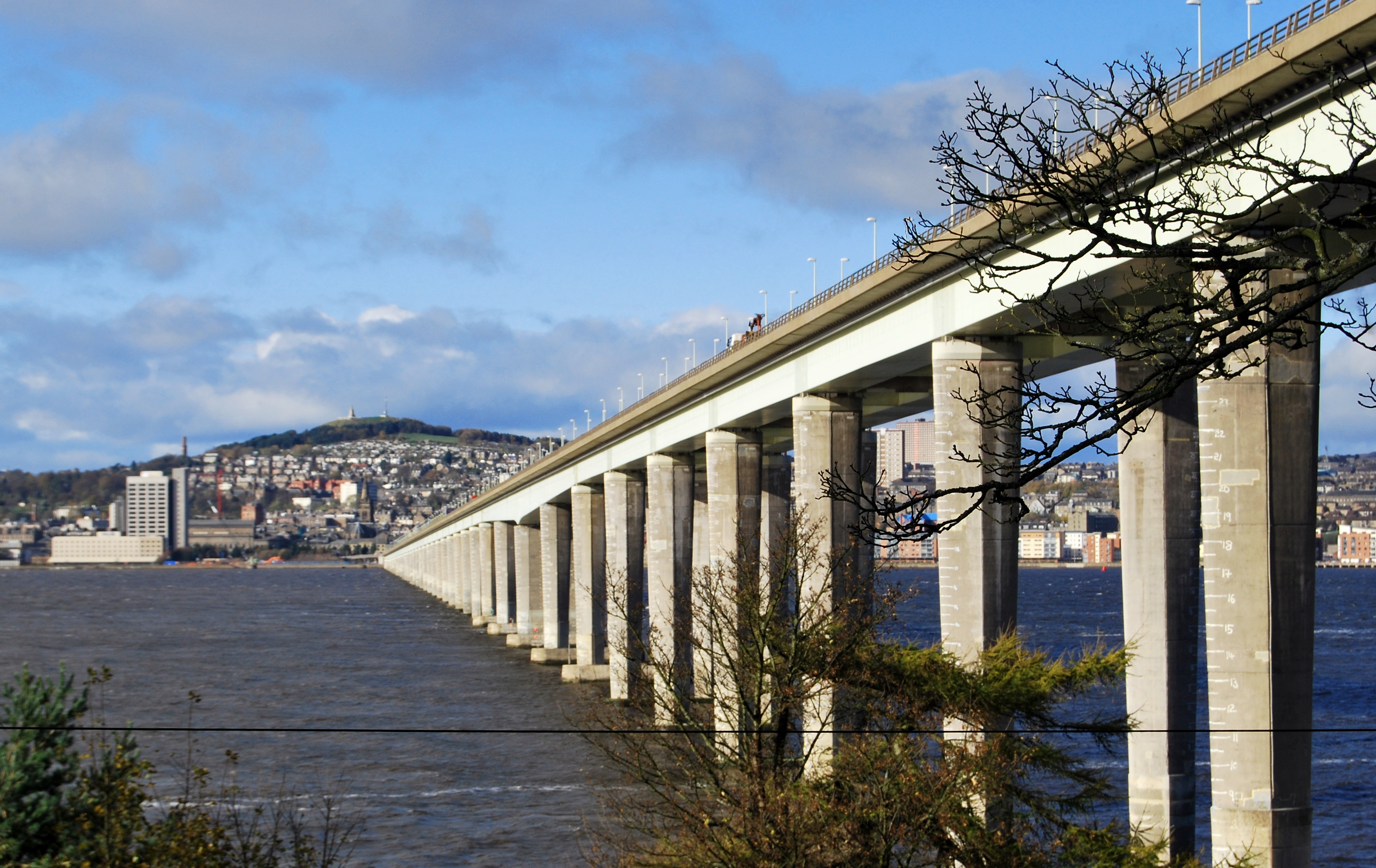
Tay Road Bridge

Tay Road Bridge with traffic moving across it, seen from Dundee Law.

As part of the modernisation projects of the 1950s, a road bridge across the Tay had been considered for several years. In August 1958 a traffic census was undertaken and test bores were taken in order to establish the most suitable location for a bridge crossing. Despite government opposition to the project, local lobbying, led by Dundee businessman Sir Douglas Hardie, brought a final agreement to the cost of the project.

The bridge was approved by the Tay Road Bridge Order Confirmation Act 1962 (10 & 11 Eliz. 2. c. xxxiii). It was designed by consulting engineers WA Fairhurst & Partners of Glasgow and Dundee, under the direct supervision of the firm's founding partner, civil engineer William Fairhurst. Construction began in March 1963 with the infilling of West Graving Dock, King William Dock and Earl Grey docks in Dundee. The civil engineering construction was undertaken by Duncan Logan Construction Ltd. and steelwork by Dorman Long (Bridge and Engineering) Ltd. Controversially, construction required the demolition of Dundee's Royal Arch where Queen Victoria had entered the city on a royal visit. Rubble from the Victoria arch was used as foundations for the on-ramp.

The bridge consists of 42 spans with a navigation channel located closer to the Fife side. During the construction of the bridge, 140,000 tons of concrete, 4,600 tons of mild steel and 8,150 tons of structural steel was used. The bridge has a gradient of 1:81 running from 9.75 m (32.0 ft) above sea-level in Dundee to 38.1 m (125.0 ft) above sea-level in Fife.

=== Opening ===
The bridge took 3 1/2 years to build at a cost of approximately £6 million. Following the installation of the final 65 ton girder on 4 July 1966, the completed bridge was officially opened by the Queen Mother on 18 August 1966. A newsreel of this is available in the British Pathe web archive. For four days, many took advantage of the toll-free period to cross the bridge.

=== 21st century ===
In 2002, a Tay FM competition to find a slogan for the bridge was abandoned after the slogan with the most votes – "It's all downhill to Dundee" – (reflecting the bridge's downward angle) was deemed unsuitable.

In September 2017, after a successful campaign by Wave 102 to give the bridge a nickname, the bridge was officially nicknamed "Steve" by Chris Duke and Councillor Stewart Hunter. The nickname "Steve" won an online poll to nickname the Bridge.

== Features ==
A single path for pedestrians and cyclists is located between the two road carriageways. This is accessed by stairs or a lift on the Dundee side and by ramps on the Fife side. Viewing platforms were once a feature of the bridge, however they were removed in the 1990s.

Traffic lights and barriers at each end of the bridge – can be used to close the road to traffic if the conditions are unsafe. The bridge is closed to double-decker buses if the wind speed exceeds 45mph, to lorries, cyclists and pedestrians if the wind speed exceeds 60mph, and to all traffic at 80mph.

== Commemorations ==
=== Obelisk ===
A 50-foot-tall (15 m) obelisk stands at the Newport side, and a smaller one at the Dundee side, to commemorate Willie Logan, managing director of the company that constructed the bridge who was killed in a plane crash near Inverness, and five workers who died during construction. Both of these obelisks are designed as the piers of the bridge, each representing the height of the piers at that end of the bridge.

=== Anniversaries ===
With the bridge opening formally on 18 August 1966, by the Queen Mother, celebrations to mark anniversaries of the bridge often take place in mid August.

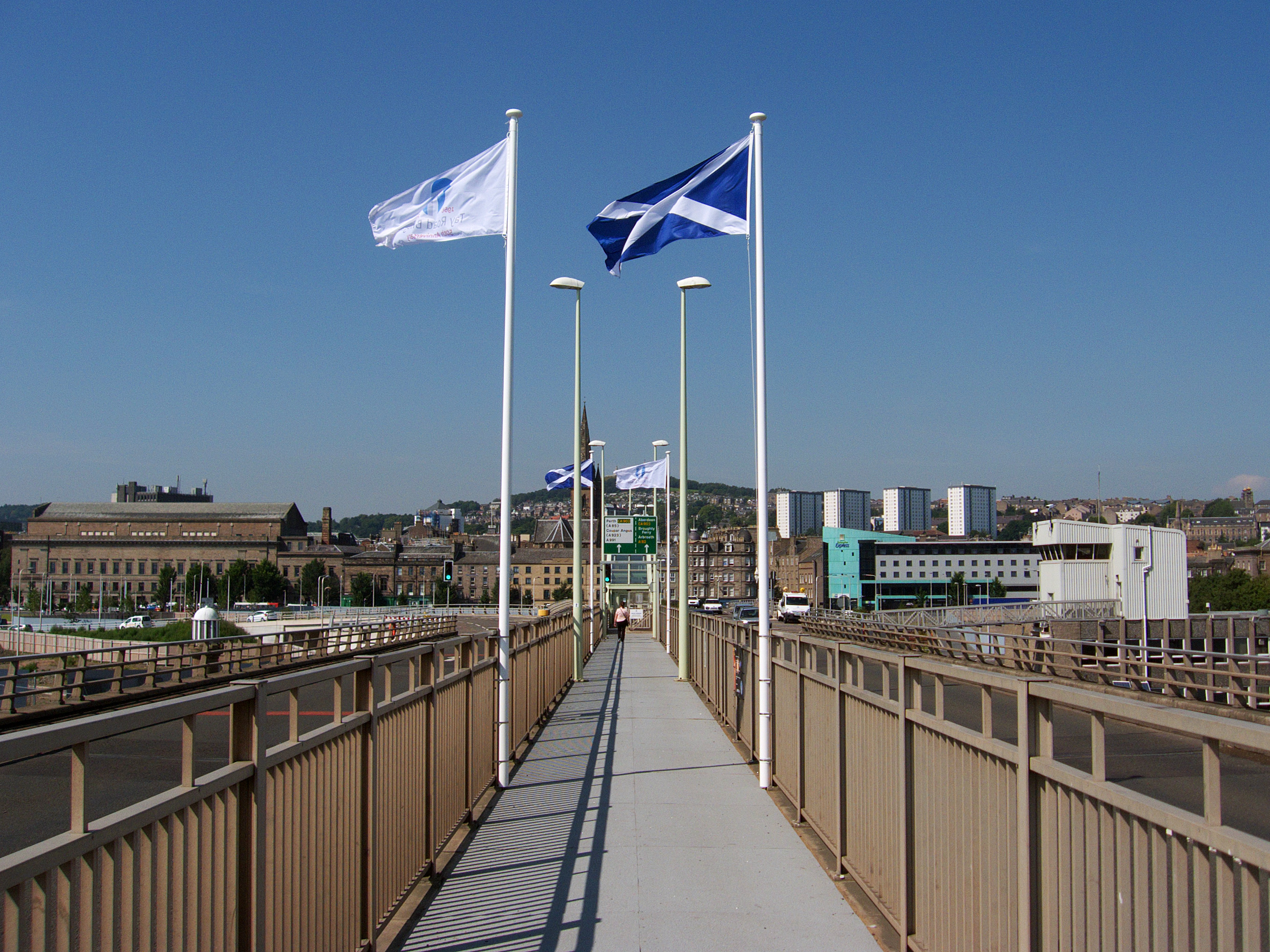
The Tay Road Bridge walkway during the 50th anniversary celebrations in 2016. View from near end of bridge, looking towards Dundee.

For the 50th anniversary, the bridge authorities organised a day of free events on 21 August 2016 to celebrate the occasion.

This was also the case for the bridge’s 60th anniversary in August 2026, which also included a procession of vintage cars, buses, motorcycles and lorries over the bridge crossings.

== Tolls ==
The bridge was originally a bidirectional toll road with the original 1966 toll for motorcycles, cars and goods vehicles of 1/-, 2/6 and 10/-, respectively. Heavy fines were imposed on drivers who broke down on the bridge if they had run out of petrol. On 1 June 1991, one-way tolls were introduced, for southbound traffic only.

The legislation enabling the levying of tolls was renewed by Parliament (originally that of the UK but now the responsibility of the Scottish Government) repeatedly, most recently on 1 March 2006, where the toll remained unchanged. Although motorcycles were exempt; the tolls for cars, buses and heavy goods vehicles were 80p, £1.40 and £2.00, respectively. On 31 May 2007, the Scottish Parliament voted to scrap tolls on all bridges in Scotland. This came into effect at midnight on 10 February 2008.

The bridge employs 20 staff comprising the Bridge Manager, Deputy Manager, and 18 others. These employees are mainly housed in a small administration block to the eastern side of the Dundee end of the bridge.

== See also ==
- List of bridges in Scotland
