= Marywell =

Coordinates: 56.586607°N 2.571443°W

- Location within Angus
- OS grid reference: NO650440
- Council area: Angus
- Lieutenancy area: Angus
- Country: Scotland
- Sovereign state: United Kingdom
- Post town: ARBROATH
- Postcode district: DD11
- Dialling code: 01241
- Police: Scotland
- Fire: Scottish
- Ambulance: Scottish
- UK Parliament: Angus
- Scottish Parliament: Angus South

Marywell is a village in Angus, Scotland, that is north of Arbroath, in the parish of St Vigeans.

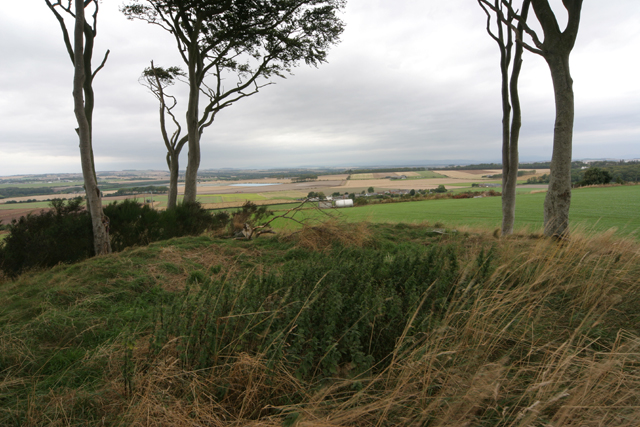
Looking north-west from Dickmontlaw Cairn, above Marywell

== Sources ==
- Marywell in the Gazetteer for Scotland.
