= A923 road =

Road in Scotland

A923

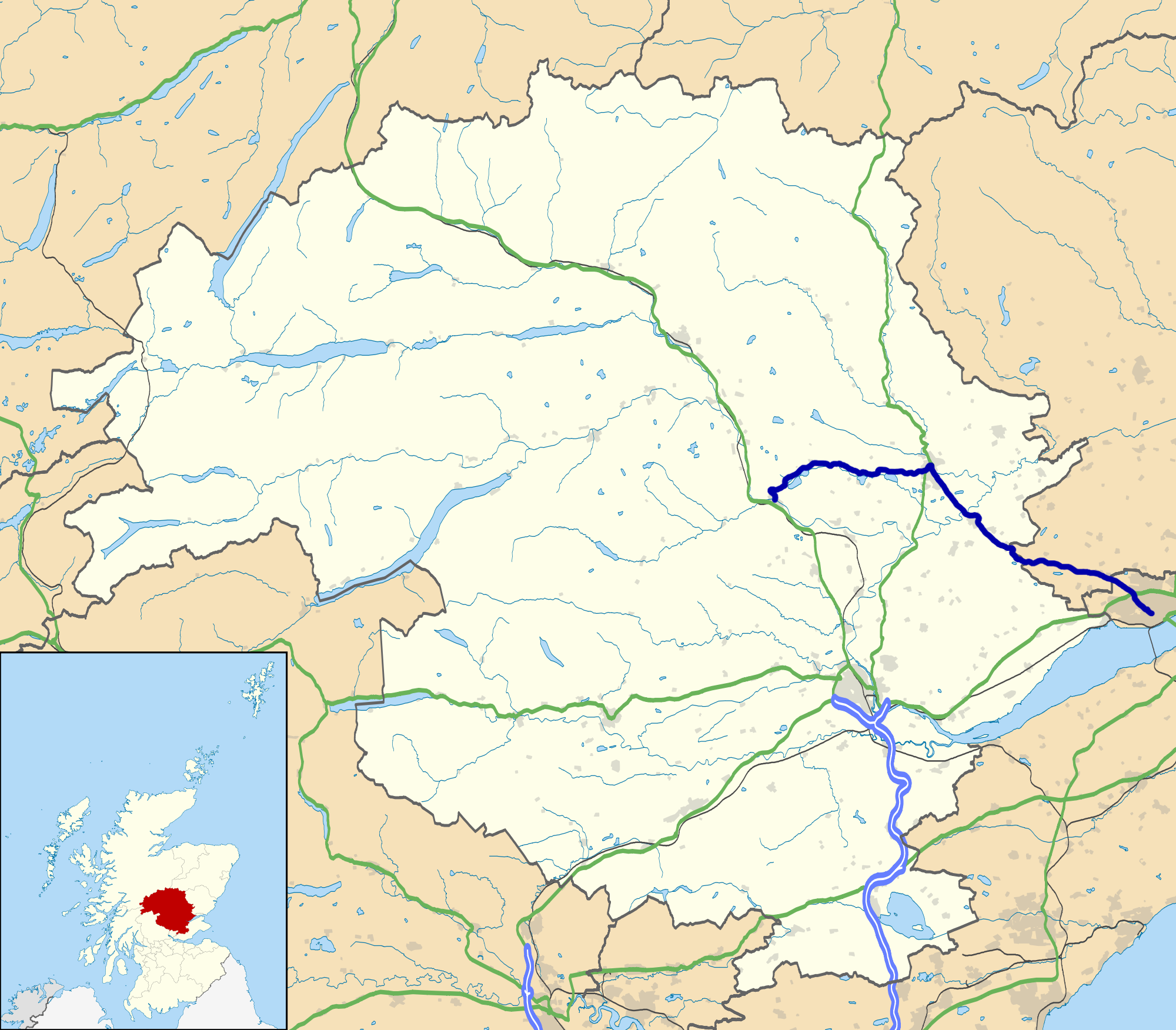

Major junctions
- South end: A991, Dundee
- A90; A94; A93
- Northwest end: A9, Dunkeld

Location
- Country: United Kingdom
- Primary destinations: Birkhill and Muirhead; Coupar Angus; Blairgowrie and Rattray

Road network
- Roads in the United Kingdom; Motorways; A and B road zones

The A923 is a major road in Dundee, Angus and Perth and Kinross, Scotland. It runs from Dundee to Dunkeld. Parts of it between Coupar Angus and Dunkeld follow the route of the Old Military Road, built following the Jacobite Rebellion.
