= A939 road =

Road in Scotland

Coordinates: 57.2628°N 3.51134°W

A939

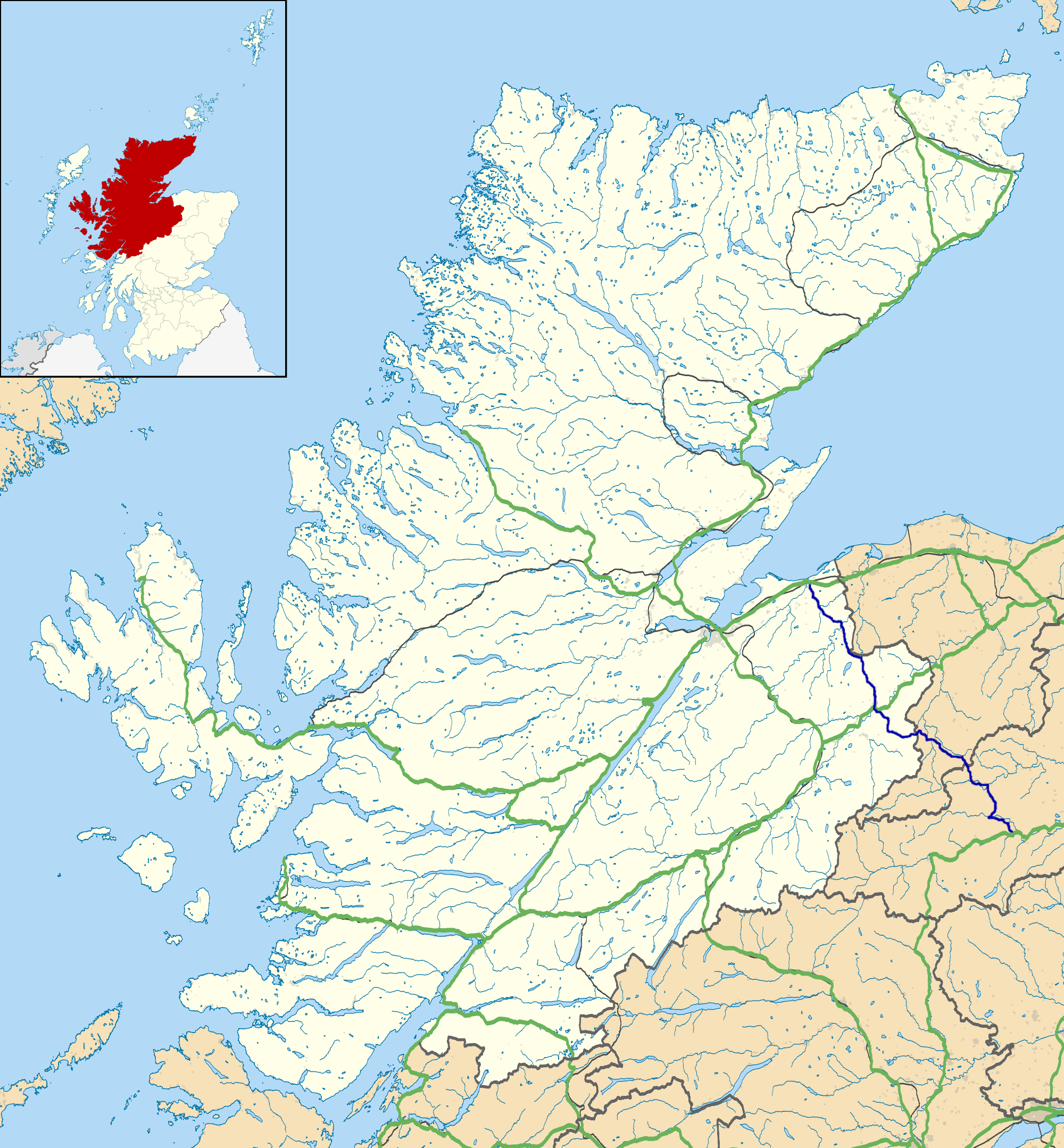

Major junctions
- From: Nairn
- A96 A940; A95 A944; A93
- To: Ballater

Location
- Country: United Kingdom
- Constituent country: Scotland

Road network
- Roads in the United Kingdom; Motorways; A and B road zones

The A939 is a road in Scotland, connecting the A96 at Nairn on the Moray coast with the A95 Grantown-on-Spey. It then continues to the A93 at Ballater by way of the Grampian Mountains, passing Tomintoul and the Lecht Ski Centre.

This road passes over four summits:

1. at Dava Moor 1053 ft (321m),
2. west of Bridge of Brown 1436 ft (438m),
3. at the Lecht Ski Centre 2090 ft (637m),
4. at the Gairnshiel Summit 1836 ft (550m).

On the old A939, now redesignated the B976 between Gairnshiel Bridge and Crathie, the road reaches 1568 ft (478m). The A939 is sometimes the first road in Great Britain closed due to snowfall between Cock Bridge and Tomintoul.
