= A90 road =

Road in Scotland between Edinburgh and Fraserburgh via Dundee and Aberdeen

Coordinates: 57°26′03″N 1°51′38″W

A90

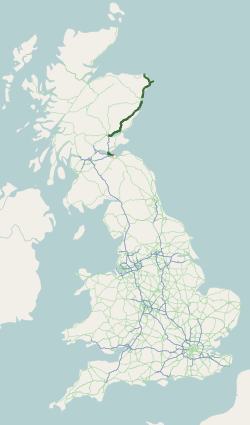

Route information
- Length: 146 mi (235 km)

Major junctions
- South end: Edinburgh
- M9 M90 spur A902 A904 A972; A92; A96
- North end: Fraserburgh

Location
- Country: United Kingdom
- Primary destinations: Perth, Dundee, Forfar, Stonehaven, Aberdeen, Fraserburgh

Road network
- Roads in the United Kingdom; Motorways; A and B road zones
← A89	→ A91

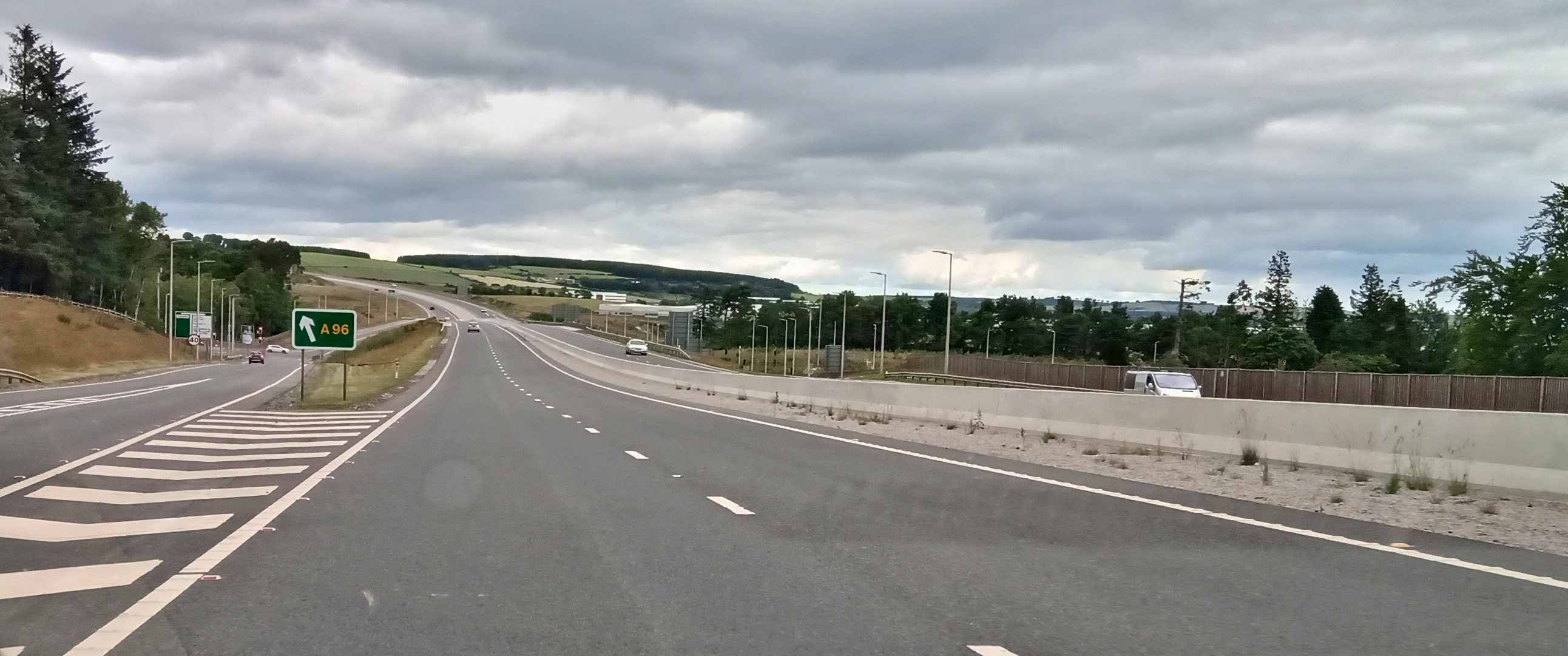
The A90 at the A96 junction near Aberdeen. This stretch is part of the AWPR ("Aberdeen Bypass") project that opened in 2018–19.

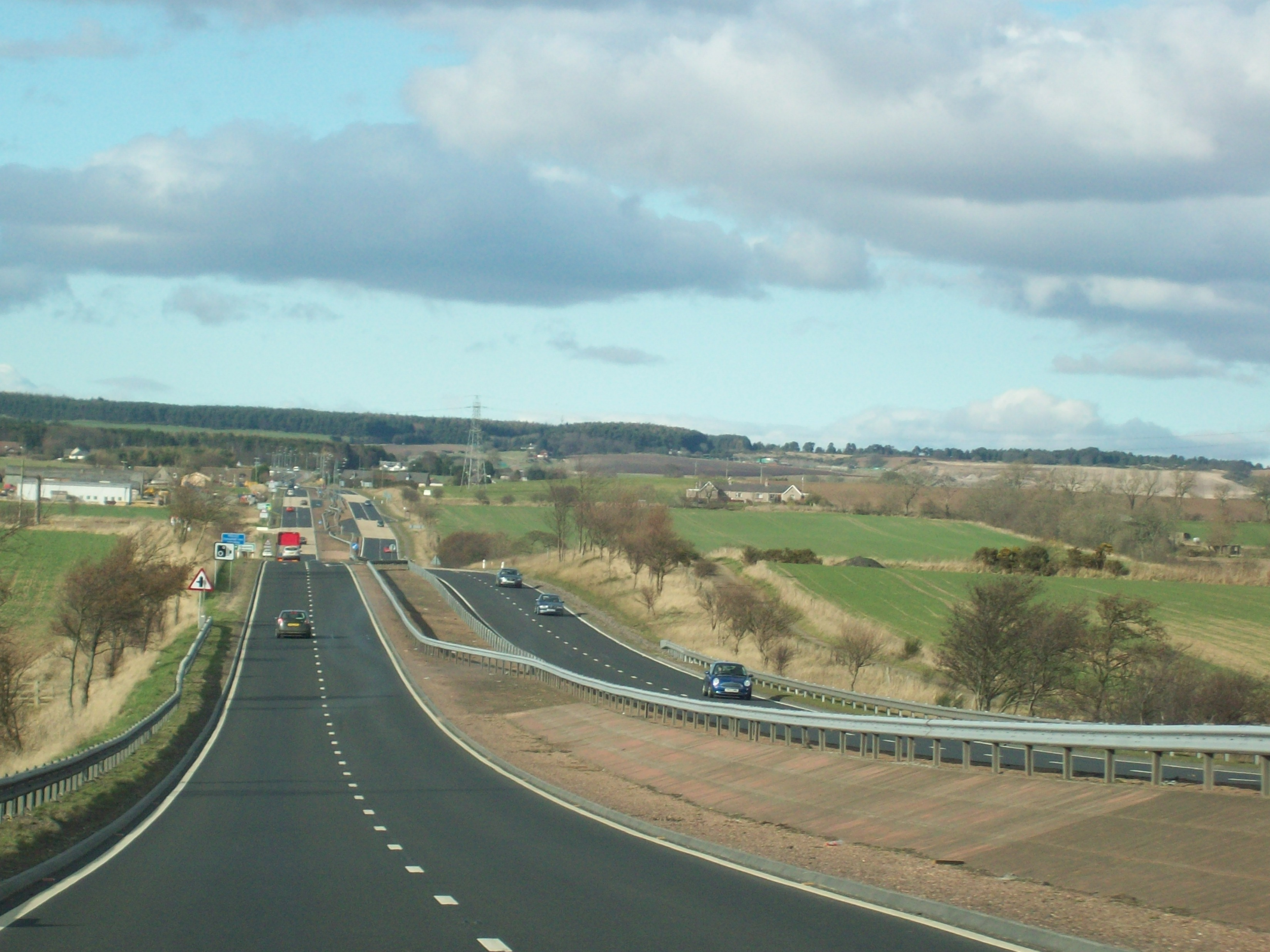
The A90 heading north from Dundee

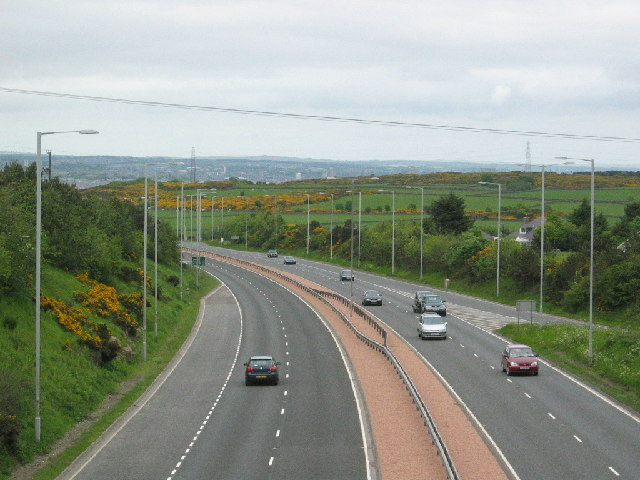
A former stretch of the A90, just south of Aberdeen. Following the opening of the "Aberdeen Bypass", this now forms part of the A92.

The A90 road is a major north-to-south road in eastern Scotland, running from Edinburgh to Fraserburgh, through Dundee and Aberdeen. Along with the A9 and the A82 it is one of the three major north–south trunk roads connecting the Central Belt to northern destinations. The A90 is not continuous: there is a gap between Dalmeny and Perth, but the M90 connects those two places.

== Background ==
The creation and development of the A90 road has to be understood in terms of the development of the economy of the North-East of Scotland, which had resulted in an increase in traffic along the route between Perth and Aberdeen. In recognition of this, in 1979, the British government announced that it was giving priority to the upgrading of the route to dual carriageway standard. It had already been decided that the trunk route between Dundee and Stonehaven, which had previously followed the same route as the railway line between the two towns, would now follow an inland route through Forfar and Laurencekirk. The new route would incorporate the A85 from Perth to Dundee, the A929 between Dundee and Forfar, the A94 between Forfar and Stonehaven, and the A92 from Stonehaven to Aberdeen; in 1994, the confusion of numbers was resolved with the renumbering of these roads and the creation of the A90 (M90) Edinburgh to Aberdeen trunk road. The coastal route from Dundee to Stonehaven was detrunked in 1978, at the same time as the inland route was trunked.

== History ==
In 1994, it was stated that £139 million had been spent since 1979 on upgrades to the then-A90 between Perth and Aberdeen (the section between Stonehaven and Aberdeen has since become part of the A92).

A grade-separated junction at Longforgan was opened in 1996.

The section of the A90 between Balmedie and Tipperty was upgraded to dual carriageway in 2018. On 3 September 2018, the former section of the A90 between Stonehaven and Blackdog was renumbered A92 in preparation for the opening of the Aberdeen Western Peripheral Route, which became the new route of the A90.

== Route ==
From Edinburgh, the A90 travels west and connects to the M90 motorway bypass route that leads to the M9: however, it is only possible to travel northbound when reaching this connection. After connecting with the M90, it runs as a short section of A-road before turning into the M90 properly at the Queensferry Crossing. At Perth, beneath Kinnoull Hill, the M90 again becomes the A90, now running north east to Dundee and through the Kingsway road system. It then passes Forfar, Brechin and Stracathro.

After crossing the Cowie Water just north of Stonehaven, a new junction, opened in 2019, reroutes the A90 road north as part of the Aberdeen Western Peripheral Route (AWPR), bypassing the city to its west past the suburban developments of Peterculter, Milltimber, Westhill and Kingswells, turning east past Aberdeen Airport and Dyce. The section of road previously part of the A90 was made part of the A92 and continues via Newtonhill, Portlethen, Cove Bay, the urban area of Aberdeen and the Bridge of Don before rejoining the A90 at Blackdog Junction, where the A'PRT terminates. Continuing north, the route crosses the Ythan Estuary near Ellon where it becomes a single carriageway, skirting Peterhead (and crossing Balmoor Bridge) on its way to Fraserburgh. The A952 road via Mintlaw is one of Aberdeenshire's principal freight routes.

The Dundee to Aberdeen stretch of the A90 has many speed cameras. Previously, the 60-mile (97 km) trip from Dundee to Aberdeen along the A90 entailed over a dozen speed cameras including a majority of fixed Gatso types as well as locations used by mobile camera vans. These cameras were found on long fast stretches of road, and shortly before dangerous junctions, such as at the Laurencekirk junction where a 50 mph (80 km/h) speed limit is in force. This was introduced due to this junction's appalling safety record. A similar speed restriction was imposed at Forfar until two new grade-separated junctions were built, after which the restriction was lifted. In 2017 Average Speed Cameras were erected between Dundee and Stonehaven, with 15 per side, spaced approximately every 5 miles (8 km) for a total of 30 cameras. BBC News reported in January 2018 that speed limit compliance had increased from 2 in 5 to 99 in 100 drivers.

A short stretch of the A90, from the southern terminus of the M90 to Barnton Junction (a junction with the A902), is part of Euroroute E15, which runs from Inverness to Algeciras in Spain. The E15 continues northwards on the M90, and southwards on the A902 leading to the Edinburgh City Bypass.

The A90 ran along the coast and through Aberdeen until the city was bypassed with the opening of the Aberdeen Western Peripheral Route in 2018. The former stretch of A90 from Stonehaven through to just north of Aberdeen is now part of the A92.

== Future ==
In January 2016 the Scottish Government announced £24 million for the design and construction of a new grade-separated junction at Laurencekirk on the A90. Ground investigations were carried out in 2019 in preparation for upgrading the flat junction between the A90 and the A937 to a flyover after a number of deaths. This followed years of local campaigning. However, in 2021 it was announced that work had been delayed. The proposed flyover would require the closure of a flat crossing at Oatyhill Farm which is now the sole access point to some properties after the nearby 170-year-old Oatyhill Bridge, which crosses the Dundee–Aberdeen line, was closed to road traffic in 2020. However, supplementary draft Orders and an Environmental Impact Assessment Report (Addendum) was published in December 2024 to facilitate the necessary works required at Oatyhill to allow the flyover to be built.

Dualling of the section north of Aberdeen has been subject to studies since the 1980s. A proposal was published in 2007 for dualling the section between Balmedie and Tipperty. While the Balmedie to Tipperty segment was eventually dualled as part of wider AWPR works, in 2023 the Scottish Government said it had no plans to dual the route north of Ellon.

== River crossings ==
A90 bridges span numerous rivers, estuaries and burns including:

- Carron Water
- Cowie Water
- Burn of Muchalls
- Burn of Pheppie
- Burn of Elsick
- River Dee
- River Don
- Ythan Estuary
- River Tay (via Friarton Bridge)
- Firth of Forth (via Queensferry Crossing)
- River North Esk
- River Ugie (via Balmoor Bridge)

== Incidents ==
- Suicide of Kimberly Milne – death of a woman who jumped from a bridge over the A90 into oncoming traffic in July 2023. Her abusive husband was found guilty of culpable homicide in the first case of its kind.

== See also ==
- A roads in Zone 9 of the Great Britain numbering scheme
- Causey Mounth
- Aberdeen Western Peripheral Route (AWPR)
