= Balmirmer =

Coordinates: 56.539309°N 2.686183°W

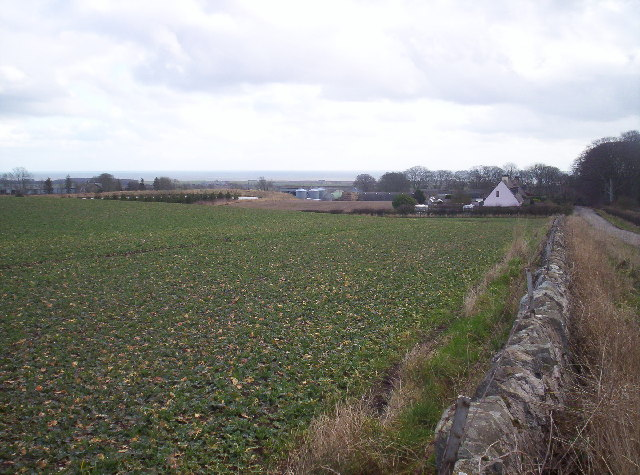
- West Balmirmer farm and cottages

- Location within Angus
- OS grid reference: NO579388
- Council area: Angus
- Lieutenancy area: Angus
- Country: Scotland
- Sovereign state: United Kingdom
- Post town: CARNOUSTIE
- Postcode district: DD7
- Dialling code: 01241
- Police: Scotland
- Fire: Scottish
- Ambulance: Scottish
- UK Parliament: Dundee East
- Scottish Parliament: Angus; North East Scotland

Balmirmer is a hamlet in the council area of Angus, Scotland. It is situated 2 miles (3 km) north-east of Carnoustie and 4 miles (6 km) west of Arbroath. The hamlet is the location of West Balmirmer Farm, the birthplace of Margaret Fairlie, the first woman to hold a university chair in Scotland.

== Notable residents ==
- Margaret Fairlie (1891-1963), academic and gynecologist, first woman to hold professorial chair in Scotland

== See also ==
- Carnoustie
