= Blackdog =

Hamlet in Aberdeenshire, Scotland

Coordinates: 57.219°N 02.069°W

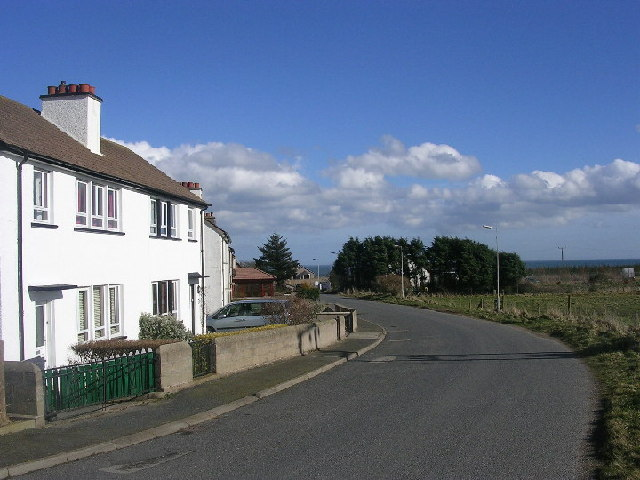
- Houses at Blackdog with the North Sea in the distance

- Location within Aberdeenshire Location near the Aberdeen City council area
- OS grid reference: NJ958141
- Council area: Aberdeenshire
- Lieutenancy area: Aberdeenshire
- Country: Scotland
- Sovereign state: United Kingdom
- Post town: ABERDEEN
- Postcode district: AB23
- Dialling code: 01224
- Police: Scotland
- Fire: Scottish
- Ambulance: Scottish
- UK Parliament: Gordon and Buchan
- Scottish Parliament: Aberdeenshire East

Blackdog is a hamlet approximately 2 miles north of the limits of the Aberdeen City council area in Scotland.

The nearby area serves as a shooting ground, and is used by the British Army for training.

In WW2, the beaches near Blackdog were mined in response to fears of a German invasion, resulting in several fatalities. 10 March 1941 at North Beaches of Blackdog, Sapper Leslie Alfred Whitney - Royal Engineers (age 23) when a "toadstool" he was arming detonated. 17 March 1941 at Millden Links, Corporal Charles Crowe - Gordon Highlanders (age 24) and on 18 March 1941 at Millden Links, Private Colin Innes - Gordon Highlanders (age 22) were all killed by landmines.

The minefields were cleared in 1944 by 11th Company Royal Engineers Bomb Disposal, during the clear up a Wasp (converted Bren gun carrier) used for flamethrowing to burn off vegetation was blown up when it hit a mine. One person lost a hand and several were injured.

A public house called The Black Dog can be found in the nearby suburb of Bridge of Don, Aberdeen.

It is the location of the onshore substation of the European Offshore Wind Deployment Centre.

An interchange at Blackdog marks the northern end of the Aberdeen Western Peripheral Route, a bypass around Aberdeen. A four-mile (7 km) stretch between Parkhill and Blackdog opened in June 2018.
