= Carse of Gowrie =

Area of Perth and Kinross, Scotland

Coordinates: 56.41172°N 3.16847°W

Carse of Gowrie: Scottish Gaelic: Càrrsa Gobhraidh
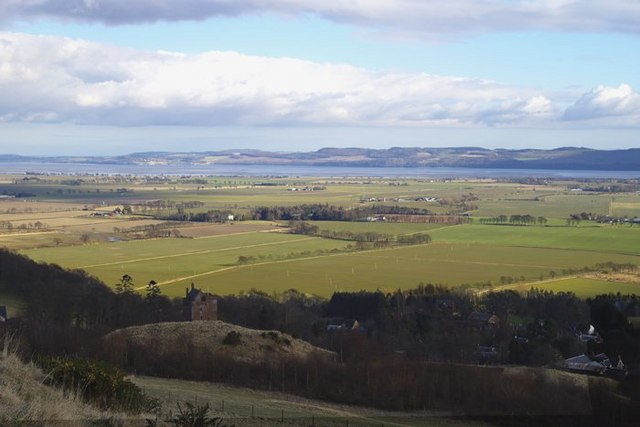
- Looking over Kinnaird village to the Carse of Gowrie, the River Tay and Fife beyond

- Location within Scotland
- Country: Scotland
- Sovereign state: United Kingdom
- Police: Scotland
- Fire: Scottish
- Ambulance: Scottish

The Carse of Gowrie is a stretch of low-lying country in the southern part of Gowrie, Perth and Kinross, Scotland. It stretches for about 20 miles (30 kilometres) along the north shore of the Firth of Tay between Perth and Dundee. The area offers high-quality agricultural land and is well known as a major area for strawberry, raspberry and general fruit growing. Fruit is easy to cultivate in the area because of its southerly aspect and low rainfall. It has been suggested that monks brought new varieties of apples and pears to the area in the Middle Ages and there may have been vineyards growing on slopes near the River Tay.

== Landscape history ==
The landscape of the Carse was created by glacial process and for part of the Mesolithic period the Carse of Gowrie was under water. Fertile fluvioglacial soils made the Carse a good place to settle and farm. Perth burgesses and local lords led the initial drainage and cultivation, extending the areas of oat, barley and wheat yielding arable land beyond the old settlements such as Errol and Inchture. Norman nobles built castles at Megginch, Kinnaird and Fingask in the twelfth century. The Hay lords of Errol granted salmon netting rights at Clashbenny and Red Sands to Lindores Abbey in that period.

Groome's Ordnance gazetteer of Scotland, dating from the mid-1880s, describes Carse of Gowrie as having consisted of a series of isolated mounds, known as inches, surrounded by less well-drained land with stagnant pools still evident in 1760. The word inch, meaning an island, is still present in placenames such as the Inchmichael farms, the castle of Megginch, the village of Inchture and hamlet of Inchyra. The area was drained by cutting a number of artificial ditches many of which are known locally as pows (e.g. Pow of Glencarse, Grange Pow, Pow of Errol).

In his travels preacher John Wesley described the Carse in May 1768 thus: "We rode through the pleasant and fruitful Carse of Gowry, a plain 15 or 16 miles (24 or 26 kilometres) long, between the river Tay and the mountains, very thickly inhabited, to Perth".

A great turnpike road was built through the Carse between Perth and Dundee in about 1800 (now the A90), and was connected by branch roads to Errol's local harbours on the Tay at Port Allen and Powgavie. Prior to this, according to historian Lawrence Melville, the routes between places were 'mere bridle tracks' and the main way of travelling between Perth and Dundee was on the River Tay by sailing ship or steamboat.

The Dundee and Perth Railway was created by Act of Parliament on 31 July 1845 and built a standard-gauge line through the Carse with stations at or near several villages including Invergowrie, Inchture, Errol, Glencarse and Kinfauns.

The Errol Clay formations were exploited extensively from the nineteenth century to make bricks, drainage tiles and pantiles for roofing at works at Inchcoonans, Falla, Pitfour and Waterybutts. Some older buildings in the area were built of clay and a few survive.

The Carse of Gowrie Sustainability Group are involved in Carse-wide environmental projects such as the Patrick Matthew trail which includes St Madoes, the Megginch estate, Inchture and Invergowrie. The group aim to develop relationships between communities, local authorities and the Scottish government to address local environmental issues.

The Carse Churches is a group of four Church of Scotland parish congregations with a ministry team (Abernyte, Inchture, Kinnaird and Longforgan).

The Carse Association for Continuing Education is a voluntary group founded in 1995 which organises adult education classes in church and village halls, primary schools and other social spaces.

=== Surrounding hills ===
Rossie Hill is 3.8 miles (6.1 km) to the north, rising to 564 feet (172 m). Nearby, Dron Hill is 4.4 miles (7.1 km) to the north, with a summit of 683 feet (208 m).

== Constituent villages ==
The main villages in the Carse of Gowrie are:

- Errol
- Glencarse
- Inchyra
- Inchture
- Invergowrie
- Kinfauns
- Kinnaird
- Leetown
- Longforgan
- St Madoes
