= Inchture Village railway station =

Former railway station in Scotland

Coordinates: 56.4434°N 3.1742°W

Inchture Village railway station was a railway station in the village of Inchture, Perthshire, Scotland.

The Inchture Railway Bus service operated a service from its junction at Inchture railway station northwards along a one and a half mile stretch to the village of Inchture. Although operated by the Caledonian Railway (as part of the Dundee and Perth Railway), this was not a railway in the true sense, but a horse-drawn tramway. It began service in 1848 and during its peak ran six return journeys on weekdays, before it eventually closed on 1 January 1917. The building which used to house the tramcar still exists today in the form of a private house, with the outlines of the former garage doors still clearly visible.
