= Kenyon Wright =

Scottish politician (1932–2017)

Canon Kenyon Edward Wright CBE (31 August 1932 – 11 January 2017) was a priest of the Scottish Episcopal Church and a political campaigner. Wright chaired the Scottish Constitutional Convention (1989–1999), which laid the groundwork for the creation of the devolved Scottish Parliament in 1999.

== Early life ==
Wright was born in Paisley in Scotland on 31 August 1932, the son of a textile technician. He attended Paisley Grammar School and Glasgow University, where he graduated with an MA (Hons.) degree in mathematics and philosophy. He then studied for a further degree at Fitzwilliam House, Cambridge, where he was awarded a lower-second class in Part II of the theological tripos in 1955.

== Ministry ==
From 1955, he served as a Methodist missionary in India and in 1963 was appointed Director of the Ecumenical, Social and Industrial Institute in Durgapur, India.

In 1970, he returned to the United Kingdom as Director of Urban Ministry, at Coventry Cathedral and then in 1974 was promoted to Canon Residentiary at the Cathedral and Director of its International Ministry.

In 1981, he came back to Scotland and became General Secretary of the Scottish Council of Churches. In 1990, he became Director of Kairos (Centre for a Sustainable Society). In 1994 he took up the post of Priest-in-Charge of All Saints Church in Glencarse.

== Campaigning for a Scottish Parliament ==
Canon Wright was a long-time campaigner for Scottish devolution. He had been a member of the Labour Party but let this lapse to be able to work as part of the cross-party Scottish Constitutional Convention.

He became the executive chairman of the convention and opened the first meeting on 30 March 1989. The convention was aimed at drawing up a blueprint for Scottish devolution and included representatives of local government, the Scottish Churches, Trade Unions, Small Business Federation and the Scottish Labour, Liberal Democrat and Green parties. The Scottish Conservative Party and Scottish National Party declined to be involved. The task of finding a consensus among the participating groups remained formidable, the Conservative Secretary of State for Scotland, Malcolm Rifkind, was reported as saying "if the disparate parties reached a common conclusion he would jump off the roof of the Scottish Office". Nevertheless, on St Andrew's Day 1990, the convention delivered its first report recommending a legislature elected by proportional representation financed by assigned revenues from taxes raised in Scotland.

Of course, any agreement which was rejected by the Conservative government of Margaret Thatcher could not become law. Wright responded to this political reality by appealing to the idea of Scottish popular sovereignty. At the first meeting of the Convention he famously remarked: "What if that other voice we all know so well responds by saying, 'We say no, and we are the state',? Well we say yes – and we are the people."

In 1997, when the Labour party came to power in the United Kingdom, the convention formed the basis of the Scotland Act that the Secretary of State for Scotland Donald Dewar successfully steered through the Westminster Parliament. However, the Labour Party also insisted on a referendum before the Scottish Parliament came into being. During this 1997 referendum, Wright was a prominent campaigner for the "yes/yes" vote.

== Political life after the convention ==
At the first election to the Scottish Parliament in 1999, he stood as an independent candidate in the West of Scotland region but was not successful.

He joined the Scottish Liberal Democrats in 2000, having stayed out of party politics as chairman of the convention. In 2001 he stood as a candidate in the Banff and Buchan by-election for the Scottish Liberal Democrats, unsuccessfully contesting the Scottish Parliamentary seat vacated by the resignation of Alex Salmond. In the 2003 Scottish Parliamentary Elections, he contested the Stirling constituency.

Wright also backed calls for a Devolved English parliament.

In the 2014 Scottish independence referendum, he supported a Yes vote.

== Later life and death ==
In 2008, Canon Wright retired from working as a priest and returned to live in the English Midlands. He died at his home in Stratford-upon-Avon on 11 January 2017 at the age of 84.

Memorial services were held in Coventry Cathedral on 3 March 2017 and at St Mary's Episcopal Cathedral, Edinburgh, on 10 March 2017.

== Awards and honours ==
Wright was made a Commander of the Order of the British Empire (CBE) in the 1999 Birthday Honours for services to constitutional reform and devolution in Scotland.

He was a Fellow of the Scottish Council for Development and Industry.

== Published works ==
- Wright, Kenyon; Conroy, Harry (1997). The people say yes : the making of Scotland's parliament. Argyll, Scotland: Argyll Pub. OCLC 37753948.
- Wright, Kenyon (2002). Hamish Scott Henderson, 11 November 1919-8 March 2002. Edinburgh: St. Mary's Cathedral. OCLC 316543093.
- Wright, Kenyon (2012). Coventry – cathedral of peace : healing the wounds of history in international reconciliation. Edinburgh: Bloomington, Ind. : AuthorHouse. ISBN 9781468585797. OCLC 813400969.

== Sources ==
- Kenyon Wright Profile BBC politics 1997 (accessed 16 June 2007)
