= Ninewells railway station =

Short-lived railway station in Ninewells, Dundee

Coordinates: 56°27′17″N 3°01′33″W

Ninewells

General information
- Location: Ninewells, Dundee; Scotland

Other information
- Status: Disused

History
- Original company: Dundee and Perth Railway

Key dates
- June 1864: Opened
- October 1865: Closed
Location

Ninewells railway station served the area of Ninewells, Dundee, Scotland from 1864 to 1865 on the Dundee and Perth Railway.

== History ==
The station opened in June 1864 by the Dundee and Perth Railway. It closed to both passengers and goods traffic in October 1865.

| Preceding station | Historical railways | Following station |
|---|---|---|
| Dundee West; Line open, station closed | Dundee and Perth Railway | Invergowrie; Line open, station open |
