= Barnhill railway station, Perth =

Disused railway station in Barnhill, Perth and Kinross

Coordinates: 56.3880°N 3.4213°W

Barnhill
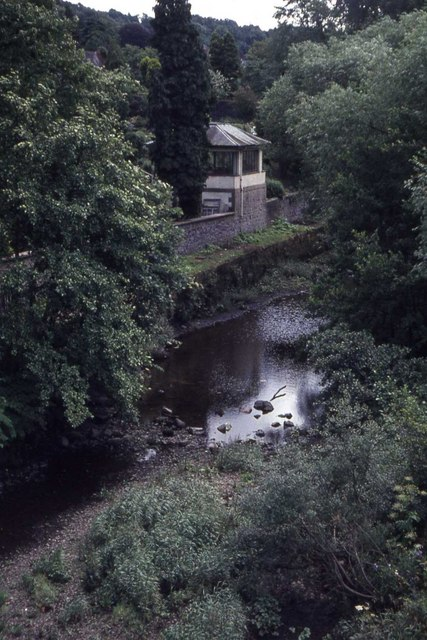
- Remnants of the station in 1974

General information
- Location: Barnhill, Perth and Kinross; Scotland
- Platforms: 2

Other information
- Status: Disused

History
- Original company: Dundee and Perth Railway

Key dates
- 24 May 1847: Opened
- 1 March 1849: Closed
Location

Barnhill railway station served the suburb of Barnhill, Perth and Kinross, Scotland, from 1847 to 1849 by the Dundee and Perth Railway.

== History ==
This short-lived station opened on 24 May 1847 by the Dundee and Perth Railway. It provided a terminus from Dundee West until the line was extended to Perth on 1 March 1849 when the station closed.

Preceding station	Historical railways	Following station
Kinfauns; Line open, station closed	Dundee and Perth Railway	Perth Princes Street; Line open, station closed
