= Magdalen Green railway station =

Disused railway station in Dundee, Scotland

Coordinates: 56.4532°N 2.9972°W

Magdalen Green
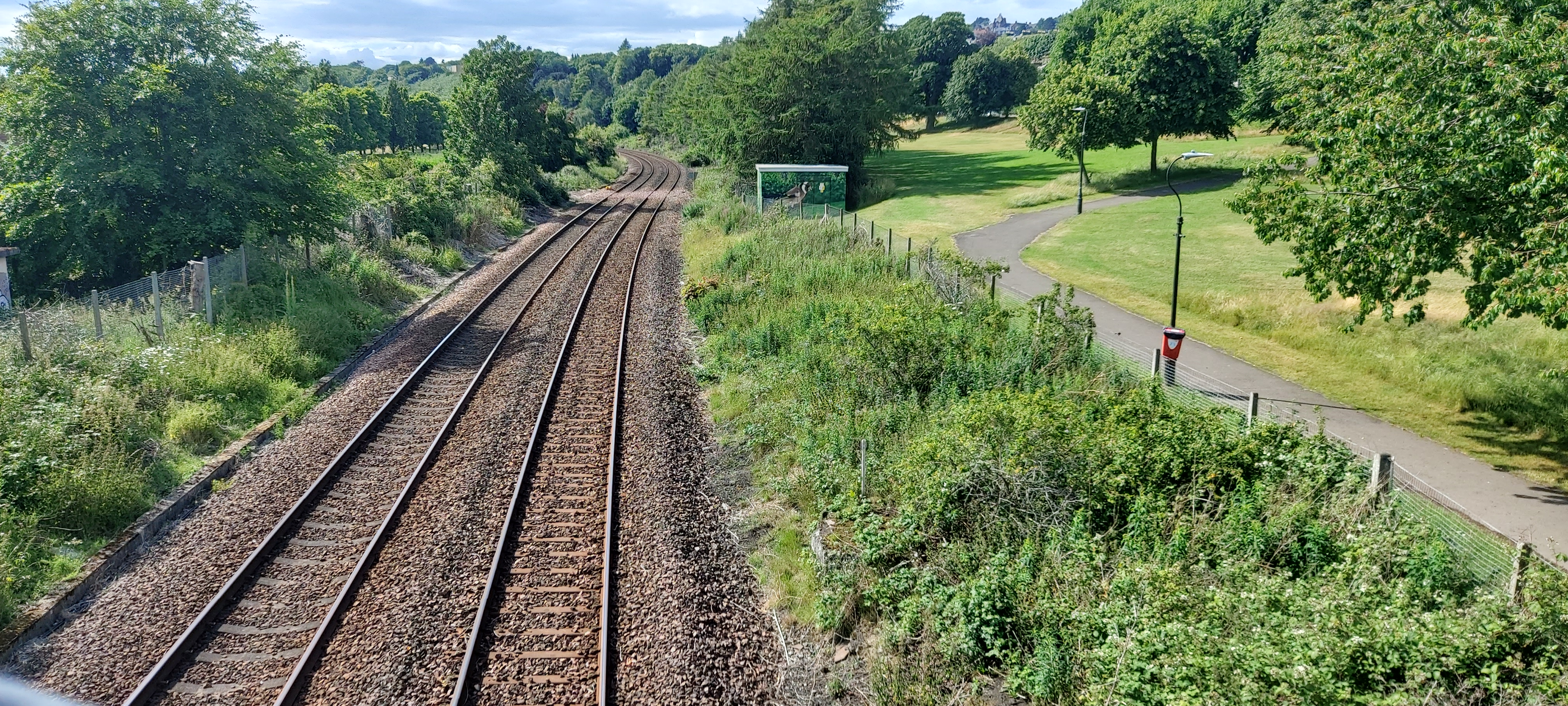
- This picture was taken from the footbridge, which is the only surviving element of the otherwise demolished station. However, the fence begins to form a bay shape near the green shed, which would have cleared a space for the platform.

General information
- Location: Magdalen Green, Dundee; Scotland
- Platforms: 2

Other information
- Status: Disused

History
- Original company: Dundee and Perth Railway
- Pre-grouping: Caledonian Railway
- Post-grouping: London, Midland and Scottish Railway

Key dates
- 1 June 1878: Opened
- 11 June 1956: Closed
Location

Magdalen Green railway station served the area of Magdalen Green, Dundee, Scotland from 1878 to 1956 on the Dundee and Perth Railway.

== History ==
The station opened on 1 June 1878 by the Dundee and Perth Railway. The station building was on the eastbound platform but there was no signal box until 1925. It closed to both passengers and goods traffic on 11 June 1956.

Preceding station	Historical railways	Following station
Dundee West; Line open, station closed	Dundee and Perth Railway	Ninewells; Line open, station closed
