= Patrick Matthew =

Scottish grain merchant, fruit farmer, forester, and landowner

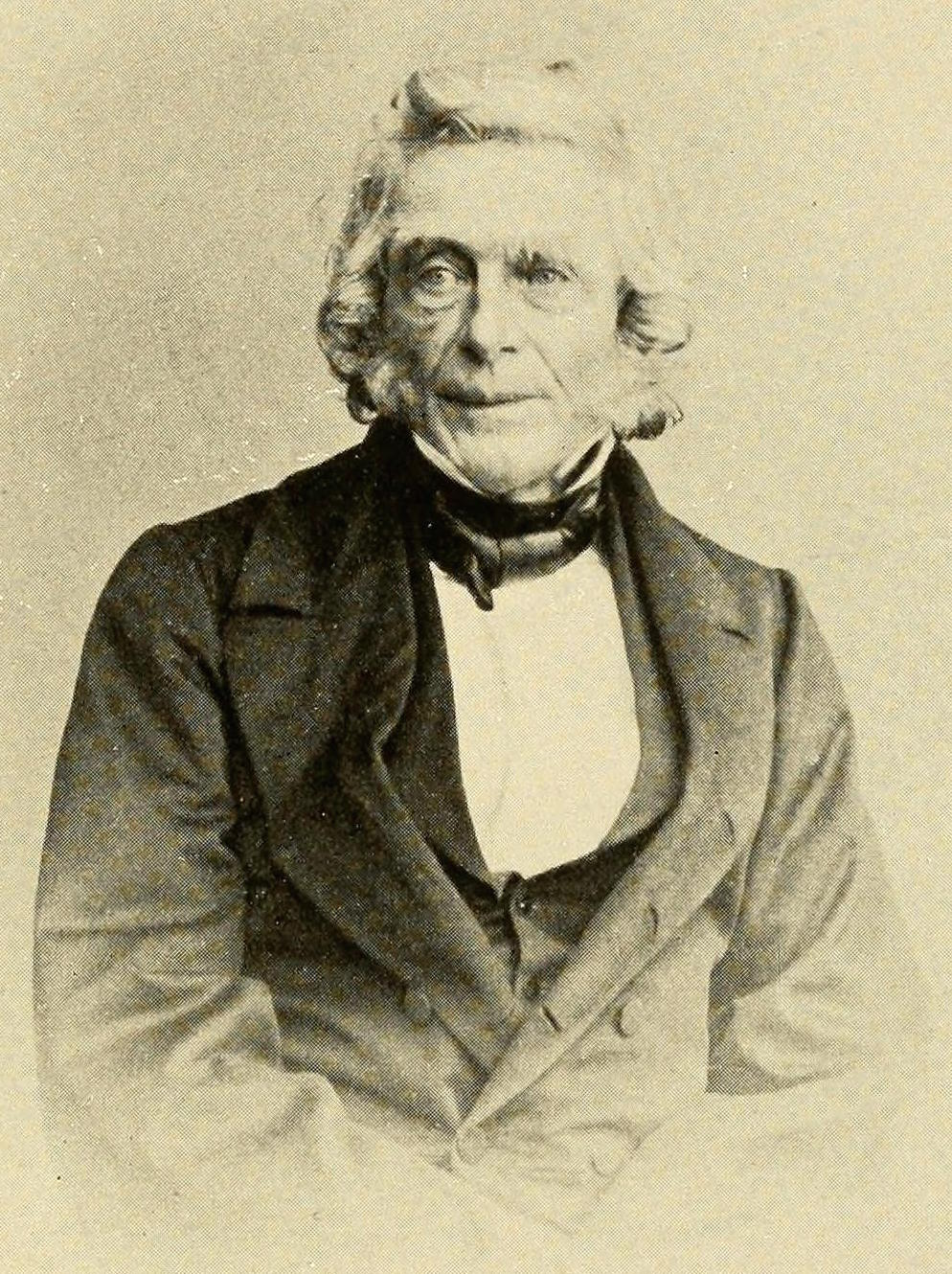
- Born: 20 October 1790; Near Scone Palace, Perthshire, Scotland, Kingdom of Great Britain
- Died: 8 June 1874 (aged 83)
- Burial place: Errol, Perth and Kinross, Scotland, United Kingdom
- Education: University of Edinburgh
- Known for: Early evolutionary theory
- Spouse: Christian Nicol (m. 1817)
- Children: 8

Patrick Matthew (20 October 1790 – 8 June 1874) was a Scottish grain merchant, fruit farmer, forester, and landowner, who contributed to the understanding of horticulture, silviculture, and agriculture in general, with a focus on maintaining the British navy and feeding new colonies. He published the basic concept of natural selection as a mechanism in evolutionary adaptation and speciation (directional selection) and species constancy or stasis (stabilizing selection) in 1831 in a book called Naval Timber and Arboriculture in which he uses the phrase "the natural process of selection". He did not further publicly develop his ideas until after Darwin and Wallace published their theories of evolution by natural selection in 1859. It has been suggested that Darwin and/or Wallace had encountered Matthew's earlier work, but there is no evidence of this. After the publication of On the Origin of Species, Darwin became aware of Matthew's 1831 book and subsequent editions of The Origin include an acknowledgment that Matthew "gives precisely the same view on the origin of species as that" given in the "present volume".

== Biography ==
Patrick Matthew was born 20 October 1790 at Rome, a farm held by his father John Matthew near Scone Palace, in Perthshire. (Note: John Thomson's Atlas of Scotland, 1832: Perthshire with Clackmannan shows Rome as east of the River Tay, roughly opposite the mouth of the Almond - if so the site now lies within the park of Scone Palace) His mother was Agnes Duncan, a relative of Adam Duncan, 1st Viscount Duncan. In 1807, Matthew inherited Gourdiehill from Adam Duncan.

Matthew was educated at Perth Academy and the University of Edinburgh, but did not graduate due to the death of his father. Matthew had to take over the responsibilities of managing and running the affairs of a property estate at Gourdiehill. Over the years he successfully nurtured, cultivated, and transformed much of the estate's farmland and pastures into several large orchards of apple and pear trees, numbering over 10,000. During this time, Matthew became an avid researcher of both silviculture and horticulture. His research and experience at the modest estate framed a strong base of reference to form his own opinions and theories.

Matthew periodically traveled to Europe between 1807 and 1831 either on business or for his scientific studies. A trip to Paris in 1815 had to be cut short when Napoleon returned from Elba. Between 1840 and 1850, Matthew traveled extensively in what is now northern Germany. Recognizing the commercial potential of Hamburg, he bought two farms in Schleswig-Holstein.

Matthew married his maternal first cousin, Christian Nicol in 1817, and they had eight children: John (born 1818), Robert (1820), Alexander (1821), Charles (1824), Euphemia (1826), Agnes (1828), James Edward (1830), and Helen Amelia (1833). Robert farmed Gourdiehill in Patrick's old age, Alexander took over the German interests; the other three sons emigrated, initially to the United States. Matthew became interested in the colonization of New Zealand and was instrumental in setting up a "Scottish New Zealand Land Company". At his urging, James and Charles Matthew emigrated to New Zealand, where they set up one of the earliest commercial orchards in Australasia using seed and seedlings from Gourdiehill. John Matthew remained in America, sending botanical tree specimens back to his father; these included the first seedlings known to have been planted in Europe of both the Giant Redwood and the Coastal Redwood. A group of trees of these species still thriving near Inchture in Perthshire comes from these seedlings. Matthew gave many more seedlings to friends, relatives and neighbors, and redwoods can be found throughout the Carse of Gowrie; these as well as some elsewhere in Scotland (e.g. at Gillies Hill near Stirling Castle) are thought to have been grown from the seedlings. His reputation as a local celebrity faded in the twentieth century, when he was remembered as a "character" who at the end of his life became convinced that "someone very dear to his heart" had become a bird, and "that was the rizzen he wouldna allow the blackies to be shot in his orchard for fear they would shute her, ye ken, although the blackies were sair on the fruit".

Matthew's house, Gourdiehill, fell into disrepair in the 1970s and 1980s, and was demolished in 1990 when the grounds became a small housing estate; some of the salvaged stone was incorporated in a rock garden.

== Work ==
In managing his orchards, Patrick Matthew became familiar with the problems related to the principles of husbandry in horticulture for food production (and hence, by extension silviculture). In 1831, Matthew published On Naval Timber and Arboriculture to mixed reception. Notably, the book contains an addendum that discusses natural selection 28 years before Charles Darwin's publication of On the Origin of Species.

== Charles Darwin and natural selection ==
In 1860, Matthew read in the Gardeners' Chronicle for 3 March a review (by Huxley), republished from The Times, of Charles Darwin's On the Origin of Species, which said Darwin "professes to have discovered the existence and the modus operandi of natural selection, and described its principles". A letter by Matthew, published in the Gardeners' Chronicle on 7 April 1860, said that this was what he had "published very fully and brought to apply practically to forestry" in Naval Timber and Arboriculture in 1831, as publicised in reviews. He quoted extracts from his book, firstly the opening words of Note B from pages 364–365 of the Appendix, stopping before his discussion of hereditary nobility and entail.

He then quoted in its entirety a section from pages 381 to 388 of the Appendix. This lacked a heading, but in the Contents appeared as "Accommodation of organized life to circumstance, by diverging ramifications". In it, he commented on the difficulty of distinguishing "between species and variety". The change of the fossil record between geological eras implied living organisms having "a power of change, under a change of circumstances", in the same way as the "derangements and changes in organised existence, induced by a change of circumstance from the interference of man" gave "proof of the plastic quality of superior life" which he called "a circumstance-suiting power". Following past deluges, "an unoccupied field would be formed for new diverging ramifications of life" in "the course of time, moulding and accommodating their being anew to the change of circumstances". He proposed that "the progeny of the same parents, under great difference of circumstance, might, in several generations, even become distinct species, incapable of co-reproduction."

The self-regulating adaptive disposition of organised life, may, in part, be traced to the extreme fecundity of Nature, who, as before stated, has, in all the varieties of her offspring, a prolific power much beyond (in many cases a thousandfold) what is necessary to fill up the vacancies caused by senile decay. As the field of existence is limited and pre-occupied, it is only the hardier, more robust, better suited to circumstance individuals, who are able to struggle forward to maturity, these inhabiting only the situations to which they have superior adaptation and greater power of occupancy than any other kind; the weaker, less circumstance-suited, being prematurely destroyed.

He described this as a "circumstance-adaptive law, operating upon the slight but continued natural disposition to sport in the progeny". Matthew then quoted the opening three paragraphs from Part III of his book, Miscellaneous Matter Connected with Naval Timber: Nurseries, pages 106 to 108, on "the luxuriance and size of timber depending upon the particular variety of the species" and the need to select seed from the best individuals when growing trees.

On reading this, Darwin commented in a letter to Charles Lyell dated 10 April:

Now for a curious thing about my Book, & then I have done. In last Saturday Gardeners' Chronicle, a Mr Patrick Matthews [sic] publishes long extract from his work on Naval Timber & Arboriculture published in 1831, in which he briefly but completely anticipates the theory of Nat. Selection. I have ordered the Book, as some few passages are rather obscure but it, is certainly, I think, a complete but not developed anticipation! Erasmus always said that surely this would be shown to be the case someday. Anyhow one may be excused in not having discovered the fact in a work on Naval Timber.

Darwin then wrote a letter of his own to the Gardener's Chronicle, stating,

I have been much interested by Mr. Patrick Matthew's communication in the Number of your Paper, dated April 7th. I freely acknowledge that Mr. Matthew has anticipated by many years the explanation which I have offered of the origin of species, under the name of natural selection. I think that no one will feel surprised that neither I, nor apparently any other naturalist, had heard of Mr. Matthew's views, considering how briefly they are given, and that they appeared in the appendix to a work on Naval Timber and Arboriculture. I can do no more than offer my apologies to Mr. Matthew for my entire ignorance of his publication. If another edition of my work is called for, I will insert a notice to the foregoing effect.

As promised, Darwin included a statement in the third (1861) and subsequent editions of On the Origin of Species, acknowledging that Matthew had anticipated "precisely the same view on the origin of species" and "clearly saw...the full force of the principle of natural selection". The statement referred to the correspondence, and quoted from a response by Matthew published in the Gardener's Chronicle. Darwin wrote that.

Unfortunately the view was given by Mr. Matthew very briefly in scattered passages in an Appendix to a work on a different subject, so that it remained unnoticed until Mr. Matthew himself drew attention to it in the 'Gardener's Chronicle,' on April 7th, 1860. The differences of Mr. Matthew's view from mine are not of much importance: he seems to consider that the world was nearly depopulated at successive periods, and then re-stocked; and he gives, as an alternative, that new forms may be generated without the presence of any mould or germ of former aggregates. I am not sure that I understand some passages; but it seems that he attributes much influence to the direct action of the conditions of life. He clearly saw, however, the full force of the principle of natural selection. In answer to a letter of mine (published in Gard. Chron., April 13th), fully acknowledging that Mr. Matthew had anticipated me, he with generous candour wrote a letter (Gard. Chron. May 12th) containing the following passage:—"To me the conception of this law of Nature came intuitively as a self-evident fact, almost without an effort of concentrated thought. Mr. Darwin here seems to have more merit in the discovery than I have had; to me it did not appear a discovery. He seems to have worked it out by inductive reason, slowly and with due caution to have made his way synthetically from fact to fact onwards; while with me it was by a general glance at the scheme of Nature that I estimated this select production of species as an à priori recognisable fact—an axiom requiring only to be pointed out to be admitted by unprejudiced minds of sufficient grasp."

In June 1864, after visiting his son who was farming in Schleswig-Holstein, Matthew wrote to Darwin about his pamphlet publishing five of his letters. The title page of this political pamphlet by Matthew stated his claim to be "solver of the problem of species". In a letter to Hooker (22 and 28 October 1865), Darwin commented that William Charles Wells, in an essay "read in 1813 to Royal Soc. but not printed", had applied "most distinctly the principle of N. Selection to the races of man.— So poor old Patrick Matthew, is not the first, & he cannot or ought not any longer put on his Title pages 'Discoverer of the principle of Natural Selection'!."

== Matthew's legacy in evolutionary studies ==
Matthew, Darwin and Wallace are the only three people considered to have independently discovered the principle of natural selection as a mechanism for speciation (macroevolution). Others prior to Matthew had proposed natural selection as a mechanism for the generation of varieties or races within a species: James Hutton suggested the mechanism in 1794 as leading to improvement of varieties, and an 1813 paper by William Charles Wells proposed that it would form new varieties.

=== Modern claims for Matthew's priority ===
Although Darwin insisted he had been unaware of Matthew's work, some modern commentators have held that he and Wallace were likely to have known of it, or could have been influenced indirectly by other naturalists who read and cited Matthew's book.

- Ronald W. Clark, in his 1984 biography of Darwin, commented that Only the transparent honesty of Darwin's character... makes it possible to believe that by the 1850s he had no recollection of Matthew's work. This begs the question, for it assumes he did read Matthew's book. Clark continues by suggesting: If Darwin had any previous knowledge of Arboriculture, it had slipped down into the unconscious.
- In 2014, Nottingham Trent University criminologist Mike Sutton published in a non-peer-reviewed (i.e., not reviewed by experts in the field) proceedings a research paper that he presented to a British Society of Criminology conference proposing that both Darwin and Wallace had "more likely than not committed the world's greatest science fraud by apparently plagiarising the entire theory of natural selection from a book written by Patrick Matthew and then claiming to have no prior knowledge of it." On 28 May 2014 The Daily Telegraph science correspondent reported Sutton's views, and also the opinion of Darwin biographer James Moore that this was a non-issue (below). Sutton published a 2014 non-peer reviewed e-book Nullius in Verba: Darwin's Greatest Secret reiterating his argument, and alleging that "the orthodox Darwinist account" is wrong as "Darwin/Wallace corresponded with, were editorially assisted by, admitted to being influenced by and met with other naturalists who - it is newly discovered - had read and cited Matthew's book long before 1858". Sutton included as one of these naturalists the publisher Robert Chambers, and said it was significant that the book by Matthew had been cited in the weekly magazine Chambers's Edinburgh Journal on 24 March 1832, then in 1844 Chambers had published anonymously the best selling Vestiges of the Natural History of Creation which, according to Sutton, had influenced Darwin and Wallace. In 2015, Sutton further repeated his assertion of "knowledge contamination" in the Polish journal, Filozoficzne Aspekty Genezy (F.A.G.) (Philosophical Aspects of Genesis), which Sutton asserts is peer-reviewed, and about which, one of the journal's editors responded, "As to Sutton, he cannot justifiably claim much credibility for his ideas just because these are published in such a journal like ours, i.e. one adopting Feyerabendian pluralism. If he thinks otherwise, it is only his problem. Any reasonable person should know better." In addition to his papers and e-book, Sutton disseminates his claims against Charles Darwin and Alfred Russel Wallace via several blog sites and Twitter accounts, and public lectures: to the Ethical Society, at the Conway Hall, on 27 July 2014; to the Teesside Skeptics in the Pub, at O'Connells Pub in Middlehaven, a ward of Middlesbrough, on 2 October 2014; and to the Carse of Gowrie Sustainability Group, at the James Hutton Institute, at Craigiebuckler, Aberdeen, on 17 March 2016.

However, there is no direct evidence that Darwin had read the book, and his letter to Charles Lyell stating that he had ordered the book clearly indicates that he did not have a copy in his extensive library or access to it elsewhere. The particular claim that Robert Chambers had read and transmitted Matthew's ideas that are relevant to natural selection is also not supported by the facts. The article in the Chambers's Edinburgh Journal (1832, vol. 1, no. 8, 24 March, p. 63) is not a review but only an abridged excerpt from pp. 8–14 of On Naval Timber that amounts to no more than a recipe for pruning and contains nothing of relevance to natural selection. It is headed "ON THE TRAINING OF PLANK TIMBER" and ends with ".— Matthew on Naval Timber." Even if it had been penned by Robert Chambers, this does not mean that he had read or understood, leave alone transmitted, the other passages of Matthew's book that do contain anything relevant to natural selection. Further, The Vestiges of the Natural History of Creation contain nothing of relevance about natural selection. Combining these facts, Robert Chambers had probably not read or received the message about natural selection in Matthew's book, likely did not promulgate it in the Vestiges, and probably neither in conversations.

=== Rebuttal of claims ===
Challenges to Matthew's claim to priority, or those made since he died, have essentially made reference to the same issues, that his description of natural selection was not accessible and it lacked lengthier development. Other criticisms have focussed on the differences between Darwin's and Matthew's versions of natural selection, and sometimes Wallace's too (e.g., Weale 2015). If Matthew's ideas had made the impact on subsequent evolutionary thinking, as claimed, the signals ought to be there, either during Matthew's lifetime, or Darwin's. Yet, modern claims for Matthew's priority have been unable to provide evidence for this, that has withstood fact checking.

==== Accessibility and development ====
Historian of science, Peter Bowler succinctly summarised some of those main reasons given for why Matthew does not deserve priority for natural selection over Darwin and Wallace,

Such efforts to denigrate Darwin misunderstand the whole point of the history of science: Matthew did suggest a basic idea of selection, but he did nothing to develop it; and he published it in the appendix to a book on the raising of trees for shipbuilding. No one took him seriously, and he played no role in the emergence of Darwinism. Simple priority is not enough to earn a thinker a place in the history of science: one has to develop the idea and convince others of its value to make a real contribution. Darwin's notebooks confirm that he drew no inspiration from Matthew or any of the other alleged precursors.

Ernst Mayr's opinion was even more clear-cut:

Patrick Matthew undoubtedly had the right idea, just like Darwin did on September 28, 1838, but he did not devote the next twenty years to converting it into a cogent theory of evolution. As a result it had no impact whatsoever.

Richard Dawkins also grants that Matthew had grasped the general concept of natural selection, but failed to appreciate the significance, nor develop it further,

I agree with W.J. Dempster, Patrick Matthew's modern champion, that Matthew has been unkindly treated by history. 'But, unlike Dempster, I hesitate to assign full priority to him. Partly, it is because he wrote in a much more obscure style than either Darwin or Wallace, which makes it hard to know in some places what he was trying to say (Darwin himself noted this). But mostly it is because he seems to have underestimated the idea, to an extent where we have to doubt whether he really understood how important it was. The same could be said, even more strongly (which is why I have not treated his case in the same detail as Matthew's), of W.C. Wells, whom Darwin also scrupulously acknowledged (in the fourth and subsequent editions of The Origin). Wells made the leap to generalise from artificial to natural selection, but he applied it only to humans, and he thought of it as choosing among races of people rather than individuals as Darwin and Wallace did. Wells therefore seems to have arrived at a form of 'group selection' rather than true, Darwinian natural selection as Matthew did, which selects individual organisms for their reproductive success. Darwin also lists other partial predecessors, who had shadowy inklings of natural selection. Like Patrick Matthew, none of them seems to have grasped the earth-shattering significance of the idea they had lit upon, and I shall use Matthew's name to represent them all. I am increasingly inclined to agree with Matthew that natural selection itself scarcely needed discovering. What needed discovering was the significance of natural selection for the evolution of all life.

In response to Sutton's e-book, Darwin biographer James Moore said many people came towards a similar perception during the 19th century, but Darwin was the only one who fully developed the idea:

Patrick Matthew has always struck me as a non-issue. Many people understood the issue of natural selection but it was only Darwin who applied it to everything on the planet, as an entire vision of life. That was his legacy. I would be extremely surprised if there was any new evidence had not been already seen and interpreted in the opposite way.

In response to Sutton (2015) Darwin and Wallace scholar, John van Wyhe commented,

This conspiracy theory is so silly and based on such forced and contorted imitations of historical method that no qualified historian could take it seriously.

To coincide with Sutton's presentation to the Carse of Gowrie Sustainability Group, Darwin author, Julian F. Derry sent an open letter, saying,

contrary to what Dr Sutton has told you tonight, Patrick Matthew did not influence the course of evolutionary history in the way that is claimed [. ...] Dr Sutton is not the myth-buster that he calls himself [and,] has been either, wrong, inaccurate or irrelevant in his conclusions [. ...] Darwin and Wallace were the first to propose adaptive changes via incremental gradualism producing species better suited to their environment, making natural selection sufficiently novel in this sense [. ...] The title of Darwin's book could have been inspired by several sources[, ...] Chambers likely never saw Matthew's book[, ... and, t]his is how the history will remain, despite Dr Sutton's efforts to have it modified

==== Analysis of comparative speciation concepts ====
Sutton's claim that Darwin and Wallace plagiarised evolution by natural selection from Matthew also has been refuted by Joachim Dagg,

[Wallace's] concept of lineage-adaptation as a sequence of extinctions of less fit and survival of fitter varieties and his gradualism put him closer to Darwin than to Matthew. But he emphasized environmental changes for differential extinction and some form of isolation for lineage-splitting and speciation, whereas Darwin's mature theory saw competition as a sufficient cause of divergence, differential extinction, lineage-adaptation and lineage-splitting. This is not to say that Darwin was right in this view and Wallace wrong. By current standards, they were both right and wrong in different respects (competitive vs. environmental selection, sympatric vs. allopatric speciation).

The perspective emerging from this comparison shows at least four unique theories (Matthew, early Darwin, mature Darwin and Wallace), each interesting in its own right. Each theory integrated change in conditions, variability, competition and natural selection in ways that allowed for species transformation somehow. Apart from this similarity, the theories differ significantly from each other in the mechanisms underlying transformation. However, this difference does not lie in the struggle for survival and survival of the fittest, but in the way in which natural selection is integrated with variability, competition and environmental conditions. Transmutation is a convergent result of structurally different mechanisms.

The similarity of Matthew's scheme to the theory of punctuated equilibria is equally superficial. Eldredge & Gould (1972) took Mayr's model of allopatric speciation and combined it with Wright's model of genetic drift in order to explain gaps in the fossil record as results of relatively swift evolutionary change in small and isolated populations. Although catastrophes can produce such populations they are not required, and the mechanism underlying the punctuated record is the drift within small and isolated populations, not the absence of competing species that would prevent species transmutation. Therefore, viewing Matthew (1831) as an anticipator of the theory of punctuated equilibria (e.g. Rampino, 2011) is as wrong as claiming his scheme identical to Darwin's or Wallace's.

==== Darwin's contemporaries ====
While completing a doctoral thesis on Disputes of Plagiarism in Darwin's Theory of Evolution at the University of Zielona Gora, where the journal Filozoficzne Aspekty Genezy (F.A.G.) (Philosophical Aspects of Genesis) is based, Grzegorz Malec published a critical review of Sutton (2015), in which the main difficulty of valid identification of communication pathways was discussed, along with observations on Sutton's alternative approach,

If Sutton is right and Darwin was a plagiarist, it will be the most shocking discovery in the history of science. But he must present hard evidence to convince anyone that Darwin read Matthew's book before 1859 and had known those fragments concerning natural selection. Eventually, he should prove that Darwin learned about Matthew's idea from one of his friends or correspondences [...] Sutton's line of reasoning can be reduced to one simple pattern: since Wilkin could read Matthew, then he must have done so, and because he could have discussed his evolutionary views with Joseph Hooker (1817-1911), then he did, and since Hooker could have informed Darwin about Matthew's book, then he did. But all of this is inferred by Sutton without offering any hard evidence that this really happened. Similar situation concerns Mudie, Main, Conrad, Roget, Johnson, Selby, Emmons, Laycock, Powell and Leidy [...] It seems that Darwin's acknowledgement to Matthew in his letter to The Gardeners' Chronicle, and putting the latter's name in the list of predecessors in the historical sketch in On the Origin of Species, was fair enough.

== Natural theology ==
Writing to Darwin in 1871, Matthew enclosed an article he had written for The Scotsman and, as well as wishing that he had time to write a critique of The Descent of Man, and Selection in Relation to Sex, expressed the belief that there is evidence of design and benevolence in nature, and that beauty cannot be accounted for by natural selection. Such a belief is mainstream natural theology, and reveals how far Matthew was from Darwin in realising the potential of evolutionary explanations: for him as well as others, man was the sticking-point.

There is little or no evidence that Matthew held these views as a younger man: there is no discussion of a religious nature in Arboriculture.

== Socio-political views ==
Matthew's idea on society were radical for their times. Although he was a landowner, he was involved with the Chartist movement, and argued that institutions of hereditary nobility were detrimental to society. It has been suggested that these views worked against acceptance of his theory of natural selection, being politically incorrect at the time (see Barker, 2001). The more likely reason is that the obscurity of the location hid the ideas from many who would have been interested. Only after Darwin's Origin did Matthew come forward in a popular journal, the Gardeners' Chronicle. Matthew also published a book in 1839, Emigration Fields (Black, Edinburgh), suggesting that overpopulation, as predicted by Malthus, could be solved by mass migration to North America and the Dominions.

Matthew supported the invasion of Schleswig-Holstein by Bismarck in 1864: his pamphlet on the event was denounced by the Dundee Advertiser. He also supported the Germans against the French in the Franco-Prussian War (1870–71), a war which marked the final unification of the German Empire and the end of the Second French Empire.

In 1870 Matthew became aware of the terrible housing conditions of the workers in Dundee. In a letter to the Dundee Advertiser he told readers that the death rate of children under five in the town was 40%, and outlined a blueprint for the redevelopment of the city.

== The Tay bridge ==
When the Edinburgh and Northern Railway (E&N) and the Dundee and Perth Railway (D&P) were seeking Parliamentary approval in 1845, it was proposed by their engineers that from Perth both should share a line running along the south bank of the Tay as far as Newburgh, where the D&P would cross to the north bank, and the E&N leave the Tay and head south to a ferry crossing of the Forth. Matthew had been in a very small minority supporting this, and the D&P as built crossed the Tay at Perth. In 1864, when a bridge crossing the Tay at Dundee was proposed, Matthew urged that a bridge at Newburgh was preferable to a bridge at Dundee, a Newburgh bridge giving much the same reduction in the rail distance between Dundee and the Forth ferry-ports from which passengers could cross to Edinburgh as a bridge at Dundee but doing so by a shorter (and therefore cheaper) crossing of the Tay. He argued the costs of a Dundee bridge were being grossly under-estimated: "To erect a substantial bridge, not a flimsy spectral thing, which might or not vanish as a phantom the first storm, or break down under the vibration caused by a heavy, rapid, moving train, would, in my opinion cost nearly double, and probably much more than double, the sum the Engineer states; upon this I stake my judgement against that of the Engineer", noting in passing, "from the geological indices, I would expect the foundation to be more regular at Newburgh than at Dundee, consequently better".

The financial crisis of 1866 put an end to the 1864 Tay Bridge proposal, but it was revived in 1869. Matthew responded with a series of letters to the Dundee papers arguing for a Newburgh bridge, and advancing all manner of additional arguments against a Dundee bridge; it would have a deleterious effect on silting and tidal scour in the Firth; it would prevent navigation upstream of it; it would be torn apart by the centrifugal force from heavy trains rapidly descending the curve at its northern end; it was vulnerable to earthquake, a ship colliding with a pier, or to high wind.

Matthew's objections were not heeded, and were not persisted in once Parliament had passed the Bill authorising construction of the Tay Bridge. During construction of the bridge some of Matthew's criticisms were borne out: it became apparent that bedrock could not be found at a depth allowing the use of brick piers; the design had to be modified to use lattice-work iron piers of reduced width, and there was considerable cost overrun. The bridge opened in June 1878 and was destroyed in a storm in December 1879: the lattice work piers supporting the centre section of the bridge (the high girders) failed catastrophically as a train was crossing the bridge. The high girders and the train fell into the Tay and about seventy-five lives were lost. Whilst it was recalled in the immediate aftermath of the disaster that Matthew had predicted collapse in a high wind as one of the horrible ends to which a bridge at Dundee could come, the disaster is generally ascribed to defects in the design and manufacture of the lattice work piers introduced into the design well after Matthew's campaign against the bridge.

== See also ==
- Evolution
- History of evolutionary thought
- Natural selection
- Tay Bridge disaster
- William Charles Wells

== Notes ==
Notes

Citations
