= Inchture Tramway =

Horse-drawn tramway in Scotland

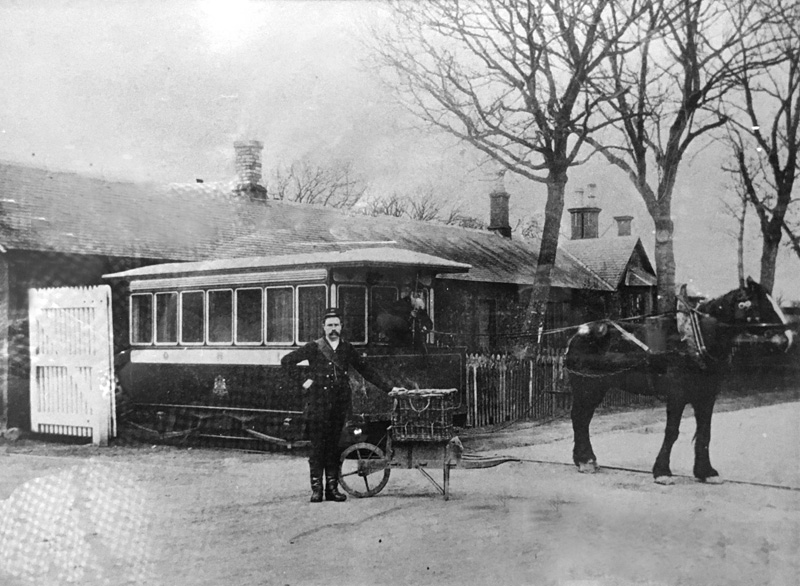
- The Inchture Tram outside the Crossgates depot in 1905 with Bob Speed driving it

Operation
- Locale: Inchture
- Open: 1848
- Close: 1 January 1917
- Status: Closed

Infrastructure
- Track gauge: 1,435 mm (4 ft 8 1/2 in)
- Propulsion system: Horse

Statistics
- Route length: 1.475 miles (2.374 km)

Inchture Tramways operated a horse-drawn tramway service in Inchture between 1848 and 1917.

== History ==
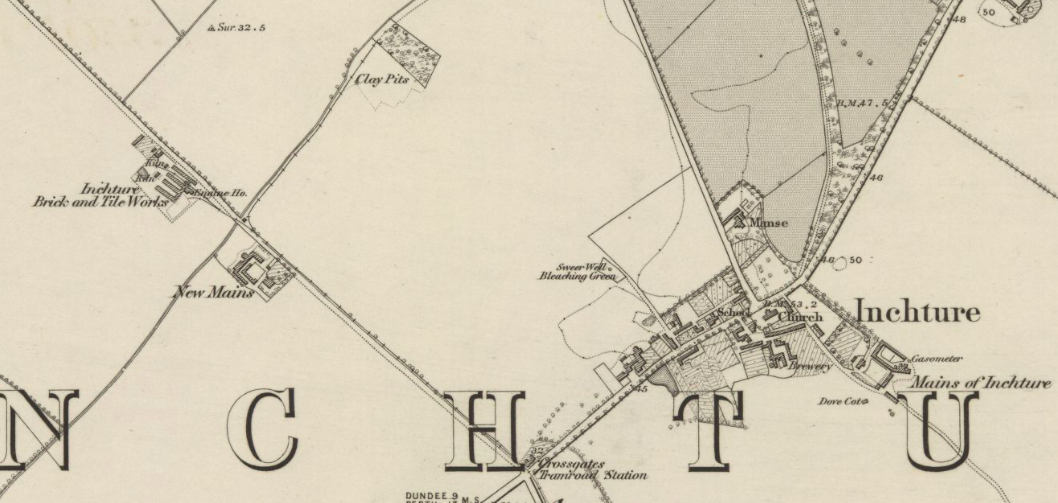
Inchture Tramway northern section between Crossgates and the Inchture Brick and Tile Works

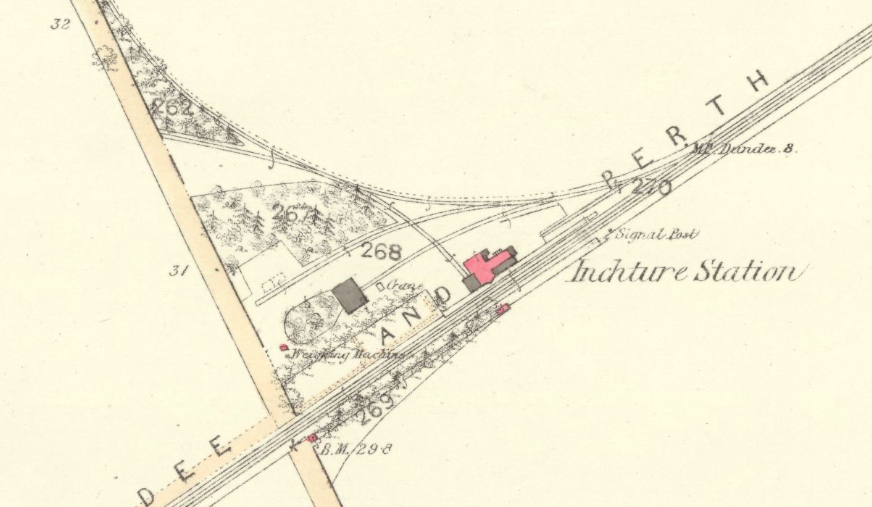
The terminus at Inchture Village railway station ca. 1863

The tramline was built by the Caledonian Railway and opened in 1848 to connect Inchture to Inchture Village railway station. It was recorded as being 1 mile 31 chains (2.2 km) long.

Shortly after opening it was extended to connect the Inchture Brick and Tile Works belonging to George Kinnaird, 9th Lord Kinnaird on the Farm of New Mains with Inchture railway station. A short branch at New Main farm also ran to the clay pits to the north east of the New Mains farm house. The line was around 3 kilometres (1.9 mi) long.

A passenger service was provided by a single horse and tramway car, which had a depot at Crossgates, Inchture. This location served as the stables and also formed the terminus of the passenger service from Inchture Village railway station on the Dundee and Perth Railway line. The tramway depot is now Category B listed.

== Closure ==
The service was closed on 1 January 1917 and the tracks were taken to France to assist in the war effort.
