= Longforgan railway station =

Disused railway station in Longforgan, Perth and Kinross

Longforgan

General information
- Location: Longforgan, Perth and Kinross; Scotland
- Coordinates: 56.4446°N 3.1051°W
- Grid reference: NO319285
- Platforms: 2

Other information
- Status: Disused

History
- Original company: Dundee and Perth Railway
- Pre-grouping: Caledonian Railway
- Post-grouping: London, Midland and Scottish Railway

Key dates
- 24 May 1847: Opened
- 11 June 1956: Closed

Listed Building – Category C(S)
- Designated: 25 February 1993
- Reference no.: LB13269
Location

Longforgan railway station served the village of Longforgan, Perth and Kinross, Scotland from 1847 to 1956 on the Dundee and Perth Railway.

== History ==
The station opened on 24 May 1847 by the Dundee and Perth Railway. The goods yard was to the north. The station closed to both passengers and goods traffic on 11 June 1956. The signal box and the station building remain and have been a listed building since 1993.

Preceding station	Historical railways	Following station
Invergowrie; Line and station open	Dundee and Perth Railway	Inchture; Line open, station closed
