= Perth Princes Street railway station =

Disused railway station in Perth, Perth and Kinross

Perth Princes Street
- The waiting room, pictured in the 1960s, looking southwest

General information
- Location: Princes Street; Perth, Perth and Kinross; Scotland
- Coordinates: 56.3924°N 3.4279°W
- Grid reference: NO119231
- Platforms: 2

Other information
- Status: Disused

History
- Original company: Dundee and Perth Railway
- Pre-grouping: Scottish Central Railway; Caledonian Railway
- Post-grouping: London, Midland and Scottish Railway; British Rail (Scottish Region)

Key dates
- 24 May 1847: Opened
- 1 January 1917: Closed as a wartime economy measure
- 1 June 1919: Reopened
- 28 February 1966: Closed
Location

Perth Princes Street railway station served the city of Perth, Perth and Kinross, Scotland, from 1847 to 1966 on the Dundee and Perth Railway.

== History ==
The station's platform around 1968. In view to the west are St Leonard's-in-the-Fields Church (left) and the now-demolished Dewar's whisky facility (centre).

The station, which was located on Princes Street near the eastern end of South William Street, opened on 24 May 1847 by the Dundee and Perth Railway. To the south was the goods yard and to the east was the signal box. To the west was an engine shed, although it was removed early in the station's lifespan. The station temporarily closed as a wartime economy measure on 1 January 1917 and reopened on 1 June 1919. The signal box closed around 1921. The station closed permanently on 28 February 1966.

The Moncreiffe Arms Hotel stood adjacent to the station. A 1907 advertisement listed the proprietor as A. L. Kennedy.

Preceding station	Historical railways	Following station
Barnhill; Line open, station closed	Dundee and Perth Railway	Perth; Line and station open
