= Dundee West =

Dundee West may mean or refer to:

- Dundee West (UK Parliament constituency)
- Dundee West (Scottish Parliament constituency)
- Dundee West railway station

== See also ==
- West Dundee, Illinois
