= Abernyte =

Coordinates: 56.467068°N 3.205881°W

- Location within Perth and Kinross
- Population: 116
- OS grid reference: NO258312
- Council area: Perth and Kinross
- Lieutenancy area: Perth and Kinross
- Country: Scotland
- Sovereign state: United Kingdom
- Post town: PERTH
- Postcode district: PH14
- Dialling code: 01828
- Police: Scotland
- Fire: Scottish
- Ambulance: Scottish
- Scottish Parliament: Perthshire North; Mid Scotland and Fife

Abernyte is a small village in Perth and Kinross in Scotland.

== Geography ==
The village lies roughly 2 miles (3 kilometres) northwest of the former Inchture railway station, and around 7 miles (11 kilometres) west of Dundee.

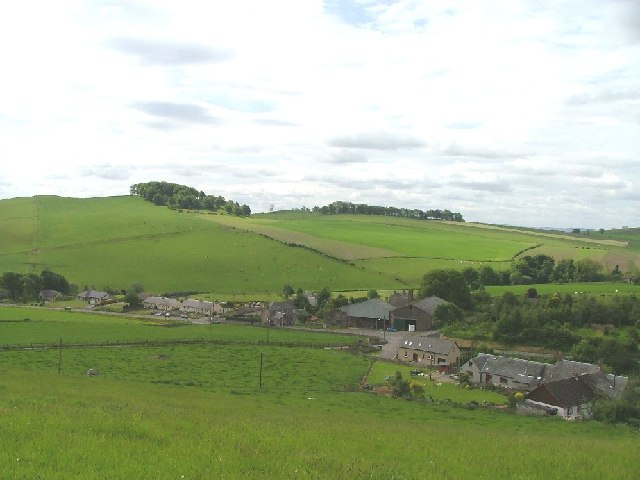
Abernyte

== Buildings ==
The village has a heritage organisation, the Abernyte Heritage Group, which was formed in 1988. The group was formed by a mixture of longstanding residents and more recent arrivals to Abernyte and was part of a drive to maintain and celebrate the village's distinct local identity. The group undertook an oral history project in 1996, which is now held at the archives at the University of Dundee.

The history of Abernyte in the nineteenth and early twentieth centuries is documented in Abernyte: The Quiet Revolution, which was written by Dr Mary Young and the Abernyte Heritage Group and published in 2008.

The Scottish Antique and Arts Centre lies around 1/4 mile (400 metres) south of the village, which was converted from the founding site of Stout Brothers Motors, a pioneering vehicle sales and service enterprise, which was founded in 1947. In 1950, Stuart and Marcus Stout acquired the United Free Church next to the South Manse property, which was their family home at that time, having been purchased by Dundee fish merchant and Motor Racing Driver Thomas Stout in 1934. The business started as a small workshop carrying out repairs to tractors and various types of machinery, before progressing to vehicle sales as well as aftersales, which drew customers from all over Scotland. Throughout the 1950s and 1960s, the business had expanded, being handed the Rootes Group franchise in 1960 and the brothers purchased ground from Mr. Sands at the neighbouring Milton Farm, allowing extension from the church which became the workshop and the extension allowed a showroom and cleaning bay to operate. The business closed on August 28, 1996.

Between the 1961 and 1991, the village was the location of a Royal Observer Corps underground monitoring post, part of 28 Group. The post has now been fully restored and is regularly maintained and preserved as a tribute to the last Group Commandant of 28 Group, local man J.R.D. (Hamish) Carr.

The Abernyte Brewery, a microbrewery, is located at South Latch Farm near the village.

== Education ==
The village has a small primary school. The proposed closing of the school in 2020 was defeated by the community and the school numbers have increased from 6 to 34 in 2024, along with an extremely positive inspection report.

The parish church is part of the Abernyte linked with Inchture and Kinnaird linked with Longforgan grouping of churches.

== Monuments ==
There is a prehistoric grave known as the Long Man's grave near Abernyte, folklore traditions said that this was the grave of Macbeth. It was considered to possibly be a fallen standing stone but is more usually thought of as a stone capped grave.

== Census ==
In 2001, the population was 106 and had risen to 116 in 2011.
