= Glencarse railway station =

Disused railway station in Glencarse, Perth and Kinross

Glencarse

General information
- Location: Glencarse, Perth and Kinross; Scotland
- Coordinates: 56.3789°N 3.302°W
- Grid reference: NO196215
- Platforms: 2

Other information
- Status: Disused

History
- Original company: Dundee and Perth Railway
- Pre-grouping: Caledonian Railway
- Post-grouping: London, Midland and Scottish Railway

Key dates
- 24 May 1847: Opened
- 11 June 1956: Closed
Location

Glencarse railway station served the village of Glencarse, Perth and Kinross, Scotland from 1847 to 1956 on the Dundee and Perth Railway.

== History ==
The station opened on 24 May 1847 by the Dundee and Perth Railway. The goods yard was to the east and to the south was Pitfour Brick and Tile Works. The station closed to both passengers and goods traffic on 11 June 1956. The station house still stands.

Preceding station	Historical railways	Following station
Errol; Line open, station closed	Dundee and Perth Railway	Kinfauns; Line open, station closed
