= Kinfauns railway station =

Disused railway station in Kinfauns, Perth and Kinross

Coordinates: 56.3822°N 3.3653°W

Kinfauns

General information
- Location: Kinfauns, Perthshire; Scotland
- Platforms: 2

Other information
- Status: Disused

History
- Original company: Dundee and Perth Railway
- Pre-grouping: Caledonian Railway
- Post-grouping: London, Midland and Scottish Railway

Key dates
- 24 May 1847: Opened
- 2 January 1950: Closed
Location

Kinfauns railway station served the village of Kinfauns, Perthshire, Scotland, from 1847 to 1950 on the Dundee and Perth Railway.

== History ==
The station opened on 24 May 1847 by the Dundee and Perth Railway. The goods yard was to the northeast. The station closed to both passengers and goods traffic on 2 January 1950.

| Preceding station | Historical railways | Following station |
|---|---|---|
| Glencarse; Line open, station closed | Dundee and Perth Railway | Barnhill; Line open, station closed |
