= Inchyra =

Coordinates: 56.367926°N 3.324166°W

Inchyra: Scottish Gaelic: An Innis Iarach
- Location within Perth and Kinross
- Population: 21
- OS grid reference: NO183203
  - Edinburgh: 47 mi (76 km)
  - London: 364 mi (586 km)
- Council area: Perth and Kinross
- Lieutenancy area: Perth and Kinross
- Country: Scotland
- Sovereign state: United Kingdom
- Post town: PERTH
- Postcode district: PH2
- Dialling code: 01738
- Police: Scotland
- Fire: Scottish
- Ambulance: Scottish
- UK Parliament: Perth and North Perthshire
- Scottish Parliament: North Tayside; North East Scotland

Inchyra (/ɪnˈtʃaɪrə/; Scottish Gaelic: An Innis Iarach "the west isle") is a hamlet in the Carse of Gowrie in Scotland. It lies on the northern bank of the River Tay near Perth and is notable particularly for a number of archaeological finds made in the immediate vicinity.

== Geography ==
Inchyra lies on the northern bank of the River Tay to the south of the A90. It is approximately 5 kilometres (3.1 mi) east of Perth and 20 kilometres (12 mi) west-south-west of Dundee. It is situated close to St Madoes. It is the only L-shaped village in Scotland. It is surrounded by farmland.

== Toponymy ==
In common with a number of villages in the Carse of Gowrie, Inchyra has the Celtic placename element innis meaning "island". Carses such as the Carse of Gowrie are estuarine landforms that have been uplifted by isostatic rebound following the last glacial period. It is likely that Inchyra was an island in the firth of Tay at the time of its settlement.

== Inchyra Stone ==
In 1945 a class I Pictish stone was unearthed during ploughing in a field at Inchyra. The stone is inscribed with a variety of Pictish symbols, including a double disc, mirror and comb, two fish and a serpent as well as an Ogham inscription. It is now on display at Perth Museum.

== Roman archaeology ==
In June 1993, a small hoard of eight Roman Denarii coins were discovered at Inchyra, subsequently being declared as treasure trove and placed in Perth Museum. A Roman brooch with blue enamel inlay has also been found in river silt at Inchyra, again now displayed at Perth Museum.

== See also ==
- Carse of Gowrie
- Frederick Millar, 1st Baron Inchyra
- Perth, Scotland
- St Madoes

== Gallery ==
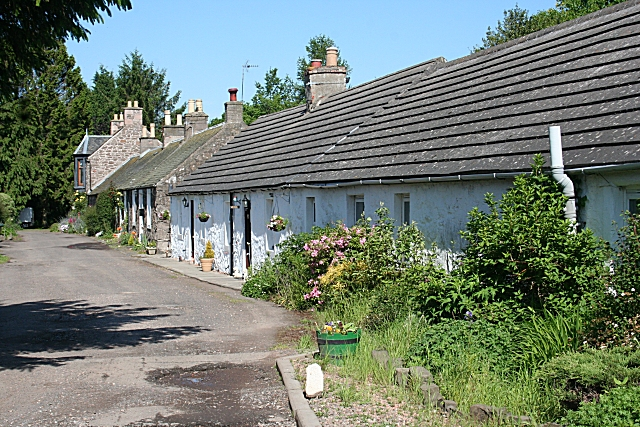
A row of traditional cottages

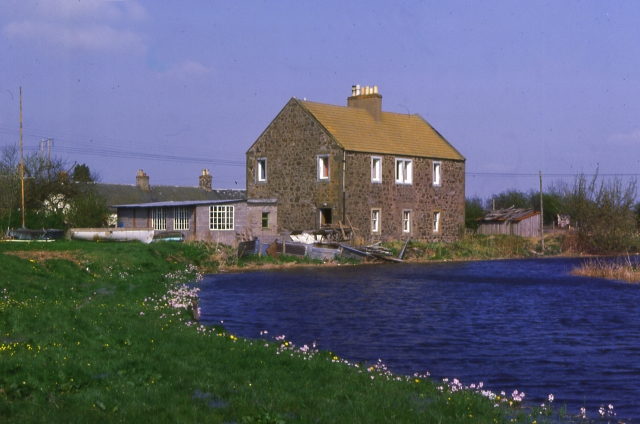
A house by a backwater of the Tay estuary

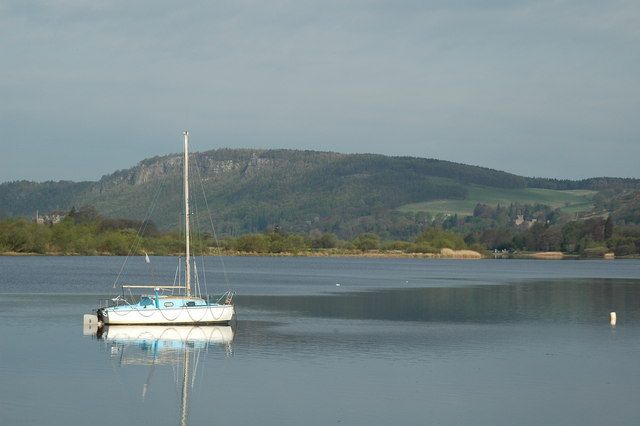
High Tide at Inchyra
