= Longforgan =

Town in Perth and Kinross, Scotland

Coordinates: 56.4572°N 3.1233°W

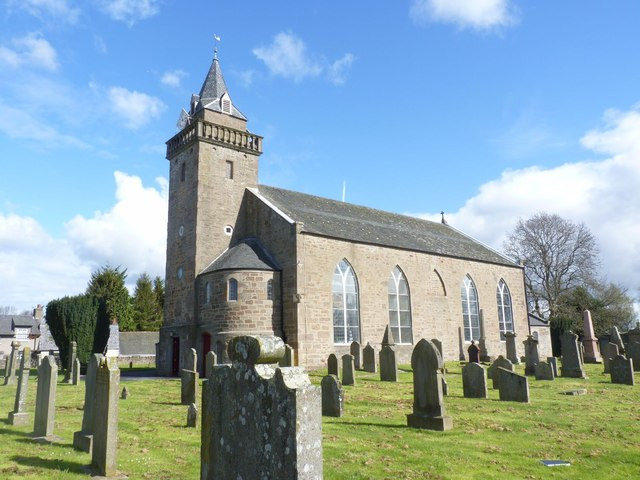

- Location within Perth and Kinross
- Population: 1,090 (2020)
- Council area: Perth and Kinross
- Country: Scotland
- Sovereign state: United Kingdom
- Post town: DUNDEE
- Postcode district: DD2
- Police: Scotland
- Fire: Scottish
- Ambulance: Scottish
- UK Parliament: Perth and Kinross-shire
- Scottish Parliament: Perthshire North

Longforgan is a town and parish in the Carse of Gowrie, in Perth and Kinross, Scotland. It lies 5 miles (8 kilometres) west of Dundee on the main A90 road.

== History ==
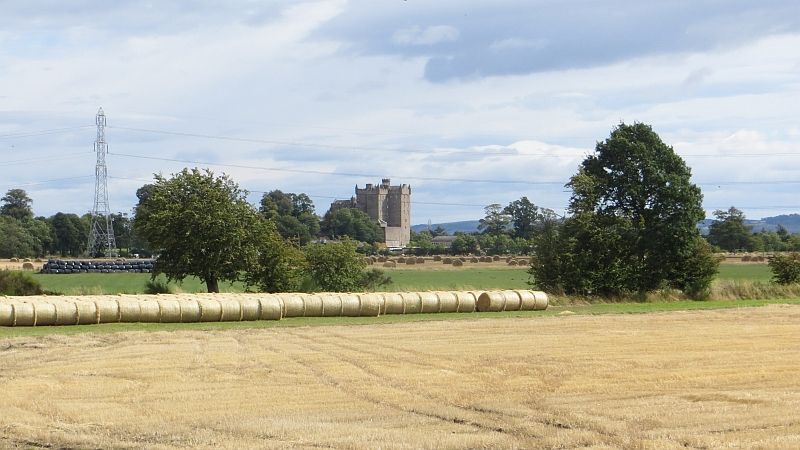
Castle Huntly

A record survives of Sir Patrick Gray, as Baron of Longforgan, holding a baronial court here in 1385 on the Longforgan or Hund Hill; a moot hill. The officials present were the same as those of the sovereign's courts. The village was created a burgh of barony in 1672. Castle Huntly, established in the 14th century and developed in the 17th and 18th centuries, is located 1/2 mile (800 metres) south-west of the village. It is now an open prison. A woodland, Huntly Woods, is situated 3/4 mi (1.2 km) away from the village. There is evidence that a Roman Camp was built in Huntly woods.

St Modwenna, who died in 521, is said to have founded a church at Longforgan. The present church, which probably stands on its site, was practically rebuilt in 1794, but during renovation about 1900, 15th century mouldings were discovered. A probably 13th century cross and a tombstone dated 1400, from the churchyard are preserved in the church.

The present church is still in use and no trace of an earlier building can be seen. A restored panel in the tower reads "Founded in 1690". Two stones bearing incised crosses stand against the wall of the vestibule within the church. The tombstone dated 1400 is fixed to the interior of the north wall of the church. Beneath it is a stone with the following inscription: "Found under floor at supposed east end of pre-Reformation church while altering present church 1899". This stone bears the full length effigies of a knight in armour, his lady in the costume of the period and a small figure of a youth in armour, either a son or an attendant squire. Around the edge of the stone a ribbon is carried which the following (Latin) inscription is incised in Gothic letters. A translation reads : here lies John de Galychtly, late Laird of Ebrokis. The date for death was not carved and the incised writing is relatively clear indicating the stone may not have been used as a grave marker. The lands of Ebrokis (Ebrukis, Ebrux) appear in the Great Seal Register 1508/9 within the barony of Longforgan. In a letter dated 1650 between Sir Patrick Ogilvie of Inchmartine and Thomas Ogilvie, the lands of Ebrokis are mentioned as 'Ebrux alias Broomhall'. Broomhall is located at the south west corner of Longforgan parish.

Two grave slabs, one to James Fife, d.1588 and the other to Jean Fledger, d.1660, have been removed from the graveyard, conserved and are now displayed within the church lobby. A tombstone to the 17th century painter Apollonia Kickius is in the graveyard.

William Wallace is said to have stopped here to rest after escaping from Dundee where he had killed the English governor's son. The knocking stone upon which he sat is preserved in the Dundee Museum.

== Name ==
The name Longforgan may be derived from Scottish Gaelic lann, meaning "enclosure" or "church", or lòn, meaning "marsh", coupled with fothir grund, meaning a fertile field. Its form in modern Scottish Gaelic is Forgrann.

== Description ==
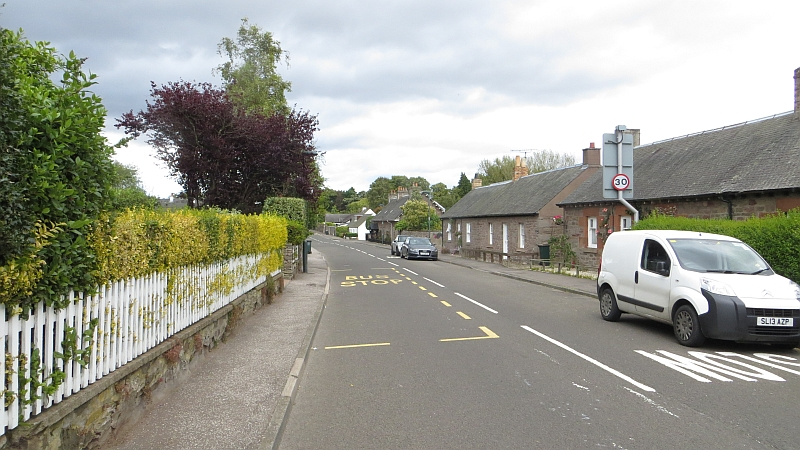
Main Street facing east

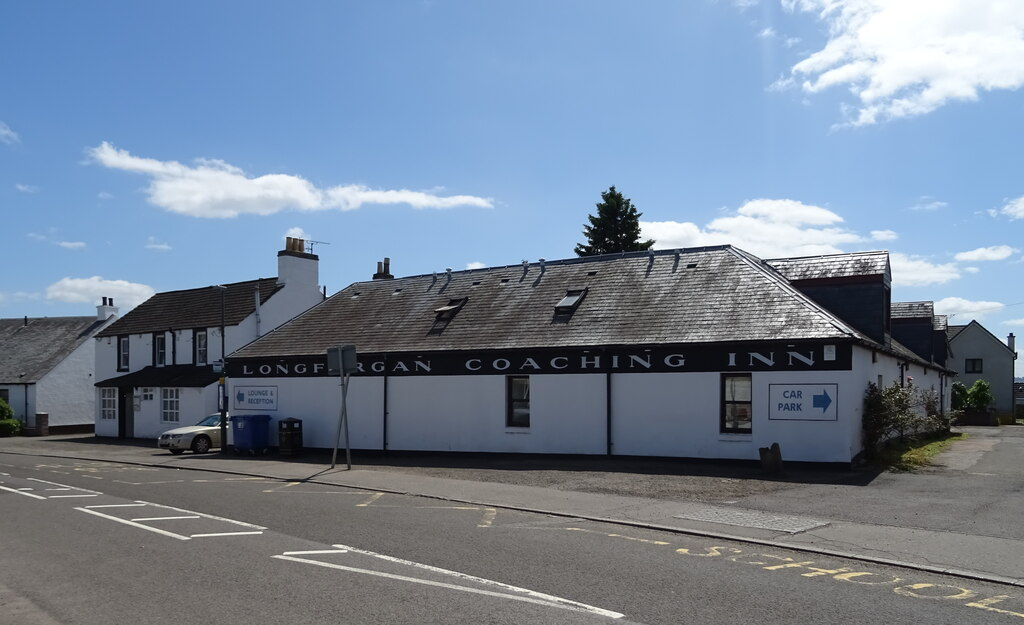
The coaching inn

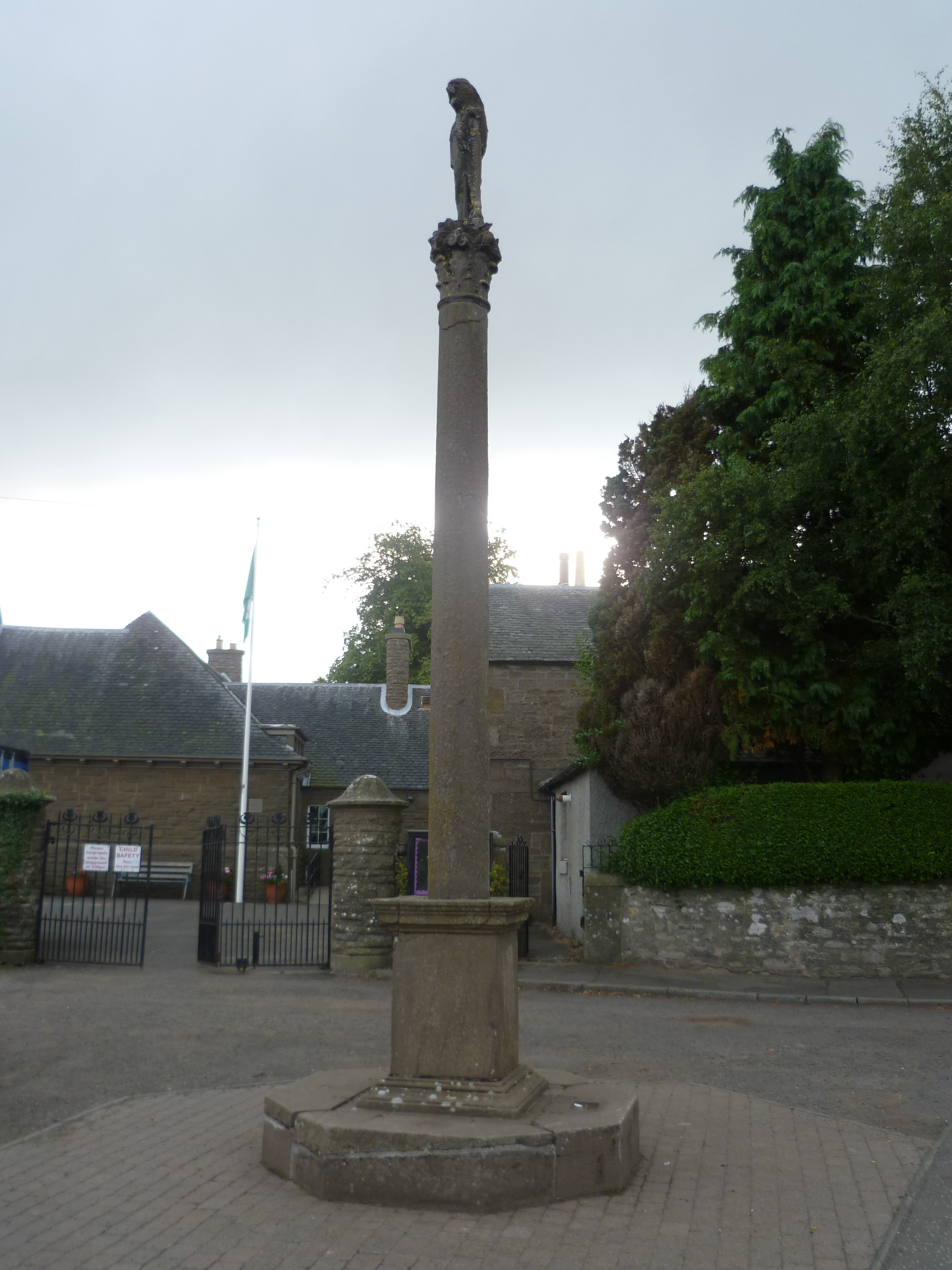
The mercat cross in the centre of the village

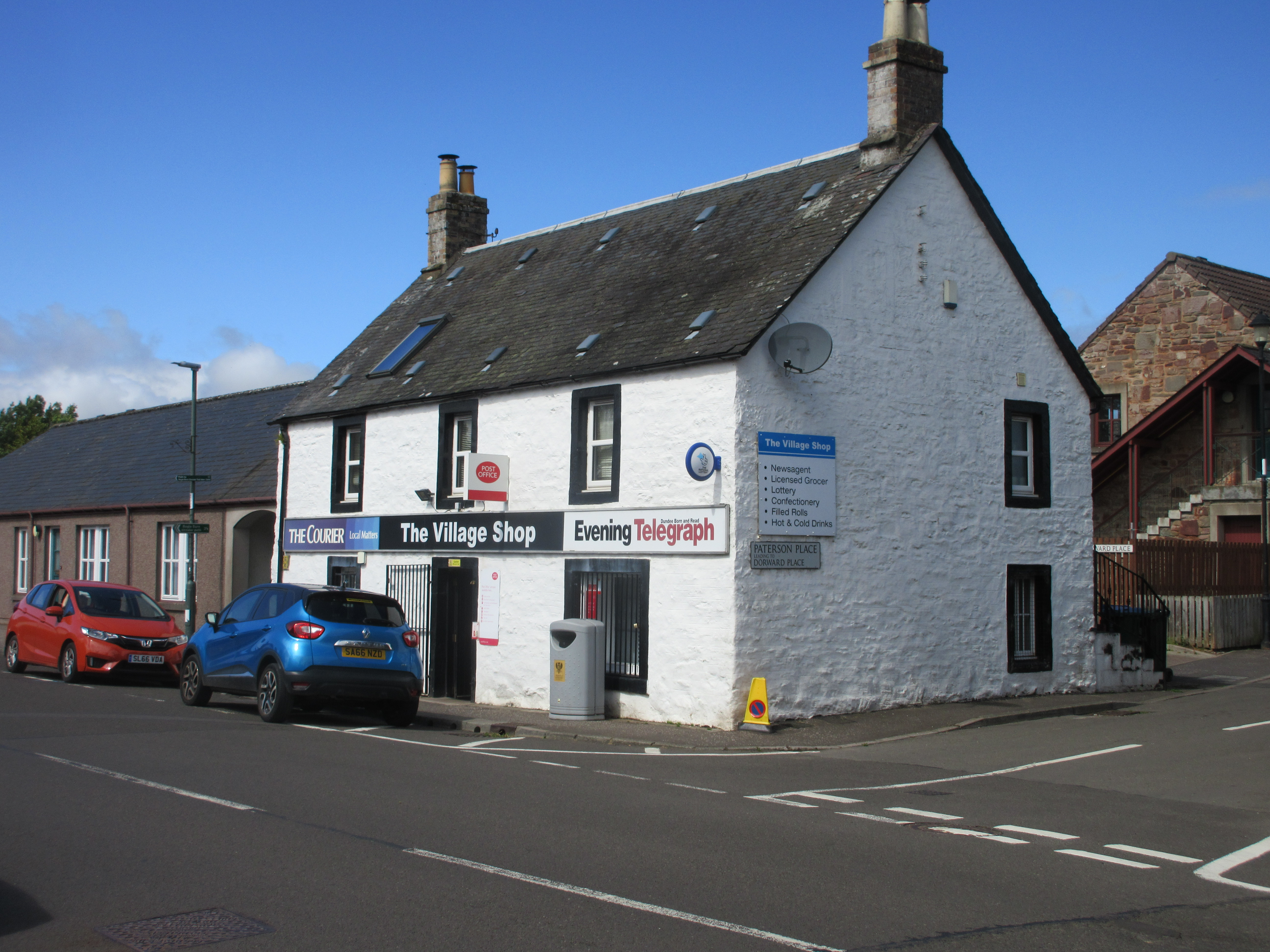
The village shop

Main Street is one of the oldest parts of the village. It contains the oldest cottages in the village and the bowling club, police station, Architects Office, primary school, Coaching Inn, church and village shop. The 17th-century mercat cross is protected as a category A listed building. Castle Road is another of the oldest streets in Longforgan, and as the name suggests, was the main road from the church down to Castle Huntly. Many of the houses are original whitewashed cottar houses used in the past by land workers on the estate. This 'bonny' road down to the Carse of Gowrie is now closed to through vehicle traffic. The primary school in the village can accommodate around 100 pupils in total. The Headteacher is Lauren Budd. The primary school is a grade B listed building and on 22 June 2016, Perth and Kinross Council approved funding for the refurbishment and extension of the primary school as part of a larger programme of primary school modernization. The school underwent the refurbishment and extension between April 2019 and February 2021.

The Eastbank area was developed in the 1960s, and Paterson was built in the 1970s, to accommodate the village's growing population, it is situated in the north of the village. Dorward Place was re-developed (completion 1997) from an old Farm Site (An Aerial photograph of the original site is hung in the housing complex) and consists only of sheltered servite housing. Westbank was originally farms but was transformed into houses in 2001. Rosamunde Pilcher Drive is located in this estate, and is named after the bestselling author Rosamunde Pilcher who lived in Longforgan. Built in the 2000s, Mary Findlay Drive is the largest modern housing estate in Longforgan with 42 houses and its own park. Worbey Place is situated next to Helen McGregor Park in the east end of Longforgan. The park includes run down tennis courts, a football pitch and a play area. The park is also the location of the annual Longforgan gala day at which the winners of the Longforgan scarecrow trail are displayed.

The only church is situated on the Main Street and is run by the Church of Scotland with the minister being the Rev. Dr. Marjory MacLean. Memorial panels to the Paterson family in the church were designed by Robert Lorimer in 1900. The church acts as a polling place for UK, Scottish and local elections.

The Bogle Burn circuit is a popular walking route that is approximately 2 and a half miles long and is named for the Bogle Burn that is situated to the south of the village.

== Transport ==
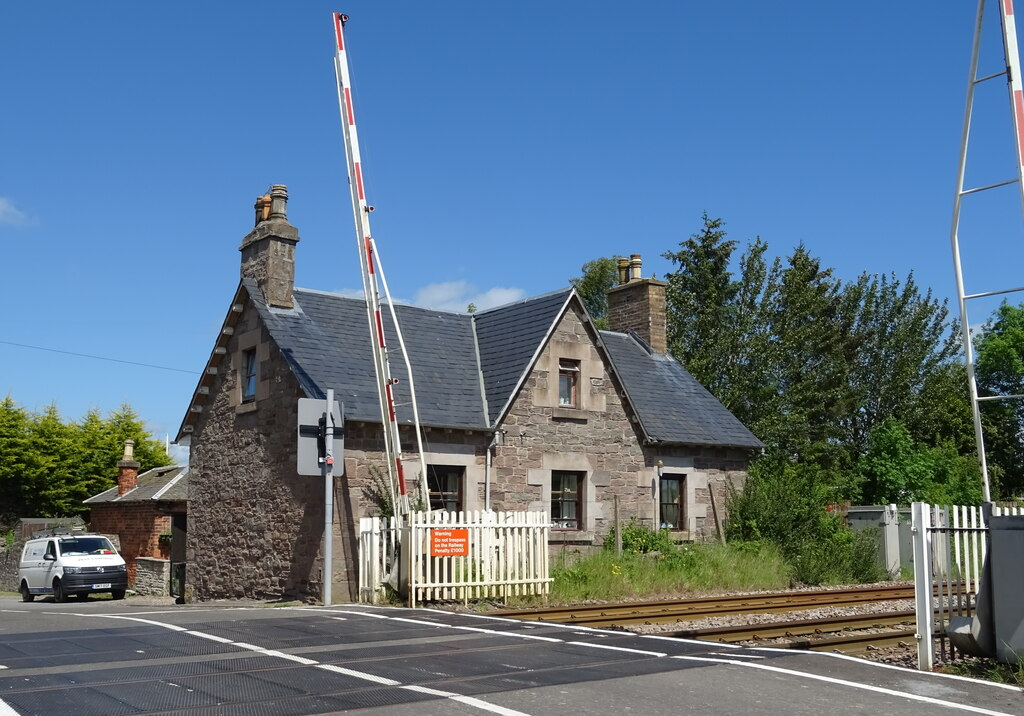
Former railway station building

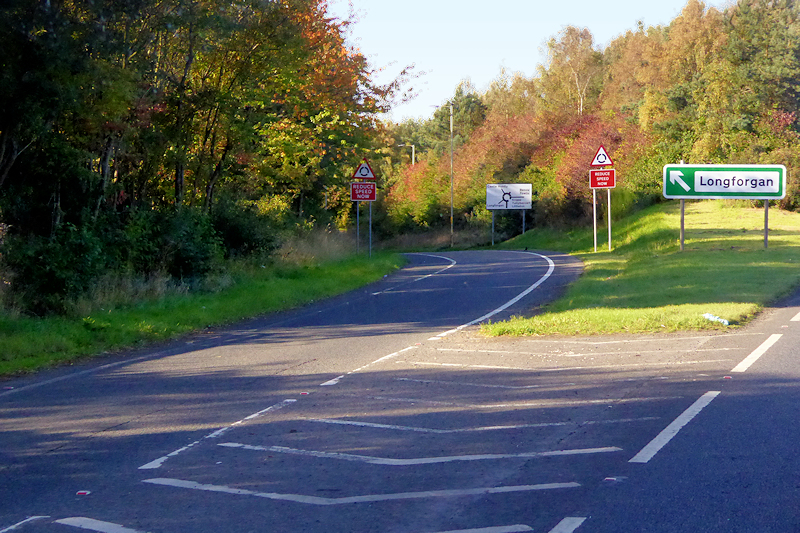
Southbound exit from the A90 at Longforgan

=== Rail ===
The village had a railway station, Longforgan, which was open between 1849 and 1956. It was situated about 1 mile (1.6 km) south of the village on what is now the Glasgow–Dundee line. The village was bypassed to the north in 1952 by what is now the A90.

==== Bus ====
Stagecoach South Scotland provides bus services 39, 39A and 39B, connecting Longforgan Main Street to Dundee, Perth City Centre and PRI. These services, collectively, run hourly throughout the week. From the A90 Westbound Slip Road Roundabout bus stop, Scottish bus operator Ember operates services E1 to Edinburgh and E3 to Glasgow. The services from the westbound roundabout bus stop operate in the opposite direction to Dundee.

== Drimmie ==
Drimmie was an estate in the west of Longforgan parish. A sharp drop-off of 177 feet (54 m) known as the Snabs of Drimmie, "extend[s] north-westward from the bold rocky point of Kingoodie".

== Notable Longforganites ==
- Andrew Marr, television presenter
- Patrick Gray, 6th Lord Gray, Scottish nobleman and politician during the reigns of James VI of Scotland and Mary, Queen of Scots.
- Rosamunde Pilcher, best selling author
- Robin Pilcher, British author
- Alexander Thoms, mineralogist
