= Invergowrie railway station =

Railway station in Perth and Kinross, Scotland

Invergowrie Scottish Gaelic: Inbhir Ghobhraidh
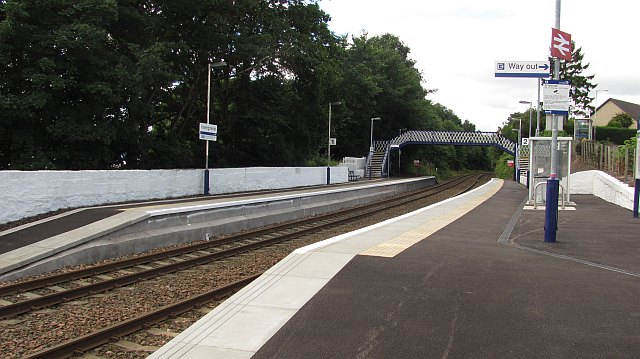

General information
- Location: Invergowrie, Perth and Kinross; Scotland
- Coordinates: 56.4563°N 3.0578°W
- Grid reference: NO349298
- Manager: ScotRail
- Platforms: 2

Other information
- Station code: ING

History
- Opened: 24 May 1847
- Original company: Dundee and Perth Railway
- Pre-grouping: Caledonian Railway
- Post-grouping: LMS

Passengers
- 2021/22: ▲5,166
- 2022/23: ▲10,336
- 2023/24: ▲20,866
- 2024/25: ▲22,066
- 2025/26: ▲28,430
Location
Notes
- Passenger statistics from the Office of Rail and Road

Invergowrie railway station is a railway station which serves the village of Invergowrie, west of the city of Dundee, Scotland on the north bank of the Firth of Tay. It is the only intermediate station between Dundee and Perth, on the Glasgow to Dundee line, approximately 4 miles (6.4 kilometres) from Dundee station – and only around 500 yards (460 metres) from the city's western boundary – and just over 17 miles (27 kilometres) from Perth.

== History ==
It was built by the Dundee and Perth Railway, a constituent company of the Scottish Central Railway and later the Caledonian Railway and opened on 24 May 1847. It was threatened with closure under British Rail in 1985, but survived (although the station at Errol closed).

Transport Scotland announced in March 2016 that Invergowrie would be one of several stations to benefit from a timetable upgrade that will see 200 additional services introduced across the Scotrail network from 2018.

The c.1900 footbridge is category C listed.

=== Accidents and incidents ===
An accident in October 1979, due to a signal passed at danger, killed five people and injured 59 others.

== Facilities ==
The station only has very basic facilities. Platform 2 has a small shelter and a bench outwith the shelter, whilst platform 1 only has a single bench. The only step-free access at the station is between Station Road and platform 2, although the ramp has a moderate gradient. The platforms are linked by a footbridge. As there are no facilities to purchase tickets, passengers must buy one in advance, or from the guard on the train.

== Passenger volume ==
Passenger Volume at Invergowrie
	2004–05	2005–06	2006–07	2007–08	2008–09	2009–10	2010–11	2011–12	2012–13	2013–14	2014–15	2015–16	2016–17	2017–18	2018–19	2019–20	2020–21	2021–22	2022–23	2023–24	2024–25
Entries and exits	1,365	1,740	1,644	1,664	1,144	1,758	2,078	2,338	2,980	4,674	4,404	4,292	4,308	6,096	5,722	5,166	1,942	5,166	10,336	20,866	22,066

The statistics cover twelve month periods that start in April.

== Services ==
As of May 2026, there is a roughly hourly service which calls here to both Glasgow Queen Street and Dundee. A small number of extra trains run at peak times to/from Perth, and there are also a few trains to/from Aberdeen or Arbroath to the east as extensions of the service to Dundee. There is no Sunday service.

Preceding station	National Rail	Following station
Perth	ScotRail; GlasgowｰDundee Line	Dundee
	Historical railways	
Longforgan; Line open; Station closed	Dundee and Perth Railway; Caledonian Railway	Ninewells; Line open; Station closed

== Bibliography ==
- Quick, Michael (2023). Railway Passenger Stations in Great Britain: A Chronology (PDF) (5th ed.). London: Railway and Canal Historical Society.
