= Leetown, Perth and Kinross =

Coordinates: 56.37830°N 3.27756°W

Leetown is a small community located at the western end of the Carse of Gowrie along the eastern seaboard of Scotland.

It lies between the A90 road and the Firth of Tay.
