= Ninewells =

Area of Dundee, Scotland

Coordinates: 56.463190°N 3.038596°W

Ninewells: Scottish Gaelic: Naoi Fuarain; Scots: Ninewells
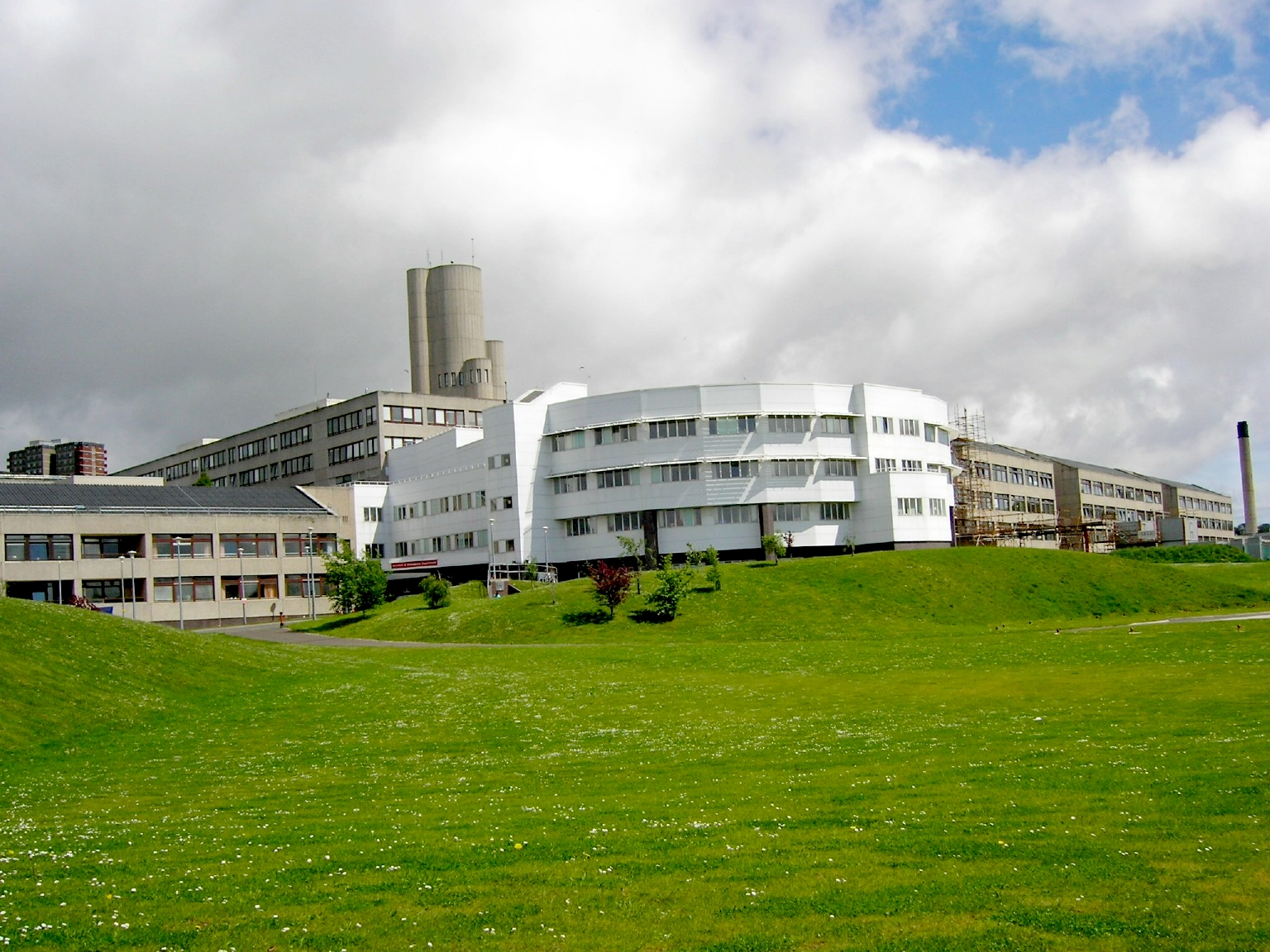
- Ninewells Hospital

- Location within Dundee City council area Location within Scotland
- OS grid reference: NO361306
- Council area: Dundee City
- Lieutenancy area: Dundee
- Country: Scotland
- Sovereign state: United Kingdom
- Post town: DUNDEE
- Postcode district: DD2
- Dialling code: 01382
- Police: Scotland
- Fire: Scottish
- Ambulance: Scottish
- UK Parliament: Dundee West
- Scottish Parliament: Dundee City West

Ninewells (Scots: Ninewells) is an area of Dundee, Scotland. It is most well known for being home to Ninewells Hospital, a major teaching hospital affiliated with the University of Dundee and one of the largest teaching hospitals in Europe. In addition to the hospital, the area features residential neighbourhoods, green spaces, and educational facilities.

== History ==
The name "Ninewells" is believed to have originated from the presence of a number of springs or wells in the area. Historically, the site was largely rural, comprising farmland and woodland, before undergoing significant urban development in the 20th century.

The residential component of Ninewells is largely suburban, with a mix of housing types, including family homes, student accommodation, and flats for healthcare professionals working at Ninewells Hospital. The presence of healthcare facilities has also spurred the development of modern housing estates, making Ninewells a desirable location for medical staff, students, and families.

== Education ==
Ninewells benefits from its proximity to various educational institutions. In addition to the University of Dundee, nearby primary and secondary schools serve the community, including St Ninian's RC Primary School and Harris Academy in the adjacent area of the West End. The connection to the university enhances the academic atmosphere in the area, particularly for medical and healthcare-related disciplines.

== Transport ==
Ninewells is well-served by public transport, with numerous bus routes connecting the area to Dundee city centre and other parts of the city. The area is also conveniently located near Invergowrie Railway Station, which provides rail services to cities like Edinburgh and Glasgow. Road connections via the A90 and Kingsway make the area easily accessible by car.

== Governance ==
Ninewells falls under the jurisdiction of Dundee City Council, which is responsible for local governance, including the provision of public services such as education, transport, housing, and social care. As part of the West End ward, it is represented by several councillors.

At the national level, Ninewells is part of the Dundee West constituency for the Scottish Parliament, represented by a Member of the Scottish Parliament (MSP). In the UK Parliament, it falls within the Dundee West constituency, represented by a Member of Parliament (MP). These elected officials represent the area's interests in both Holyrood and Westminster, covering issues such as healthcare, education, and infrastructure.
