= Inchture =

Village in Perth and Kinross, Scotland

Coordinates: 56.445868°N 3.167898°W

Inchture: Scottish Gaelic: Innis Tùir
- Location within Perth and Kinross
- Population: 1,420 (2020)
- OS grid reference: NO281288
- Council area: Perth and Kinross
- Lieutenancy area: Perth and Kinross
- Country: Scotland
- Sovereign state: United Kingdom
- Post town: PERTH
- Postcode district: PH14
- Dialling code: 01828
- Police: Scotland
- Fire: Scottish
- Ambulance: Scottish
- UK Parliament: Perth and Kinross-shire
- Scottish Parliament: Perthshire North

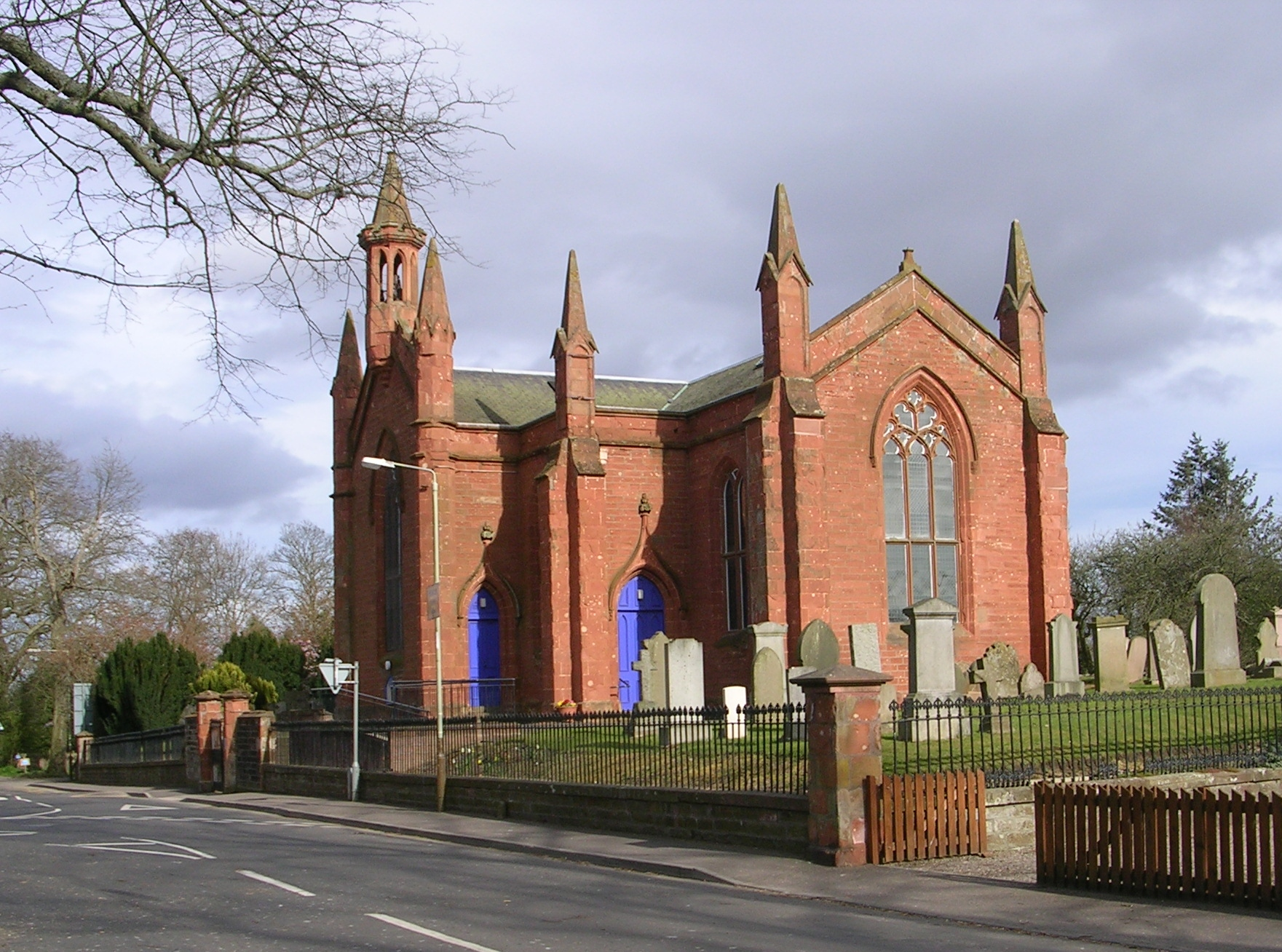
Inchture Church of Scotland church, photo taken from the main street, facing east

Inchture (Scottish Gaelic: Innis Tùir) is a village in Scotland between Dundee and Perth on the northern side of the Firth of Tay. It is approximately nine miles (14 km) from Dundee city centre and 13 miles (21 km) from Perth. The village is bypassed by on the A90 trunk road and benefits from a flyover (grade-separated) junction onto the road making it popular with commuters working in Dundee and further afield.

Inchture is a prosperous village with a wide range of housing. The village comprises a post office, a SPAR store, hotel, a primary school and nursery, community centre, a church. a bowling club, a beauticians and a coffee shop. There are approximately 100 original houses in the village and additional homes have been constructed by Muir Homes, Barratt Homes and Scotia Homes. The population is approximately 1500, with an active Community Council and much community engagement including an annual Village Fete.

Inchture is situated within the Carse of Gowrie.

Inchture is twinned with the village of Fléac near Angoulême in France.

At the north end of the village is a lodge and avenue that formerly led to the mansion of Rossie Priory, now cut off by the modern A90. This avenue is lined on both sides by giant redwood trees (Sequoiadendron giganteum). These were planted in 1853, and are the first known examples of the species successfully cultivated outside North America.

An Episcopal Church, All Souls, was opened in 1896, the foundation stone having been laid four years earlier. Before this, the local Episcopalians had worshiped at a chapel on the Rossie Estate and later at a mission in Invergowrie.

Near Inchture is Ballindean House, significant for its association with John Wedderburn of Ballendean (NB spelling) and his slave Joseph Knight and thus with the cause of abolitionism in the United Kingdom.

== Transport ==
=== Inchture Express ===
The Inchture Express was a horse-drawn carriage service operated by the Caledonian Railway Company. Its rails "ran along a hedge-lined route" to Inchture railway station. It later closed and the rails were lifted.

=== Bus and coach services ===
Stagecoach East Scotland operate bus services 16 and 16B to Dundee and Perth City Centre from Inchture Main Road. The services, combined, operate everyday hourly. The company, on Tuesdays and Thursdays only, also operate service 51 to Abernyte, Perth City Centre & PRI. From the A90, at Glebe Drive, Scottish electric coach operator Ember runs direct coach services from Inchture to Edinburgh half hourly, Dundee at least half hourly and Aberdeen & Glasgow hourly. These services must be pre-booked, otherwise they won't stop. (Note: Ember services to Dundee and Aberdeen and Citylink services to Dundee call at Inchture Ballindean Farm) Also for Dundee and Glasgow is the Scottish Citylink service M8.

== Notable people ==
- Andrew Heiton (1823–1894), architect

== See also ==
- Abernyte
