= All Saints Church, Glencarse =

Church in Perth and Kinross, Scotland

Coordinates: 56°22′48″N 3°18′09″W

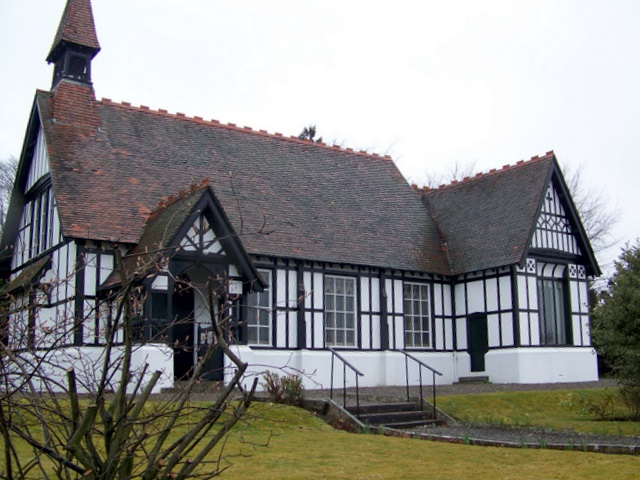
All Saints Church, Glencarse

All Saints Church is an Episcopal church in the Diocese of Brechin, located in the Scottish village of Glencarse, Perth and Kinross.

Still in use as a congregational church, the building is constructed in the half-timbered style, and on 9 June 1981 was listed as a category C listed building.
