= Errol railway station =

Disused railway station in Errol, Perth and Kinross

Errol
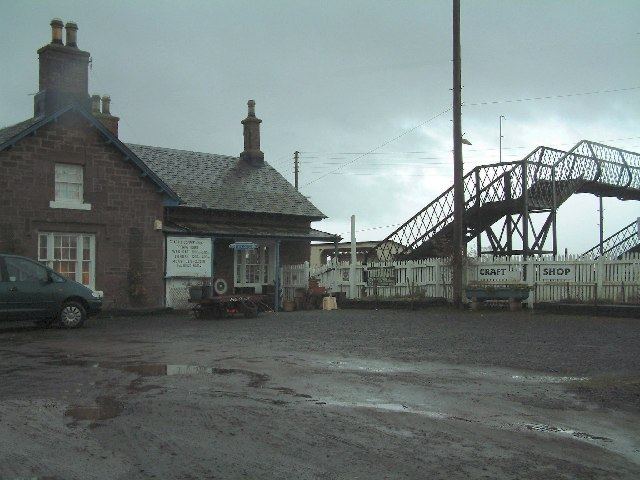
- The site of the station in 2006

General information
- Location: Errol, Perth and Kinross; Scotland
- Coordinates: 56.4072°N 3.211°W
- Grid reference: NO253245
- Platforms: 2

Other information
- Status: Disused

History
- Original company: Dundee and Perth Railway
- Pre-grouping: Caledonian Railway
- Post-grouping: London, Midland and Scottish Railway; British Rail (Scottish Region)

Key dates
- 24 May 1847: Opened
- 30 September 1985: Closed
Location

Errol railway station served the village of Errol, Perth and Kinross, Scotland, from 1847 to 1985 on the Dundee and Perth Railway.

== History ==
The station opened on 24 May 1847 by the Dundee and Perth Railway. The goods yard was to the north and it consisted of four sidings. The signal box, which was built in 1890, was to the west. The station avoided the fate of others on the line in the 1950s and 1960s, but by the early 1980s was served by just a handful of services each weekday (and none on Sundays). British Rail issued statutory closure notices for the station in the summer of 1984 and it closed to both passengers and goods traffic on 30 September 1985.

Both the station house and the 1877 signal box still survive, each being listed structures. The latter also operates a barrier level crossing.

Preceding station	Historical railways	Following station
Inchture; Line open, station closed	Dundee and Perth Railway	Glencarse; Line open, station closed
