= Muir Group =

British property development company

J.W.Muir Group Public Limited Company
- Formerly: Aboot Limited (1975–1976); J W Muir Group Limited (1976–1991)
- Company type: Private
- Industry: Housebuilding; Property; Timber processing
- Headquarters: Inverkeithing, Scotland, UK
- Website: muirgroup.co.uk

J.W.Muir Group Public Limited Company, trading as Muir Group and based in Inverkeithing, Fife, is one of the largest privately owned property development company specialising in timber-framed construction of houses and apartments companies in Scotland.

== History ==
The company was established by a former joiner, John Muir, in 1973, following his departure as managing director of Scothomes, part of Scottish Homes. John Muir would serve in a senior capacity at the company for over 50 years; Muir's sons, Ronnie and Alan, have also served as directors of Muir Group.

During the 2000s, the company pursued various Private Finance Initiative (PFI) opportunities, such as schemes to deliver social housing. Muir Group has also been involved in the construction of new retail sites for customers such as Morrisons.

In mid 2011, the company recorded a steep increase in year-on-year profits. During late 2017, it was announced that Muir Group planned to build up to 75 per cent more new homes each year in a bid to ensure the availability of adequate affordable housing.

In the early 2020s, Muir Group announced that it would be building a greater proportion of bungalows in some of its housing schemes in response to demographic changes. During 2022, the firm relaunched its shared ownership offering aimed at providing affordable housing. That sane year, Muir Group completed a stock transfer with Manchester Jewish Housing Association to expand its independent living provision.

By 2023, Muir Group comprised six subsidiaries, including construction, homes, timber systems, property development, and property investment arms, as well as owning and operating Deer Park Golf and Country Club in Livingston; by this point, the company had developed £1.5 billion's worth of commercial buildings across the UK and had built in excess of 4,000 homes across Scotland. That same year, the firm incurred a loss of £127,000; this increased to £2.8 million during the following year.
