= Dundee West railway station =

Disused railway station in Dundee, Scotland

- Dundee West railway station on 1 May 1965 (top); during its demolition the following year (bottom)

General information
- Location: Dundee, Dundee; Scotland
- Coordinates: 56.4581°N 2.9698°W
- Grid reference: NO403299
- Platforms: 2

Other information
- Status: Disused

History
- Original company: Dundee and Perth Railway
- Pre-grouping: Caledonian Railway
- Post-grouping: London, Midland and Scottish Railway

Key dates
- 24 May 1847: Opened as Dundee
- 1848: Name changed to Dundee West
- 1853: Name changed to Dundee West Street
- 1856: Name changed to Dundee Union Street
- 1866: Name changed back to Dundee West
- 1 May 1965: Closed
Location

Dundee West railway station served the city of Dundee, Scotland, from 1847 to 1965 on the Dundee and Perth Railway. Author John Minnis has described demolition of the "wonderful" station building (built between 1889 and 1890) as "perhaps the most tragic loss" of a piece of railway architecture in Scotland.

== History ==
The original station, which was made of wood, opened as Dundee on 24 May 1847 by the Dundee and Perth Railway and was the eastern terminus of the line, Goods facilities were on both sides of the station with one line serving Dundee Earl Grey Dock, which was to the east. It went through a lot of names; the station's name was changed to Dundee West in 1848, changed to Dundee West Street in 1853, changed to Dundee Union Street in 1856 and eventually changed back to Dundee West in 1866. The station was rebuilt twice: once in 1864 and again in 1890, this one being built to the west of the second station. The station closed to both passengers and goods traffic on 1 May 1965, the last train departing for Glasgow at 8 P.M. It was demolished the following year to make way for a bypass to the new Tay Road Bridge.

The third station, built for the Caledonian Railway in 1889–1890, was designed by Thomas Barr. It was of red sandstone and built in the Scottish Baronial style. Scottish architectural historian Charles McKean, and his co-authors of a book on Dundee's lost architectural heritage, described the building as "overly bombastic in nature" and suggest that it was built as "a gesture of defiance" by the Caledonian Railway in response to the arrival of an alternate route in Dundee run by its bitter rival the North British Railway via the Tay Rail Bridge. It was demolished upon closure. Trains ran to Manchester, Liverpool and London, while local traffic took passengers to Gleneagles, Crieff and Blairgowrie. At its height, the station employed scores of people and handled 15,000 tons of minerals (mostly coal for Dundee's factories).

Preceding station	Historical railways	Following station
Terminus	Dundee and Perth Railway	Magdalen Green; Line partially open, station closed
Terminus	Dundee and Newtyle Railway	Liff; Line partially open, station closed
