= Glencarse =

Village in Perth and Kinross, Scotland

Coordinates: 56.379826°N 3.303526°W

- Location within Perth and Kinross
- OS grid reference: NO196216
  - Edinburgh: 47 mi (76 km)
  - London: 364 mi (586 km)
- Council area: Perth and Kinross
- Lieutenancy area: Perth and Kinross
- Country: Scotland
- Sovereign state: United Kingdom
- Post town: PERTH
- Postcode district: PH2
- Dialling code: 01738
- Police: Scotland
- Fire: Scottish
- Ambulance: Scottish
- UK Parliament: Perth and North Perthshire
- Scottish Parliament: North Tayside; North East Scotland

Glencarse (/ɡlɛnˈkɑːrs/) is a village in the Scottish council area of Perth and Kinross.

The village is situated 4 miles (6 kilometres) east of Perth, lying alongside the A90 road. It was formerly served by Glencarse railway station on the Caledonian Railway.

John Murray, a former Provost of St Mary's Cathedral, Glasgow was the incumbent of the Scottish Episcopal Church’s All Saints Church in the village from 1959 to 1970.
