= Inchture railway station =

Disused railway station in Inchture, Perth and Kinross

Inchture
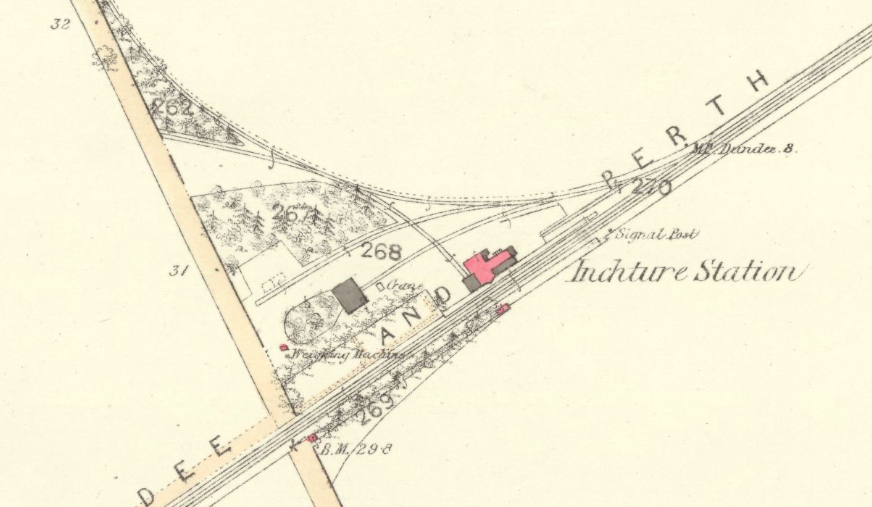
- From the Ordnance Survey 1st series 25 inches to the mile map ca. 1863

General information
- Location: Inchture, Perth and Kinross; Scotland
- Coordinates: 56.4251°N 3.1577°W
- Grid reference: NO286264
- Platforms: 2

Other information
- Status: Disused

History
- Original company: Dundee and Perth Railway
- Pre-grouping: Caledonian Railway
- Post-grouping: London, Midland and Scottish Railway

Key dates
- 24 May 1847: Opened
- 11 June 1956: Closed
Location

Inchture railway station served the village of Inchture, Perth and Kinross, Scotland from 1847 to 1956 on the Dundee and Perth Railway.

== History ==
The station opened on 24 May 1847 by the Dundee and Perth Railway. A passenger tramway served Inchture Village to the north. The trams and the tramway started from one of the tramways in the station's good yard. The station closed to both passengers and goods traffic on 11 June 1956.

Preceding station	Historical railways	Following station
Longforgan; Line open, station closed	Dundee and Perth Railway	Errol; Line open, station closed
