= Dundee and Perth Railway =

UK railway company

Overview
- Locale: Scotland
- Dates of operation: 31 July 1845–31 July 1863
- Successor: Scottish Central Railway

Technical
- Track gauge: 4 ft 8 1/2 in (1,435 mm)

The Dundee and Perth Railway (D&PR) was a Scottish railway company. It opened its line in 1847 from Dundee to a temporary station at Barnhill and extended to Perth station in 1849. It hoped to link with other railways to reach Aberdeen and changed its name to the Dundee and Perth and Aberdeen Railway Junction Company, but this early attempt was frustrated, and for some years it failed to make a physical connection with other railways in Dundee.

It was taken over by the larger Scottish Central Railway in 1863.

Most of its main line is still in use today as the Perth to Dundee section of the railway network.

== History ==
=== The first railways ===
By 1840 Dundee was already served by two railways: the Dundee and Newtyle Railway had opened in 1831, connecting the city and harbour with the fertile agricultural area of Strathmore. The line had three rope-worked inclines with the sections either side operated by horses, and it had primitive stone block sleeper track with fish-bellied rails, to the unusual gauge of 4 ft 6.5 in (1,384 mm). The other early Dundee railway was the Dundee and Arbroath Railway (D&AR); this too had primitive permanent way, to its own unusual track gauge of 5 ft 6 in (1,680 mm). It had opened in 1838 - 1840 (in stages). There was a third railway in Angus, the Arbroath and Forfar Railway; like the D&AR it had the primitive track construction and the same track gauge. It too had opened in 1838 - 1839. None of these railways connected with one another, and none of them was commercially successful.

A railway between Dundee and Perth had been proposed in the 1830s, but there was hostility from influential local people and the idea had been dropped.

=== A Perth line proposed ===
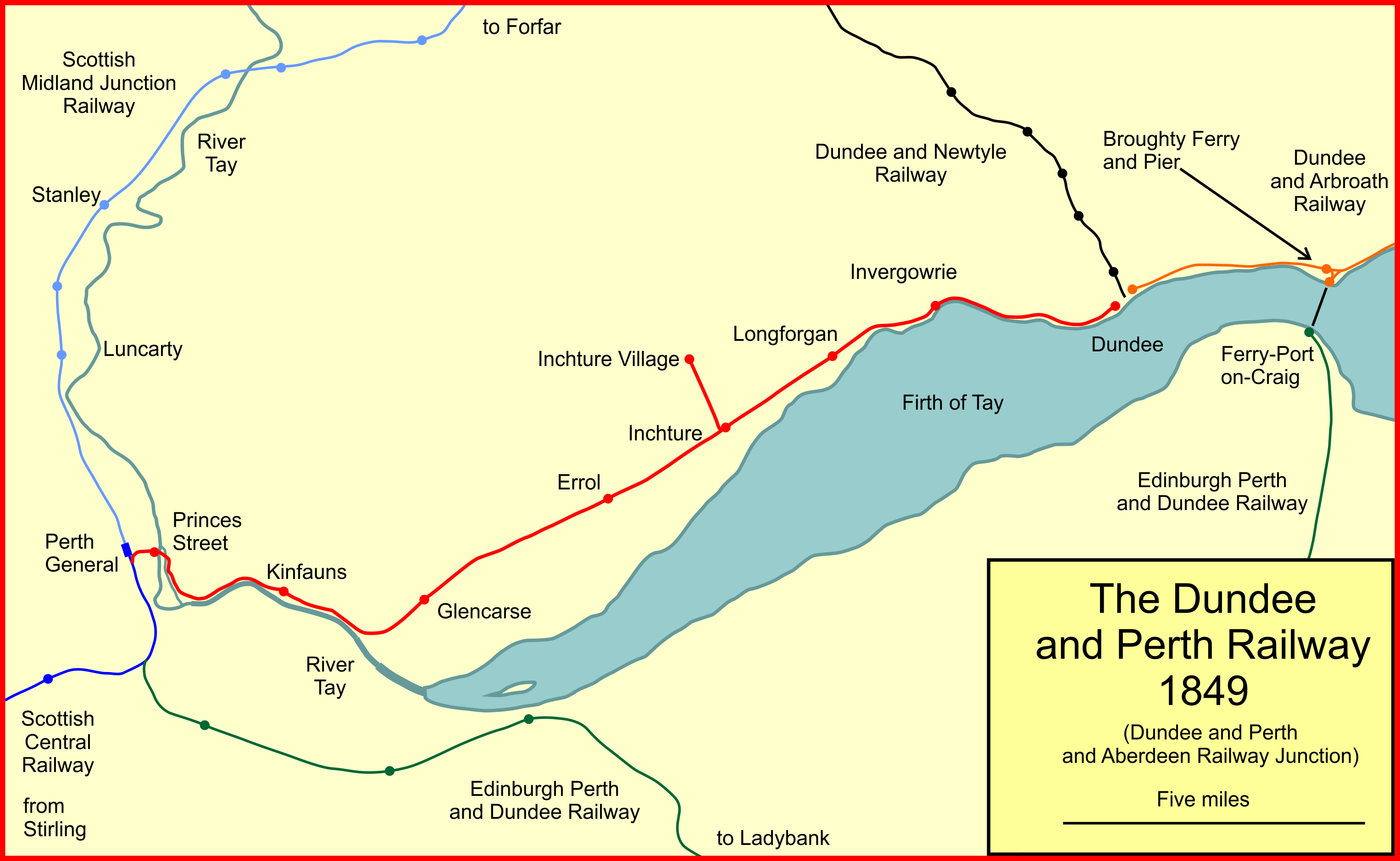
System map of the Dundee & Perth Railway 1849

It was reported in 1835 that the population of Dundee had doubled in the previous twenty years; industry and trade through the harbour were growing considerably, and definite proposals were made for a line from Dundee to Perth. Insuperable opposition from powerful landowners made the scheme impossible to pursue, and it was dropped.

Dundee and Perth Railway Act 1845
- Act of Parliament
- Parliament of the United Kingdom
- Long title: An Act for making a Railway from the Royal Burgh of Dundee in the County of Forfar to the Royal Burgh or City of Perth in the County of Perth, to be called "The Dundee and Perth Railway."
- Citation: 8 & 9 Vict. c. clvii

Dates
- Royal assent: 31 July 1845

In the 1840s there was a lengthy period of debate about the best route to connect central Scotland by rail to the emerging English network. For some time it was assumed that only a single route would be viable, and the argument was fierce. This stimulated consideration of other routes in Scotland, and it resulted in a frenzy of railway schemes being promoted. Building on the positive public mood towards railway projects, a public meeting in Dundee in January 1845 determined that a railway to Perth was now necessary, and a parliamentary bill was presented for that session. The Dundee and Perth Railway received its authorising act of Parliament, the Dundee and Perth Railway Act 1845 (8 & 9 Vict. c. clvii) on 31 July 1845.

The line was to be a little under 21 miles (34 km) in length. The track gauge of 5 ft 6 in (1,680 mm) was considered, in accordance with the two existing Arbroath lines, but standard gauge was actually adopted.

The 1845 session saw many other Scottish railways authorised: the Caledonian Railway (Glasgow and Edinburgh to Carlisle) was authorised on the same day as the Dundee and Perth Railway; its share capital was to be £1.5 million. The Scottish Central Railway was one of the others authorised that day; it was to build from Castlecary, on the Edinburgh and Glasgow Railway, to Perth. Other lines were to create a northward axis to Aberdeen.

The Caledonian Railway was naturally the most significant railway in this spate of authorisations, and even before its act of Parliament it saw its destiny as controlling large tracts of Scotland; but with no cash to spend, it set about concluding agreements with the other (as yet unauthorised) lines to lease them. This would need no money at first, and would simply incur a lease charge periodically once the lines had been built.

Dundee and Perth Railway (Amendment) Act 1846
- Act of Parliament
- Parliament of the United Kingdom
- Long title: An Act to enable the Dundee and Perth Railway Company to alter their Line at Inchyra and Lairwell, and to extend the same towards the Penitentiary at Perth.
- Citation: 9 & 10 Vict. c. ccxxviii

Dates
- Royal assent: 27 July 1846

During construction the Dundee and Perth company arranged to lease the Dundee and Newtyle Railway for 999 years for a lease charge of £1,400 per annum; this was authorised by the Dundee and Perth Railway (Amendment) Act 1846 (9 & 10 Vict. c. ccxxviii) of 27 July 1846, and seems to have been done to prevent the Scottish Midland Junction Railway, then building from Perth to Forfar, from using the Newtyle line to gain access to Dundee.

=== Construction and opening ===
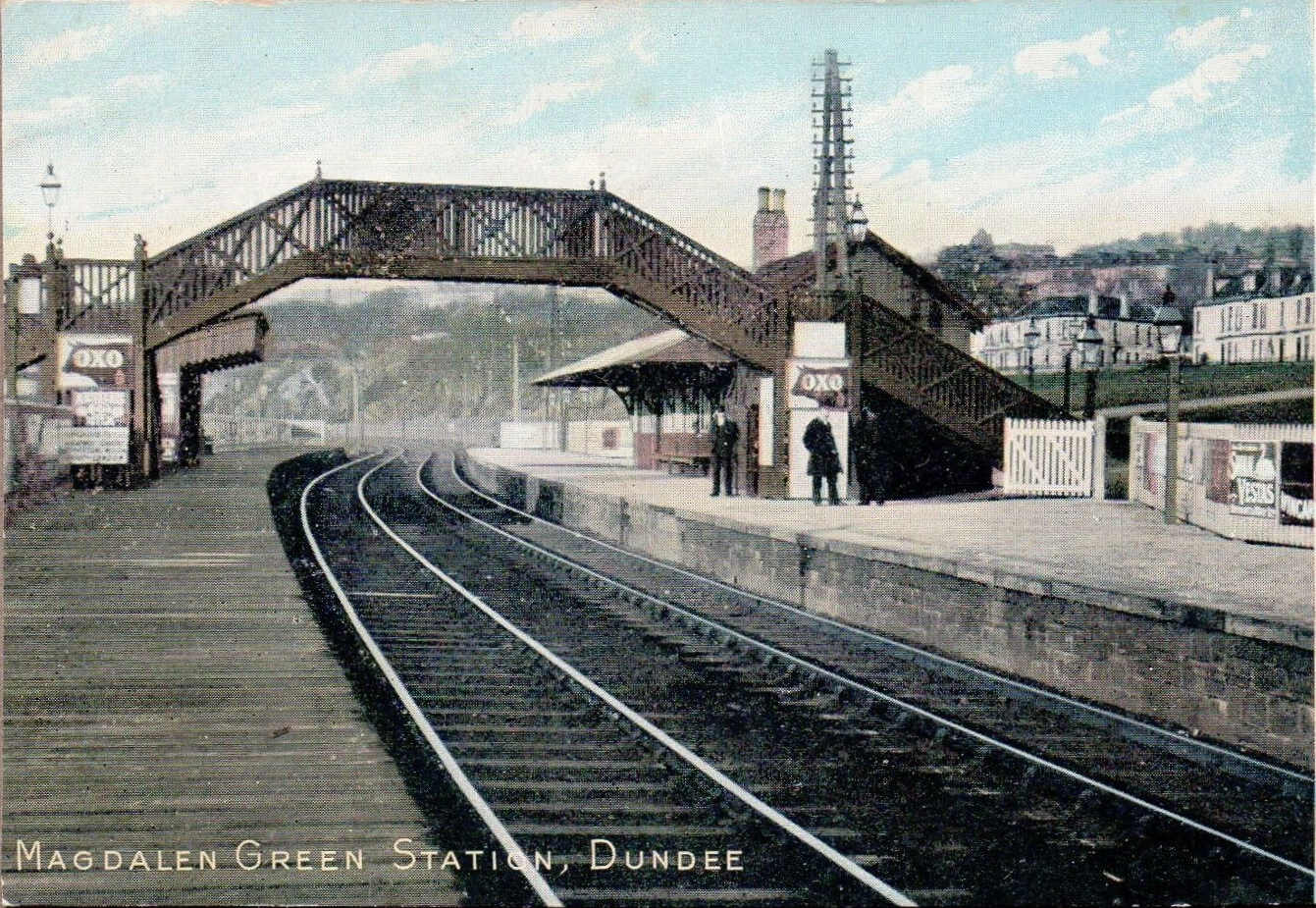
Magdalen Green station, Dundee

As well as renewed and serious opposition from landowners on the route, the new line experienced difficulty with the people of Perth. The proposed terminal was to be at South Inch, open parkland popular with the people of Perth once described as "the pride and ornament of Perth". The D&PR was not active in gaining positive public opinion, and the idea was unwelcome to the Burgh, and a proposed bridge across the Tay was objected to. To secure the passage of its act of Parliament the company agreed, for the time being, to terminate at Barnhill, on the east side of the River Tay and some distance south of Perth (road) Bridge, a significantly inconvenient location.

The Scottish Central Railway (SCR) had planned a terminal there, but now altered its plan and proposed a station in a more westerly location. As it became clear that several railways all wished to have a terminal in Perth, the idea of a "General" or joint station arose. When the SCR obtained an enabling act of Parliament for the station, the Scottish Central Railway Consolidation Act 1859 (22 & 23 Vict. c. lxxxiii), there was a period during which other railways could serve notice that they wished to use it; the Scottish Midland Junction Railway and the Edinburgh and Northern Railway gave the necessary notice but the D&PR failed to do so. The SCR accordingly settled on a location somewhat further north than had been contemplated earlier, as it was apparently not necessary to allow for the D&PR alignment. The D&PR now settled on a second temporary terminus at Princes Street while it decided on its approach to the joint station. At least this was on the west side of the Tay, but it was not at all central.

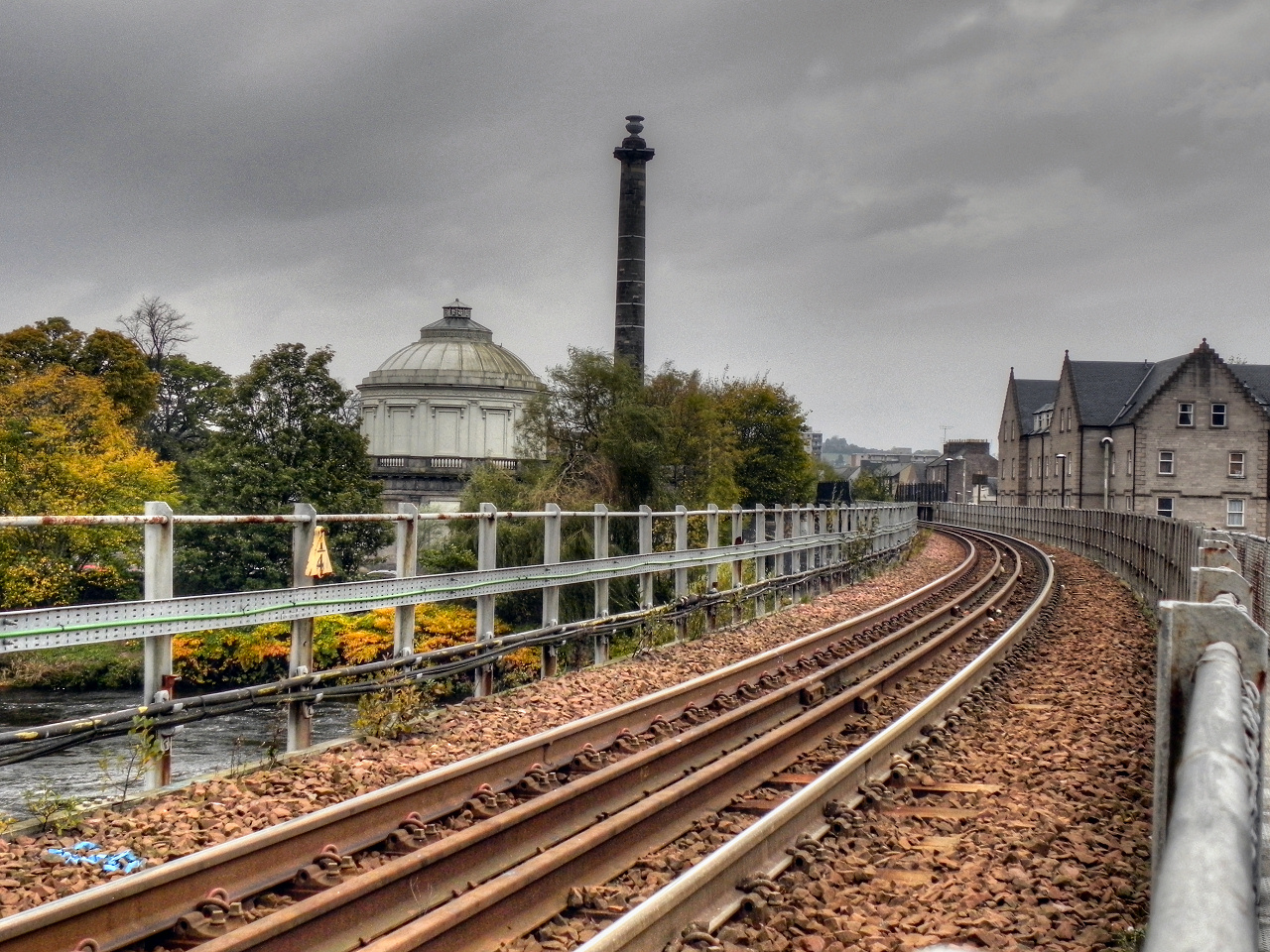
The line just west of the bridge spanning the Tay at Perth

At the end of October 1846 the D&PR finally decided that it wished to use the joint station; its discussions with the SCR, although received as rather arrogant, were just in time to influence the design of the station. This was announced at a shareholders' meeting in October 1846: "a station in Perth west of the town was being arranged, enabling connection with the Scottish Central Railway and the Edinburgh and Northern Railway. There were also to be three short branches added to the system, although in fact only one of them, at Inchture, was completed.

A ceremonial opening of the line was arranged for 22 May 1847. A horse omnibus connection plied from Barnhill to the centre of Perth, and a booking office was opened in the centre.

The public opening took place on 24 May 1847; it was the first railway in Perth.

=== Dreams of going on to Aberdeen ===
Dundee and Perth Railway (Dundee Junction) Act 1848
- Act of Parliament
- Parliament of the United Kingdom
- Long title: An Act to enable the Dundee and Perth Railway Company to make a Junction Line of Railway into the Burgh of Dundee.
- Citation: 11 & 12 Vict. c. lii

Dates
- Royal assent: 22 July 1848

Text of statute as originally enacted

In 1847 the directors announced that they had concluded a lease of the Dundee and Arbroath Railway; a new connecting line at Dundee was to be built between the two lines. The D&PR would guarantee an 8% return on the £66,666 cost of building a linking line across the north side of Dundee and the construction of a central station. The lease was authorised by the Dundee and Arbroath Railway Lease Act 1848 (11 & 12 Vict. c. cliv) of 14 August 1848 and the link line was authorised by the Dundee and Perth Railway (Dundee Junction) Act 1848 (11 & 12 Vict. c. lii) on 31 August and the Dundee and Arbroath Railway (Dundee Junction) Act 1848 (11 & 12 Vict. c. cxxix); the former act also renamed the company the Dundee and Perth and Aberdeen Railway Junction (DPARJ). The cumbersome title was explained by the fact that the Dundee and Arbroath line had powers to connect to the Arbroath and Forfar line which was being taken over by the Aberdeen Railway: the lease would connect Perth and Dundee with the Aberdeen Railway.

And be it enacted, That from and after the last Day of the present Session of Parliament the Company by the said first-recited Act incorporated shall no longer be called by the Name of the Dundee and Perth Railway Company, but the said Company shall be called and known, and continue to be incorporated and have Continuance, by the Name of "The Dundee and Perth and Aberdeen Railway Junction Company." — Section 14, Dundee and Arbroath Railway Lease Act 1848 (11 & 12 Vict. c. cliv)

At the end of December 1848 work had begun on the temporary station at Princes Street; there was pressure now from the SCR to connect to their joint station, but the D&PR said that "the Perth branch" had already cost much more than they had expected, and they could not afford to proceed immediately with the extension from Princes Street to the joint station.

On 16 February 1849 Captain Simmons of the Board of Trade inspected the Tay bridge; it was constructed of laminated timber arches with an opening swing bridge section. Although he remarked that the bridge deflected excessively under load, the section of line opened on 1 March 1849.

There continued to be wrangling over the connecting line, and part of the problem was the levels of the approaching line compared with the SCR line. However, this was eventually resolved and the D&PR finally reached the SCR; the trains passed the joint station southwards past the point of junction, and then reversed into the station.

=== An attempted lease by the Caledonian ===
Now the Caledonian Railway announced that it had concluded an agreement to lease the DPARJ at 8% of its capital cost. At this time the Caledonian was undergoing a crisis, as it had been making lease agreements with many different line; the lease agreements required no cash down, but represented a heavy ongoing drain on profits later, and shareholders were angered by the DPARJ and other leases. In February 1849 the Caledonian announced that it was not proceeding with the lease. The DPARJ demanded the lease payment for the period until then, but the Caledonian simply refused, saying it had never been acted upon, and in any case it had had no power to make the lease agreement: it was ultra vires.

This meant that the proposed line linking the D&AR and the Perth line was not built, and the only link was the horse tramway running through the streets, belonging to the Harbour Commissioners.

=== The Inchture tramway ===
A one and a half miles (2.4 km) branch was built from Inchture station to the Turnpike crossroads (referred to as Crossgates Tramroad station) at Inchture. It was constructed with light T-section rails and was mainly horse operated. It opened on 1 February 1848. It was extended later to a brick works and clay pit, and occasional locomotive use took place for goods traffic and possibly for harvest workers' special trains, although locomotives were prohibited from the time the Caledonian Railway took over the line.

The Inchture tramway closed on 1 April 1916, or 1 January 1917.`

=== Perth station ===
The Perth General station was aligned north–south and the Dundee line approached from the east; the passenger trains passed the station southwards and then reversed into the station. In 1861 separate platforms outside the main station and at right angles to it, were opened for them; they were referred to as the Dundee Dock. Through passenger trains running beyond Perth entered the Dundee Dock and then reversed out of it, continuing their journey southward. The Dundee Dock was in use until 1887.

=== Absorbed by the Scottish Central ===
The 1845 spate of railway authorisations had created many small companies, and the mood now was for consolidation. The Scottish Midland Junction Railway and the Aberdeen Railway linked up to form the Scottish North Eastern Railway, itself to exist for only ten years.

Scottish Central Railway (Dundee, Perth and Aberdeen Railway Purchase) Act 1863
- Act of Parliament
- Parliament of the United Kingdom
- Long title: An Act to vest the Undertaking of the Dundee and Perth and Aberdeen Railway Junction Company, and their Interest in the Dundee and Newtyle Railway, in the Scottish Central Railway Company; and for other Purposes.
- Citation: 26 & 27 Vict. c. ccxxiii

Dates
- Royal assent: 28 July 1863

Text of statute as originally enacted

The dominant Scottish Central Railway (SCR) offered terms to the Dundee and Perth Railway, which were accepted, and the SCR absorbed the D&PR by the Scottish Central Railway (Dundee, Perth and Aberdeen Railway Purchase) Act 1863 (26 & 27 Vict. c. ccxxiii) of 26 July 1863. The leased Dundee and Newtyle line went with the D&PR to the SCR. The SCR too had not long to remain independent. In 1865 the Caledonian Railway absorbed both the SMJR and the SCR.

The SCR was dismayed by the poor quality of the infrastructure and rolling stock it had taken over. The wooden Tay bridge at Perth was obviously in poor condition and was replaced by 1864

The SCR considered the terminus at Dundee West to be a modest and inadequate structure, but worse than that, it was in a dangerous condition, and from 1863 it was extended and reconstructed, opening fully in October 1866.

=== Locomotives ===
DUNDEE & PERTH & ABERDEEN JUNCTION RAILWAY LOCOMOTIVES 1847 to 1863
Name	Wheel Arrangement	Foundry	Built	Acquired	Notes
Earl of Airlie	0-2-4	J & C Carmichael	1833	1847	ex Dundee & Newtyle locomotive No 1, renumbered No: 10 in 1850. Withdrawn 1854.
Kinnaird	2-2-2-0	Tulk & Ley	1846	1850	Scottish Central No 66
Lord Wharncliffe	0-2-4	J & C Carmichael	1833	1847	ex Dundee & Newtyle locomotive No 2, renumbered No: 11 in 1850. Withdrawn 1854
	0-4-2	Kinmond H&S	1847	1850	Scottish Central No 68
Trotter	0-2-4	J & C Carmichael	1834	1847	ex Dundee & Newtyle locomotive No 3, withdrawn 1849
	0-4-2	Kinmond H&S	1847	1850	Scottish Central No 69
John Bull	0-4-0	R Stephenson & Co	1836	1847	ex Dundee & Newtyle locomotive No 4, renumbered No 12 in 1850. Scrapped 1854.
	0-4-2	Kinmond H&S	1847	1850	Scottish Central No 70
Vulcan	2-2-2	Kinmond nH & Steel	1847	1847	Scottish Central No 74
Lucifer	2-2-2	Kinmond H & Steel	1847	1847	Scottih Central No 75
Dundee	2-2-2	Kinmond H & Steel	1847	1847	Scottish Central No 76
Rapid	2-2-2	Kinmond H & Steel	1840	1847	ex Dundee & Arbroath locomotive, Scottish Central No 77
Eclipse	2-2-2WT	G England & Co	1849	1849	Scottish Central No 67
	0-4-0	Bury C & K	1854	1854	Scottish Central No 63
	0-4-0	Bury C & K	1854	1854	Scottish Central No 64
	0-4-0	Bury C & K	1854	1854	Scottish Central No 65
Scorpion	2-4-0	G England & Co	1855	1855	Scottish Central No 6. Sold 1860.
	0-4-0	R Stephenson & Co	1863	1863	Scottish Central No 72
Spitfire	2-4-0	G England & Co	1855	1855	Scottish Central No 23. Sold 1860.
	0-4-0	R Stephenson & Co	1863	1863	Scottish Central No 73
Sprite	2-4-0	G England & Co	1855	1855	Scottish Central No 71

=== The North British Railway ===
The North British Railway (NBR) had become dominant in Fife and had long run through trains to Dundee; however these involved crossing the Tay from Tayport to Broughty Ferry by ferryboat, operated as a train ferry, and then being dependent on the Dundee and Arbroath line to reach Dundee. The NBR obtained an act of Parliament giving authorisation to build a bridge across the Tay: the North British Railway (Tay Bridge and Railways) Act 1870 (33 & 34 Vict. c. cxxxv). Construction proved difficult, and it was not until 31 May 1878 that the bridge was opened.

The Dundee and Perth line approached Dundee at the water's edge, and the entry from the Tay Bridge into Dundee was on reclaimed land on the south side of the D&PR line. The NBR opened a new station near Craig Pier; this was the present day station, located immediately to the south of the D&PR terminus. The NBR line continued eastwards in a cut-and-cover tunnel to connect to the Arbroath line.

On 28 December 1879 the bridge fell during an extremely strong storm, taking a train down with it. 74 or 75 persons lost their lives. The NBR set about constructing a new bridge as soon as possible, despite the obvious difficulties, and it opened the new bridge on 20 June 1887.

When the first bridge opened, the NBR provided a better route to Edinburgh and London than the existing Caledonian route via Perth, and the Caledonian set about improvements to the goods and passenger accommodation at Dundee. Both were considerably expanded, and the new goods accommodation was ready by 1885. A new locomotive depot was provided at the same time. The new passenger station was opened in 1889: "one of the most beautifully proportioned late Victorian buildings in Britain and a celebration of Scottish Baronial architecture.

=== Grouping and nationalisation ===
Following World War I the government determined that the main line railways of Great Britain should be "grouped" into one of four large companies, and it enacted the Railways Act 1921; the Caledonian Railway was a constituent of the new London, Midland and Scottish Railway (LMS), which was formed on 1 January 1923 (although formalities were not legally finalised until July in the case of the Caledonian).

The train service pattern did not change fundamentally; the LMS continued to run the familiar train service.

After World War II, the government nationalised the railways, so on 1 January 1948 the LMS and the other main line railways passed into state ownership: the Scottish section of the LMS and of the rival London and North Eastern Railway became part of British Railways Scottish Region. Still the train service pattern was not radically changed, although diesel multiple units were introduced on local services. A regular service from Dundee West to Edinburgh Princes Street via Perth continued, a remnant of the Caledonian Railway.

The three terminal stations at Dundee were retained for the time being, the cramped accommodation at the former NBR Tay Bridge station deterring the obvious rationalisation. The decline in local passenger use was a greater factor, and Dundee West station was closed on 3 May 1965.

== Current operations ==
Except for the spur into Dundee West station, the line is still open with passenger services provided by ScotRail. The only remaining intermediate station is at Invergowrie.

== Topography ==
The main line opened on 24 May 1847 between Barnhill and the D&PR station at Dundee.

- Perth (General); originally Scottish Central Railway station; D&PR trains used the main station at first by a reversal; Dundee Dock opened October 1862; through platforms for the Dundee line were provided from 1885;
- Perth, Princes Street; opened 1 March 1849, as a terminus until the service was extended to Perth General; closed 1 January 1917; reopened 2 June 1919; closed 28 February 1966;
- Barnhill; opened 24 May 1847 as a terminus until the service was extended to Princes Street; closed on 1 March 1849;
- Kinfauns; closed 2 January 1950;
- Glencarse; closed 11 June 1956;
- Errol; closed 28 September 1985;
- Inchture; station and trailing junction from Inchture Village; closed 11 June 1956;
- Longforgan; may have opened some time after opening of the line; closed 11 June 1956;
- Invergowrie;
- Ninewells Junction; station closed 1865. Trailing junction from the Dundee and Newtyle Railway;
- Magdalen Green; opened June 1878; closed 11 June 1956;
- Dundee Union Street; renamed Dundee West 1866; closed 3 May 1965.
- Inchture Village; opened 1 February 1848; closed 1 January 1917.

== Archives ==
The archives of the Dundee and Perth and Aberdeen Railway Junction Company, which include those of the Dundee and Perth Railway Company are held at the University of Dundee as part of the Shiell and Small, Solicitors Collection. The same collection also includes the records of the Dundee and Newtyle Railway Company.

== Sources ==
- Awdry, Christopher (1990). Encyclopaedia of British Railway Companies. Sparkford: Patrick Stephens Ltd. ISBN 1-8526-0049-7. OCLC 19514063. CN 8983.
- Butt, R. V. J. (October 1995). The Directory of Railway Stations: details every public and private passenger station, halt, platform and stopping place, past and present (1st ed.). Sparkford: Patrick Stephens Ltd. ISBN 978-1-85260-508-7. OCLC 60251199. OL 11956311M.
- Jowett, Alan (March 1989). Jowett's Railway Atlas of Great Britain and Ireland: From Pre-Grouping to the Present Day (1st ed.). Sparkford: Patrick Stephens Ltd. ISBN 978-1-85260-086-0. OCLC 22311137.
