= List of tallest buildings and structures in Edinburgh =

Skyline of Edinburgh
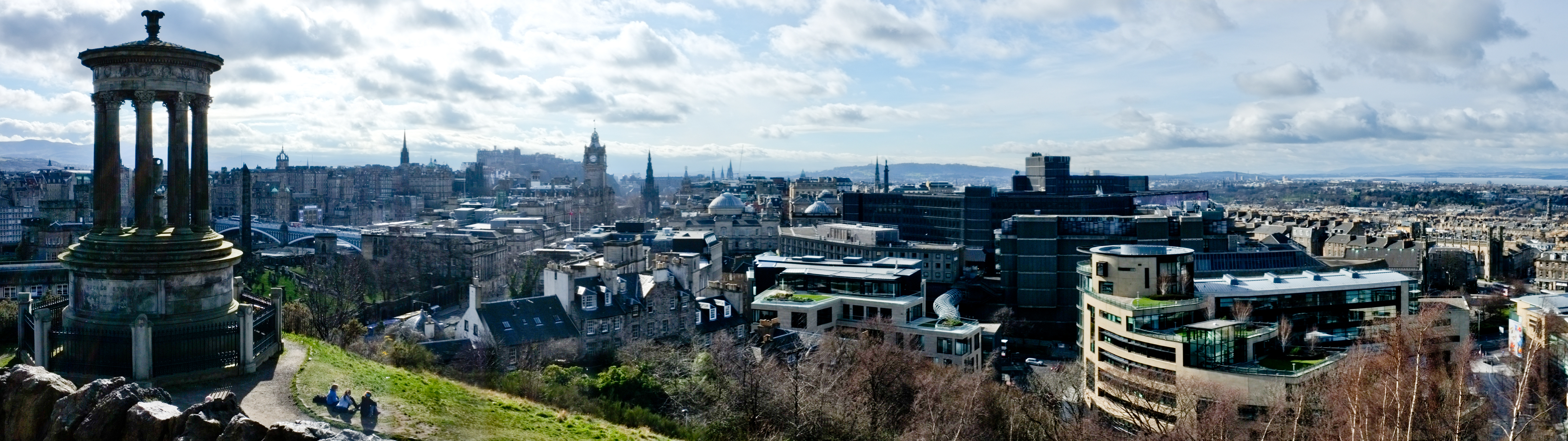
- Edinburgh skyline in 2011
- Tallest building: Martello Court (1967)
- Tallest building height: 64 m (210 ft)
- Tallest structure: Queensferry Crossing (2017)
- Tallest structure height: 207 m (679 ft)

Number of tall buildings
- Taller than 50 m (164 ft): 8

This list of the tallest buildings and structures in Edinburgh ranks buildings in the Scottish city of Edinburgh by height. There are few high-rise buildings in Edinburgh. The tallest buildings in the city are churches and suburban tower blocks. The administrative area of Edinburgh includes the three bridges across the Firth of Forth to the north-east of the city (the Queensferry Crossing, Forth Road Bridge and Forth Bridge), which are all taller than any building in the city itself.

== Tallest buildings ==
This list ranks externally complete buildings in Edinburgh that stand at least 50 metres (160 ft) tall, based on standard height measurement. This includes spires and architectural details but does not include antenna masts. An equals sign (=) following a rank indicates the same height between two or more buildings. The "Year" column indicates the year in which a building was completed. Buildings and structures that have been demolished, including the 365-metre (1,198 ft) chimney of Portobello Power Station, are not included.

Rank	Name	Picture	Height	Location	Floors	Year	Notes
1	St Mary's Episcopal Cathedral		90 m (300 ft)	55.948808°N 3.215832°W	1	1879	
2	Barclay Viewforth Church		76 m (249 ft)	55.940581°N 3.203597°W	1	1864	
3	The Hub		74 m (243 ft)	55.948890°N 3.194705°W	1	1844	
4	Martello Court		64 m (210 ft)	Muirhouse; 55.972350°N 3.262588°W	23	1967	Tallest residential building in Edinburgh.
5	Scott Monument		61 m (200 ft)	55.952365°N 3.193220°W		1844	
6	Fettes College		60 m (200 ft)	55.963593°N 3.226098°W	6	1869	
7=	Citadel Court		59 m (194 ft)	Leith; 55.976560°N 3.177676°W	20	1964	
7=	Persevere Court		59 m (194 ft)	Leith; 55.977001°N 3.178898°W	20	1964	
9	Edinburgh Airport Control Tower		57 m (187 ft)	55.945615°N 3.364224°W		2005	
10=	St George's West Church		56 m (184 ft)	Shandwick Place; 55.949300°N 3.210445°W		1869	
10=	St Peter's Church		56 m (184 ft)	Lutton Place; 55.940112°N 3.179031°W		1865	
12	Exchange Tower		55 m (180 ft)	Canning Street; 55.947297°N 3.210557°W	13	2001	
13	St James the Less Church		55 m (180 ft)	Constitution Street, Leith; 55.972308°N 3.167844°W		1863	
14	Buccleuch Free Church		53 m (174 ft)	West Crosscauseway, Southside; 55.944027°N 3.184817°W		1861	
15=	Balmoral Hotel		52 m (171 ft)	55.953045°N 3.189972°W	10	1902	
15=	Tron Kirk		52 m (171 ft)	55.950040°N 3.187825°W		1663	
15=	The Element		52 m (171 ft)	Western Harbour; 55.985885°N 3.191702°W	17	2009	
18=	Western Harbour Midway		51 m (167 ft)	Western Harbour; 55.985885°N 3.191702°W	17	2009	
18=	The Shore		Western Harbour; 51 m (167 ft)	55.985885°N 3.191702°W	17	2007	
18=	Kirkgate House		51 m (167 ft)	Leith; 55.971314°N 3.170963°W	17	1966	
18=	St Andrew's and St George's Church		51 m (167 ft)	55.953921°N 3.195777°W		1787	On George Street.
22	Portobello and Joppa Parish Church		50 m (165 ft)	Abercorn Terrace; 55.950151°N 3.102718°W		1877	Also known as St Philip's Joppa Church.

== Tallest nonbuilding structures ==
Rank	Structure name	Picture	Height	Coordinates	Year opened	Reference
1	Queensferry Crossing		207 m (679 ft)	55.999270°N 3.416317°W	2017	
2	Forth Road Bridge		156 m (512 ft)	55.996996°N 3.404496°W	1964	
3	Forth Bridge		100.6 m (330 ft)	55.995937°N 3.386411°W	1890	
4	Caledonian Distillery chimney		91.4 m (300 ft)	55.944557°N 3.220366°W	1880	

== See also ==
- List of tallest buildings and structures in Glasgow
