= Friarton Bridge =

Bridge in Perth, Scotland

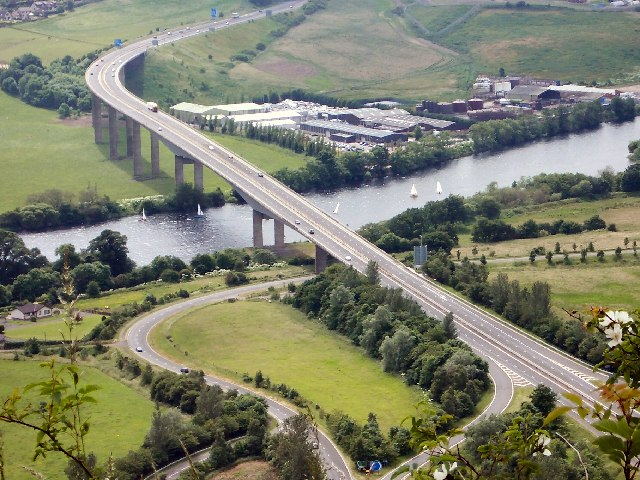
- Friarton Bridge main span, looking southwest from Kinnoull Hill
- Coordinates: 56°22′44.2″N 3°24′33.6″W
- Carries: M90
- Crosses: River Tay
- Locale: Perth

Characteristics
- Design: Segmental
- Total length: 831 m (2,726 ft)
- Longest span: 174 m (571 ft)

History
- Opened: 1978 (48 years ago)

Location
- Interactive map of Friarton Bridge

The Friarton Bridge is a steel box girder bridge with a concrete deck, across the River Tay on the southeastern outskirts of Perth, Scotland. It is located approximately 20 miles (32 km) upstream of the Tay Road Bridge.

At the time of its construction it was the longest span steel girder bridge in the UK and the first to use a composite lightweight concrete deck.

== Design ==
The bridge was constructed by the Cleveland Bridge & Engineering Company with Miller Group as the foundation and concrete sub-contractor, while it was designed by Freeman Fox & Partners, with the team being led by Dr Oleg Kerensky and the resident engineer H Binnie. The site manager for Cleveland was J Robinson and for Miller it was R Gormley.

The bridge consists of a pair of steel box girders (one under each carriageway) 4.3 m (14 ft) wide overlaid by a lightweight concrete deck. The bridge is 831 m (2,726 ft) long, with a river span of 174 m (571 ft). The river span provided a 25 m (82 ft) head room for a width of 46 m (151 ft) of the 76 m (249 ft) wide navigation channel. The boxes vary in depth between 2.7 and 7.5 m (8.9 and 24.6 ft), with the deeper section located close to the river.

It forms part of the eastern spur of the M90 between junctions 10 (Craigend) and 11 (Broxden), the most northerly motorway junction in the UK. It also forms part of the important east coast road corridor from Edinburgh through to Dundee and Aberdeen. It was the single largest structure on the M90, a title it held until the completion of the Queensferry Crossing in 2017. It was the first large box girder bridge to be built to the Merrison Rules, which were introduced in 1973 after the collapse during construction of three box girder bridges during the 1970s. The bridge was strengthened during the 2000s to cope with modern traffic loadings.

The bridge spans the river, the Dundee-Perth railway line, a number of warehouses and the A85 high above the surrounding plain.

It is a two-lane dual carriageway; unusually for a motorway (although not unusually for the M90) neither carriageway has a hard shoulder. When it was built in 1978, it was designated as the M85 motorway. When the A85 from the north end of the bridge to Dundee was renumbered in the early 1990s to A90 through to Dundee, the motorway's designation changed to M90 to provide a continuous route number from Edinburgh through to Fraserburgh.

== Gallery ==
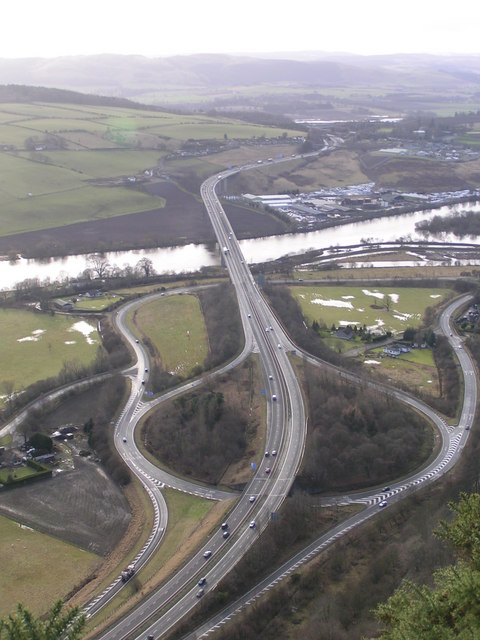
Another view from Kinnoull Hill, showing the M90's junction with the A85

== See also ==
- List of bridges in Scotland
