= M90 motorway =

Motorway in Scotland

M90
- M90 highlighted in blue

Route information
- Part of E15
- Length: 9.7 mi (15.6 km)
- Existed: 1964–present
- History: Constructed 1964–2017

Major junctions
- South end: Junction 1a of the M9
- M9 motorway A823(M) motorway
- North end: Perth (two ends; one east 56.3827°N 3.4065°W, one at Broxden Junction 56.3882°N 3.4869°W)

Location
- Country: United Kingdom
- Primary destinations: Edinburgh, Edinburgh Airport, Queensferry, Dunfermline, Kinross, Perth

Road network
- Roads in the United Kingdom; Motorways; A and B road zones

The M90 is a major motorway in Scotland. It runs from Junction 1A of the M9 motorway, south of the Queensferry Crossing, to Perth. It is the northernmost motorway in the United Kingdom.

The northern point of the motorway splits into two between the Broxden Roundabout (Leading to Perth and the A9 towards Inverness and Thurso) and the A90 towards Dundee and Aberdeen. The southern point leads into the M9 towards Stirling and the M8 towards Edinburgh and Glasgow.

A small part of the M90 (across the Friarton Bridge to the southeast of Perth) was originally numbered as the M85 motorway.

== History ==
The first section of the M90 opened in 1964 to coincide with the opening of the Forth Road Bridge and the A823(M) (Junction 2). The section of the M90, between Crossgates and Kelty opened on 1 December 1969. The stretch between Kinross and Milnathort opened in December 1971.

Two sections were due to begin construction around 1973 and 1974, however, they were put on hold because of the 1973 oil crisis. The section from Arlary (Junction 8 with A91) to Glenfarg was opened in March 1977. Glenfarg to Bridge of Earn opened on 2 October 1980 connecting with the completed Friarton Bridge (which was originally numbered M85, and opened in 1976) and Perth Bypass to Broxden.

The M90 was extended southwards across the Firth of Forth over a new cable-stayed bridge, the Queensferry Crossing, in 2017. A short stretch of the A90 connects the two parts of M90: the short M90 section from the M9 and the much longer M90 section that crosses the Queensferry Crossing and extends to Perth. This short length of the A90 was required at this point as motorway regulations would have prevented certain classes of traffic from using this section of road.

== Details ==
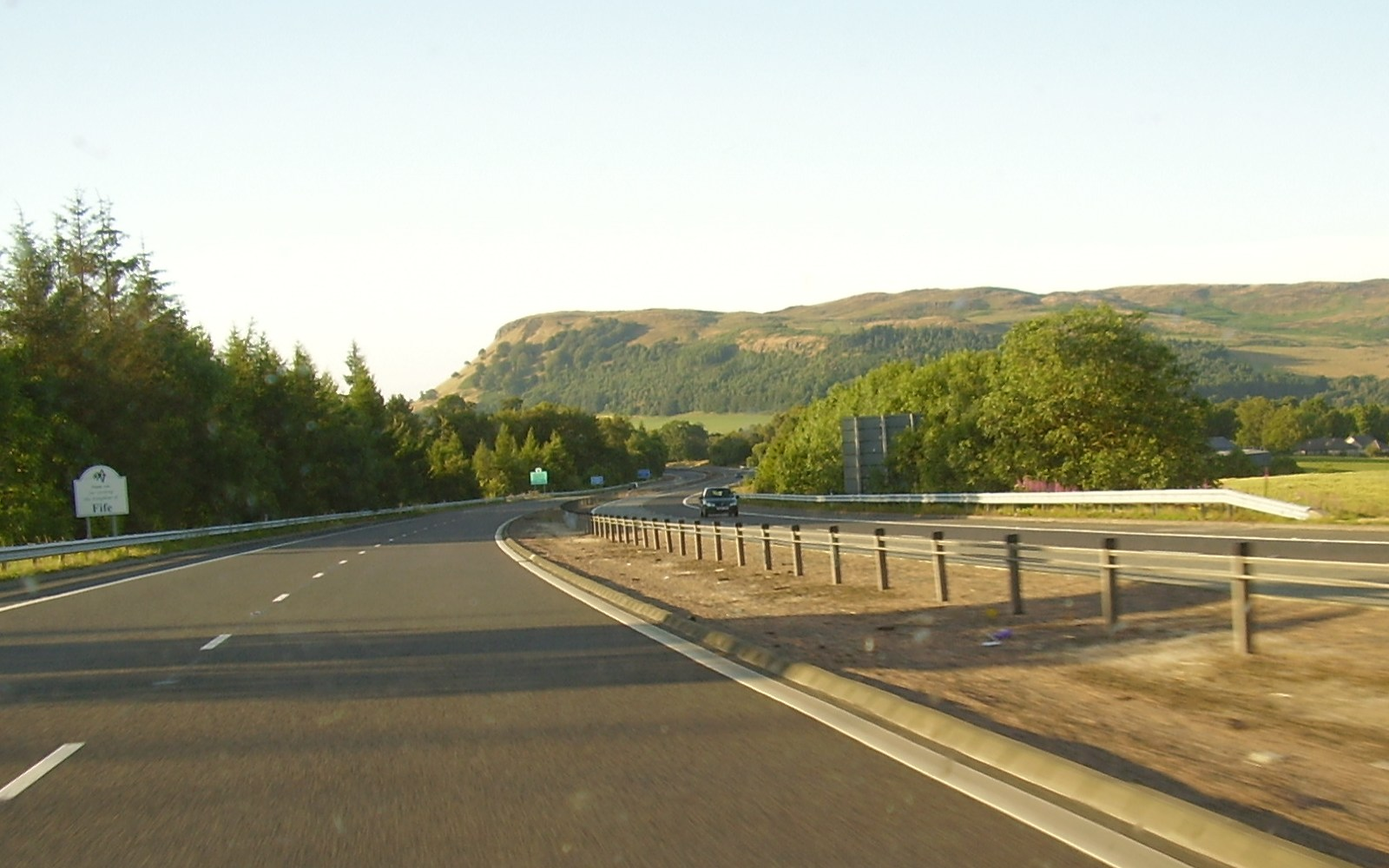
M90, North of Kelty at the boundary between Fife and Perth and Kinross

The M90 leaves the east-west M9 near Kirkliston and heads north. The motorway is interrupted by a short stretch of the A90 from where the A90 from Edinburgh joins the M90. The road continues, however the M90 during this stretch is called the A90. Once it reaches the junction to the south of the Queensferry Crossing the A90 becomes the M90 again at that point. The crossing opened as part of the motorway on 30 August 2017; the bridge is configured as a dual two lane carriageway and has a speed limit of 70 mph (110 km/h).

Previously, the M90's most substantial engineering feature was the Friarton Bridge in Perth, a tall concrete pillared structure which traverses the River Tay. The bridge carries eastbound traffic from Broxden towards Dundee and along the Firth of Tay.

The road constitutes most of the southerly part of the A90 corridor from Edinburgh, through Perth, Dundee and Aberdeen to Peterhead along Scotland's North Sea coast.

A large part of the northern section of the motorway follows the route of the former main railway line between Perth and Edinburgh via Glenfarg, Kinross and the Forth Bridge, which was closed in 1970 despite this not being recommended by the Beeching report.

The Kinross and Milnathort Bypass, the 8-mile (13 km) section of the M90 between Fruix and Arlary, was the first motorway in Scotland to be constructed using concrete pavements that were not reinforced. Both the south- and north-bound carriageways have since been overlaid by tarmac.

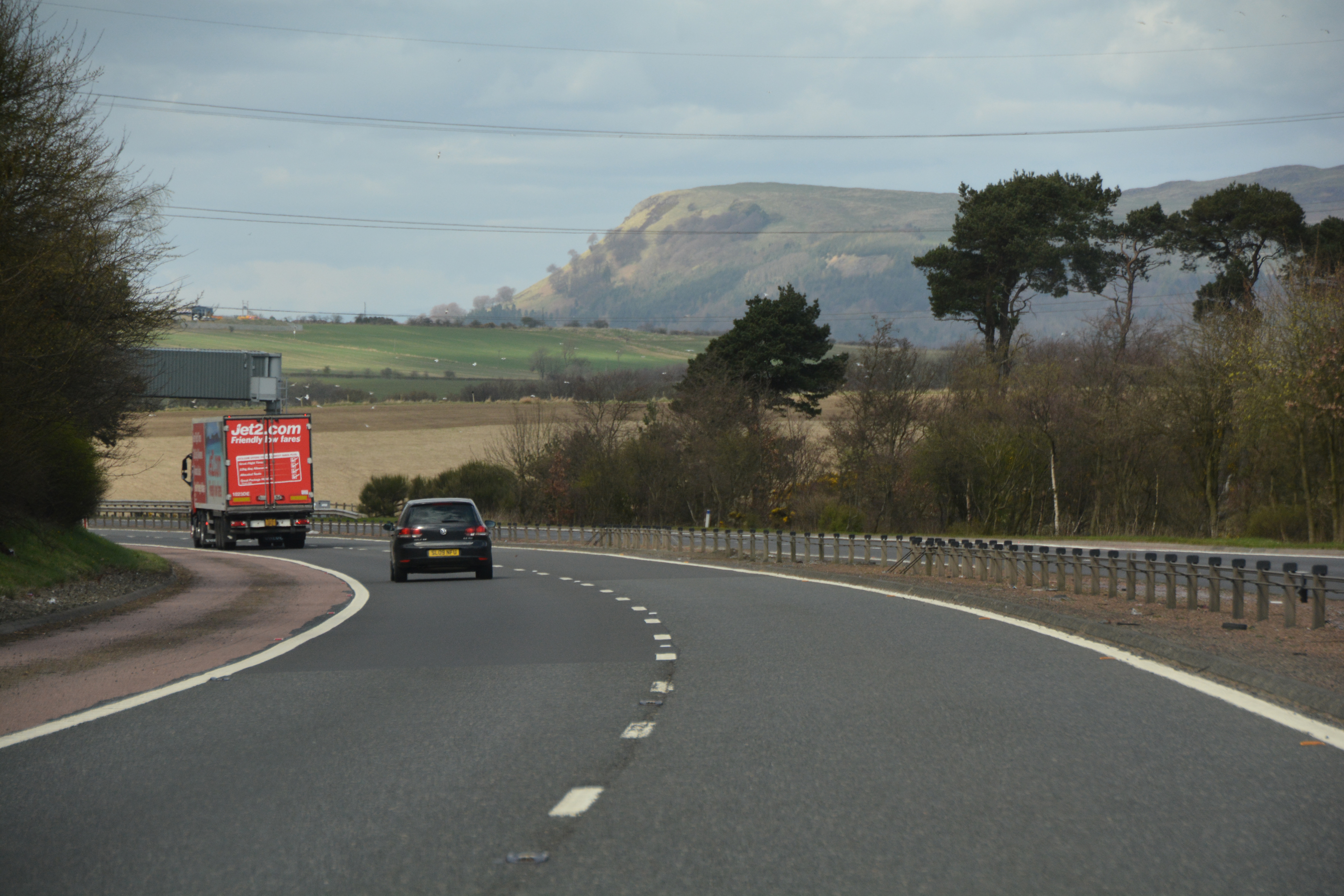
A sharp turn present on the M90

Near to its northern terminus, the motorway splits into two branches. The construction of this three-way interchange required the removal of approximately 900,000 cubic metres (32,000,000 cubic feet) of material, which was mostly rock. The motorway bends through in an acute angle, on a compound curve partly of 520.8 m (1,709 ft) and partly of 694.5 m (2,279 ft) in its radius. One branch heads in a north-easterly direction, flowing into the A90 at its end, numbered junction 11 – this branch was formerly the M85 motorway, until the A85 was renumbered as A90. The other branch forms part of the western bypass of Perth, and meets the A9 at its end, numbered junction 12. The gradient is 4.57% uphill and 5.65% downhill on this section. The slip roads forming this branch merge with shared priority to allow HGVs (also known as Large Good Vehicles or Heavy Goods Vehicles) to maintain momentum on the steep upgrade. The Broxden to Muirmont slip road at the centre of the interchange has a radius of 136.4 m (447 ft 6 in), necessitating maximum superelevation of 7%.

The M90 forms part of the Euroroute E15 which runs from Inverness to Algeciras, however this is not signposted within the UK.

== Junctions ==
M90 motorway junctions
County	Location	mi	km	Junction	Destinations	Notes
Edinburgh	—	0	0	— (Note: 55.955°N 3.418°W)	M9 – Edinburgh, Stirling	
Edinburgh	Queensferry	2.6	4.1	1 (Note: 55.978°N 3.384°W)	A90 – Edinburgh	no Eastbound exit or Southbound entrance
Edinburgh	Queensferry	4.0	6.5	1a (Note: 55.984°N 3.422°W)	A904 – Queensferry, Newton	
Fife	Queensferry	6.7	10.8	1b Ferrytoll (Note: 56.021°N 3.407°W)	A9000 – Queensferry; B981- Inverkeithing, Rosyth Dockyard	
Fife	Rosyth	7.7	12.4	1c (Note: 56.036°N 3.408°W)	A985 – Rosyth, Kincardine; B921- Hillend, Kirkaldy	
Fife	Rosyth	8.2	13.2	2 (Note: 56.043°N 3.405°W)	A823(M)– Rosyth, Dunfermline	
Fife	Dunfermline	10.6	17.1	2a Crossgates (Note: 56.072°N 3.389°W)	A92 – Glenrothes	no Northbound entrance or Southbound exit
Fife	Dunfermline	11.3	18.2	3 Halbeath (Note: 56.081°N 3.397°W)	A92 – Glenrothes A907 - Dunfermline	
Fife	—	14.9	23.9	4 (Note: 56.129°N 3.394°W)	B914- Kelty	
Perth and Kinross	—	17.6	28.3	5 (Note: 56.167°N 3.404°W)	B9097- Crook of Devon	
Perth and Kinross	Kinross	20.7	33.3	6 (Note: 56.208°N 3.436°W)	A977 – Kinross, Crook of Devon	
Perth and Kinross	Kinross	21.9	35.2	7 (Note: 56.225°N 3.433°W)	A91 – Milnathort, Stirling	no Southbound entrance or Northbound exit
Perth and Kinross	Kinross	24.1	38.8	8 (Note: 56.239°N 3.391°W)	A91 – St Andrews	no Northbound entrance or Southbound exit
Perth and Kinross	Bridge of Earn	32.5	52.3	9 (Note: 56.342°N 3.397°W)	A912 – Bridge of Earn, Gateside	
Perth and Kinross	Bridge of Earn	34.7	55.8	10 (Note: 56.368°N 3.423°W)	A912 - Perth	Motorway splits into two, southbound entrance and Northbound exit only for A912
Perth and Kinross	Perth	36.0	58.0	11 (Note: 56.384°N 3.405°W)	A90 – Dundee; A85 – Perth, Oban	On the Eastern branch after the split
Perth and Kinross	Perth	37.5	60.4	12 (Note: 56.388°N 3.486°W)	A9 - Stirling, Inverness; A93 – perth	On the Western branch after the split
1.000 mi = 1.609 km; 1.000 km = 0.621 mi: Incomplete access

Coordinate list

== See also ==
- List of motorways in the United Kingdom
