= John Main (disambiguation) =

John Main (1926–1982) was a Roman Catholic priest. John Main may also refer to:

- John Main (minister) (1728–1795), Scottish minister
- John Main (politician) (born 1980), Canadian politician
- John F. Main (1864–1942), justice of the Washington Supreme Court

== See also ==
- John DeMain (fl. 1970s–2020s), American conductor
- John Maines (born 1948), musician, trombone player and active figure in the British brass band movement
