= Kate Downie =

United States-born Scottish artist

- Born: c. 1958 (age 67–68); North Carolina; United States

Kate Downie (born 1958) is a United States-born Scottish artist who works in painting, printmaking and drawing. She is known for her landscape painting, and her works are held by Glasgow's main public galleries.

Downie was born in North Carolina in 1958, to a Scottish father and English mother. She came to Scotland with her family when she was seven. She studied art in Aberdeen, and worked in several countries thereafter, including the United States and Holland, but is based in Edinburgh and known for her works portraying the Scottish landscape. Downie works in a range of media, including oil and acrylic painting, ink painting, collage, and lithography

From 2004 to 2006, Downie was President of the Society of Scottish Artists. In 2005 she was shortlisted for the Jerwood Drawing Prize. In the late 2000s, she created Coast Road Diaries, documenting a two-year journey around Scotland; the works formed a travelling exhibition that was critically acclaimed.

A member of the Royal Scottish Academy, in 2010 she travelled to China to study ink painting, returning in 2011 and again in 2013. Works resulting from these residencies were displayed at the Royal Scottish Academy and at the Royal Glasgow Institute's Kelly Gallery. In 2014, Downie was commissioned as an artist-in-residence at the Forth Road Bridge, to create an exhibition and work to commemorate the fiftieth anniversary of the bridge's construction. She described her role as conducting "an in-depth interview" with the structure, in order to gather the information and ideas to inform her work. She also climbed to the top of the structure, and spent two months working in an improvised studio directly under the bridge.

Described by journalist Jan Patience as "sure, deft and fearless", examples of Downie's art are held in the Glasgow Museums, including figurative works, such as 12 Minute Baby (1993) and urban landscapes such as Blue Night, Yellow Roof (1991).

In late September 2014 Downie set off for 3 months of travel in Australia and Japan, carrying out research of river systems, estuaries and bridges on the edge of the western Pacific Ocean. This culminated in a 2nd major solo exhibition with the Scottish Gallery Estuary in Edinburgh in April 2015. That same month also featured a two-person show ‘Drawing on the Landscape’ at Cobalt Contemporary in Pittenweem. Both shows were reviewed by the Times, The Scotsman and Studio International.
