= Martello Court =

Residential building in Edinburgh, Scotland

Coordinates: 55.972257°N 3.262799°W

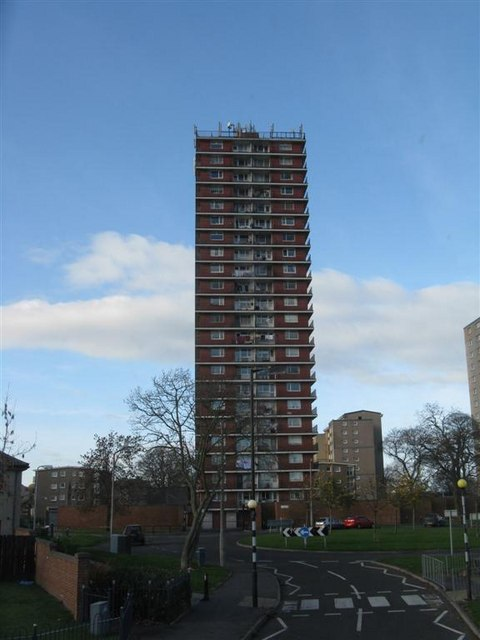
Martello Court

Martello Court is a residential building and one of the tallest buildings in Edinburgh, Scotland. It is 64 metres (210 ft) high, with 23 floors. It was known as the Terror Tower in the 1970s and 1980s because of the crime around it. It is on Pennywell Gardens in Muirhouse, in the north-west of the city.

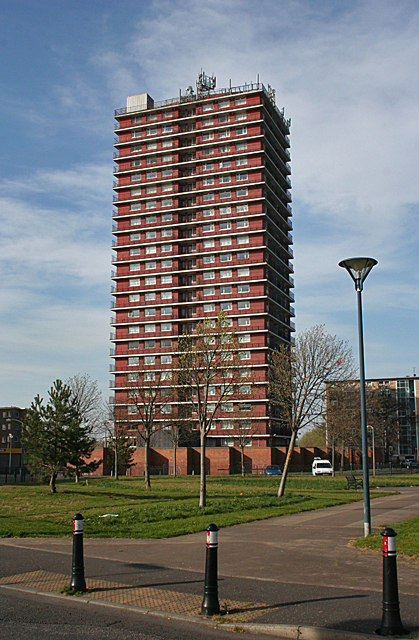
Martello Court in Muirhouse, Edinburgh

== See also ==
- List of tallest buildings and structures in Edinburgh
