= A823(M) motorway =

Road in Scotland

A823(M)
- A823(M) highlighted in blue
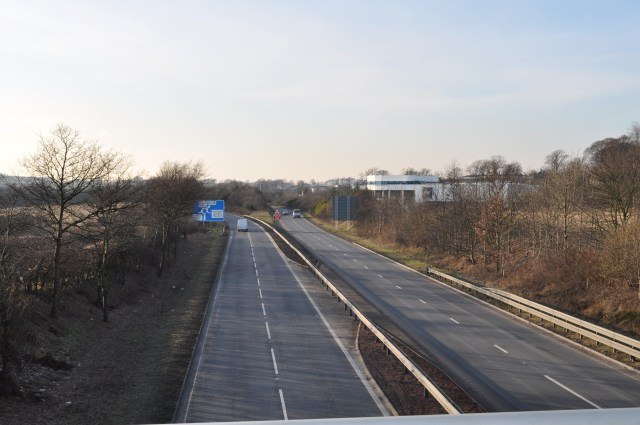
- Looking west towards the terminus

Route information
- Length: 1.0 mi (1.6 km)
- Existed: 1964–present

Major junctions
- West end: Rosyth
- M90 motorway
- East end: M90

Location
- Country: United Kingdom

Road network
- Roads in the United Kingdom; Motorways; A and B road zones

The A823(M) is a short motorway in Fife, Scotland. It is a 1-mile-long (1.6 km) spur from the M90 into Rosyth and the A823 towards Dunfermline.

The road provides a fast route for traffic between Rosyth and Dunfermline to or from the Queensferry Crossing and M90.

When it opened in 1964 it was intended to be part of a longer motorway continuing eastbound along to the north coast of the Firth of Forth and a bridge was built for this extension. Following the upgrade of the A92 it is unlikely this route will be constructed.

There is a footbridge over the middle of the motorway for pedestrians going between Rosyth and Dunfermline.

There is no hard-shoulder on the motorway but there is one emergency lay-by on each side of the road at the approximate middle of the motorway.

== Junctions ==
A823(M) motorway junctions
| Eastbound exits | Junction | Westbound exits |
|---|---|---|
| Aberdeen, Dundee, Perth, Edinburgh M90 | M90 J2 | Start of motorway |
| Start of motorway | | Dunfermline, Rosyth, Crieff A823 |

== See also ==
- List of motorways in the United Kingdom
