= Edinburgh Dynamos L.F.C. =

Scottish football club

The Edinburgh Dynamos Ladies Football Club was a leading association football team in Scotland.

The club was founded in the 1940s by Linda Clements and Mary Leslie, who had formerly played for the Edinburgh City Girls F.C. The Girls team disbanded soon afterwards, but the Dynamos survived until the mid-1950s.

The team was revived in the 1960s. In 1970, it was one of six founder members of the Scottish Women's Football Association, and it competed in the Scottish Women's Football League from its first season, winning the competition in 1975/76. It proved particularly successful in the Scottish Women's Cup, winning in 1972, 1974/75, 1975/76, and 1978/79. It also won the Scottish Women's Football League Cup in 1977.

Players from the team were prominent in the early Scotland women's national football team, and included Sheila Begbie, who captained it in its first ever match, against England.

In the 1980s, the team was less successful, losing in the Women's Cup final in 1980/81 and 1984/85. It continued playing in the top division until the end of the 1988/1989 season, after which it withdrew from the league.
