= Sheila Begbie =

Scottish footballer and sports administrator

Sheila Margaret Begbie MBE (born 1957) is a Scottish former footballer and sports administrator who was Director of Domestic Rugby at the Scottish Rugby Union (SRU) until 2021. She played as a central defender for Edinburgh Dynamos and the Scotland women's national team, making 25 international appearances after debuting for Scotland aged 15. She later entered football administration, spending sixteen years as head of Girls' and Women's Football at the Scottish Football Association (SFA) before switching to rugby union with the SRU in 2014.

== Early life and football career ==
Sheila Begbie grew up in the Drylaw area of Edinburgh and attended Craigroyston High School in the early 1970s. She began playing football and other sports in the street, in an era when this was considered unusual for a girl. At the age of 13, she heard about a local women's football team, Edinburgh Dynamos – one of only eight such teams in Scotland at the time – and began to play in organised football.

Aged 15, she made her debut for the Scotland national team in 1973, going on to make 25 appearances as a defender. Her first appearance was in an 8–0 defeat against England in Nuneaton, but she captained Scotland in their first ever win against England, 2–1 in Dundee in 1977. She scored for Scotland and also conceded an own goal in a 3–1 defeat to Italy at the San Siro in September 1974.

Although she was later offered opportunities to play semi-professionally in Italy and the United States, Begbie decided to stay in Scotland and concentrate on her career as a physical education teacher. In 1995, she became one of the first Scottish women to obtain an A Licence for coaching.

== Administrative career ==
Begbie was Girls' and Women's Football Co-ordinator with the TeamSport Scotland initiative of Sportscotland prior to becoming Head of Girls' and Women's Football at the Scottish Football Association (SFA) in 1998. She was involved in the establishment of the SFA Women's National Performance Centre at the University of Stirling. She also worked with UEFA in a number of roles, including as head of their Women's Committee and as a Match Delegate.

Begbie left the SFA in 2014, switching sports to take up a new appointment with the Scottish Rugby Union (SRU) as Head of Women's Rugby. In 2017 she took up a new role at the SRU, becoming Director of Domestic Rugby, with a remit to develop the sport at grassroots level. She will retire from the SRU in the summer of 2021.

== Honours ==
Begbie was appointed a Member of the Order of the British Empire (MBE) in the 2001 New Year Honours list, for services to women's football.
