= Forth Estuary Transport Authority =

Scottish government agency, 2001–2015

The Forth Estuary Transport Authority (FETA) was the authority responsible for the maintenance of the Forth Road Bridge over the Firth of Forth in eastern central Scotland. FETA was created in 2001 by the Transport (Scotland) Act 2001 (asp 2) to replace the Forth Road Bridge Joint Board.

== Remit ==
Forth Estuary Transport Authority Order 2002
- Statutory Instrument
- Scottish Parliament
- Citation: SSI 2002/178

Dates
- Made: 28 March 2002
- Commencement: 1 April 2002

Other legislation
- Made under: Transport (Scotland) Act 2001

Text of statute as originally enacted

The Forth Estuary Transport Authority was formed in 2001, with a wider remit than the Forth Road Bridge Joint Board it replaced. It was able to fund road and public transport improvements to aide crossing the Firth of Forth, and its new powers permitted it to include the use of routes other than the Forth Road Bridge, such as using the Firth of Forth itself for hovercraft services between Fife and Lothian.

== Organisation ==
The board of FETA had ten members, allocated as follows:

- four to the City of Edinburgh
- four to Fife Council
- one to the Perth and Kinross Council
- one to West Lothian Council

== History of significant operations ==
The Forth Road Bridge underwent a comprehensive structural survey between 2003 and 2005 after suspension bridges of similar design and age in the United States were found to be suffering from corrosion in their main suspension cables. The survey results showed significant corrosion and an accompanying loss in strength of between 8 and 10% in the cables on the Forth Bridge.

The rate of corrosion and weakening of the main cables would have required the bridge to close to HGV traffic some time around 2014 and then close to all traffic by 2019, so plans were drawn up to build a replacement crossing, to run parallel to the existing road bridge between Lothian and Fife. Dehumidification equipment was installed to remove moisture from the inside of the main suspension cables, in an attempt to slow or halt the corrosion, but with no guarantee of success, the Forth Estuary Transport Authority and Scottish Government were left with no option but to plan the construction of a new crossing.

Dehumidification work on the Forth Road Bridge was successful in halting the corrosion of the main cables, so there is now no requirement to close the existing Forth Road Bridge to traffic. The Forth Road Bridge will, as a result, be incorporated into the road network alongside the new bridge, the Queensferry Crossing, and will provide a dedicated public transport crossing, remaining available as a diversionary route in the event the new bridge has to be closed.

== Closure ==
The Scottish Government put out to tender a contract for the operation and maintenance of the existing road bridge and new Queensferry Crossing (the rail bridge remaining under the ownership and control of Network Rail). The successful bidder was Amey plc who would take over maintenance work in 2015.

The Forth Bridges Operating Company (the legal title for the incoming private operator) inherited staff from the Forth Estuary Transport Authority, and transferred over under the Transfer of Undertakings (Protection of Employment) Regulations 2006. The Forth Bridges Operating Company will then be responsible for the maintenance of the Forth Road Bridge, the Queensferry Crossing and the approach roads to the north and south; the M90 from Junction 3, Halbeath, through to Junction 1A, Kirkliston.

The Forth Estuary Transport Authority was disbanded on 31 May 2015.
