= Craigroyston Community High School =

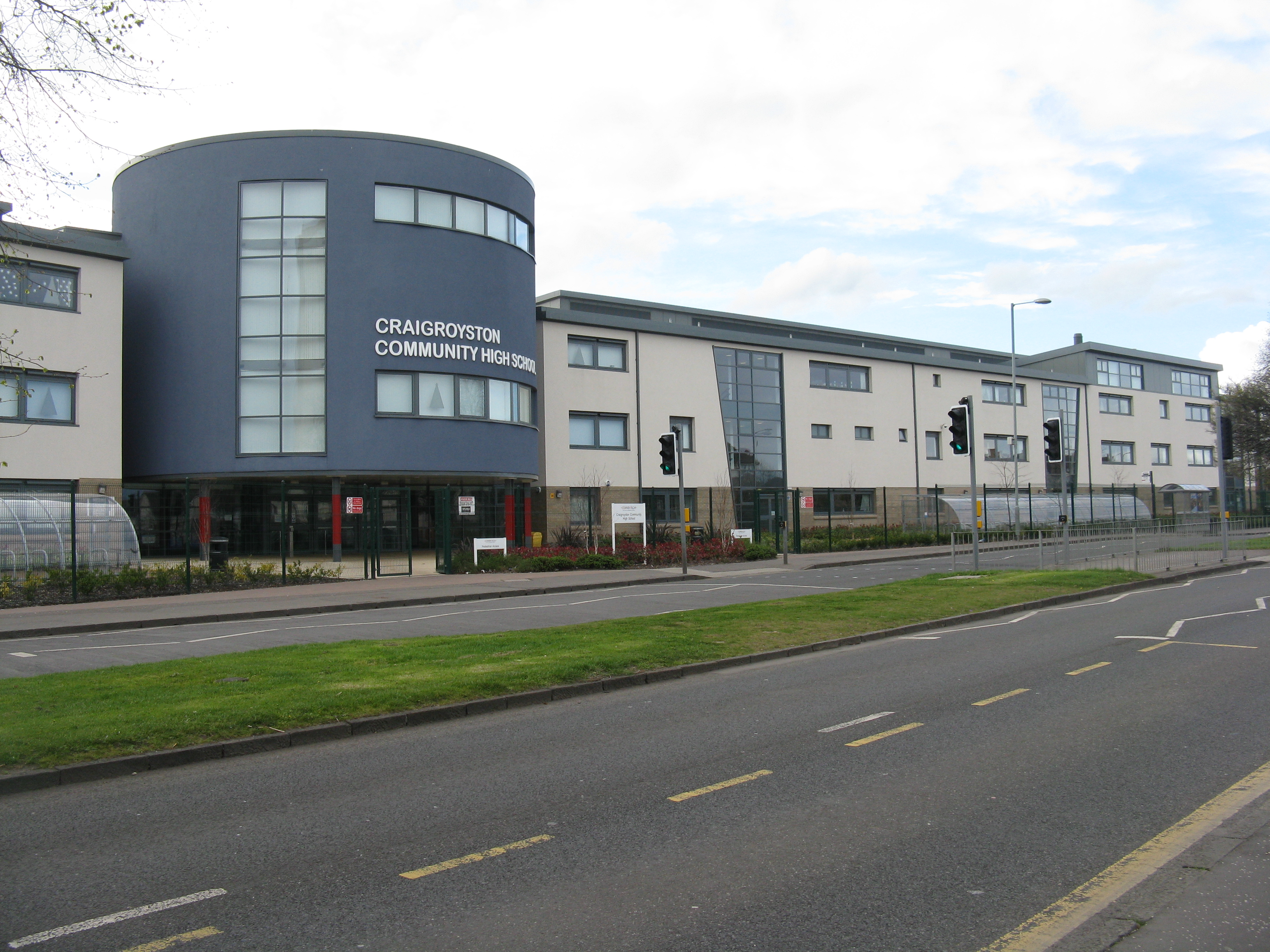

Location
- Pennywell Road; Edinburgh, EH4 4NL; Scotland; 55°58′24.8″N 3°15′13.71″W

Information
- Established: 1963
- Age: 11 to 18
- Enrolment: 735
- Houses: Original - Nealon, Williamson, MacDonald. Current - Bute, Arran, Mull, Skye
- Colours: Blue, yellow, white and black
- Website: craigroystonchs.co.uk

Craigroyston Community High School is a non-denominational and non expulsion community secondary school in Muirhouse, Edinburgh.

The current headteacher is Stephen Kelly.

== History ==
Plans for Craigroyston High School were originally drawn up in 1959, by architects Mottram, Patrick & Dalgleish. with construction commencing in 1960. The school was officially opened on 16 October 1963, by the Lord Provost of the City of Edinburgh, Duncan M. Weatherstone. The school houses were named, Nealon, Williamson and MacDonald, after local councillors. The original Craigroyston High School was closed in the late 2000s, as part of the City of Edinburgh Council's Pennywell and Muirhouse area regeneration project.

As an initial part of the regeneration project the new Craigroyston Community High School building was constructed at an adjacent site, further north along Pennywell Road, and was opened in 2010 by Sir Tom Farmer. The original school building was extensively damaged by a fire on 22 July 2010, but has also been affected by other smaller fires and severe vandalism in the period after the old campus closing and the new campus opening but shortly after the main fire from July 22 2010, the old buildings demolition started that same day

Hugh MacKenzie was headteacher of Craigroyston High School from 1972 to 1993. MacKenzie was recognised as an innovative and radical educationalist, who played a key role in introducing comprehensive education in Edinburgh. Amongst many initiatives, he led the school to be formally recognised as a Community High School in 1985. After retirement MacKenzie wrote a book about his time at the school, Craigroyston Days : The story of an educational revolution published in 1995. MacKenzie died on 17 March 2020.

== Notable alumni ==
- Sheila Begbie – Director of Domestic Rugby at the Scottish Rugby Union and former footballer
- Gordon Strachan O.B.E - Football coach, manager and former player.
