= Newton, West Lothian =

Coordinates: 55.983°N 3.457°W

Newton: Scottish Gaelic: Baile Ur; Scots: Nitten/Newtoun
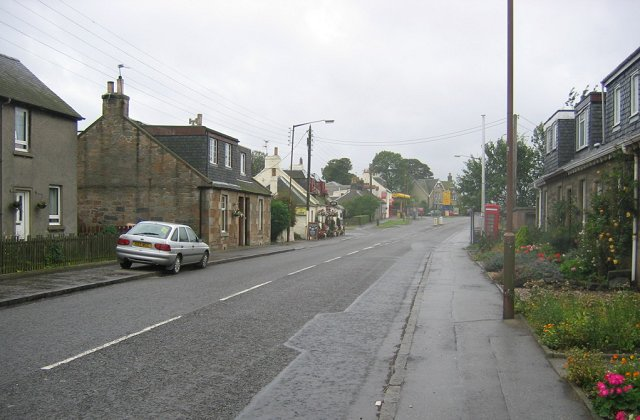
- The A904 through Newton

- Location within West Lothian
- OS grid reference: NT091775
- Civil parish: Abercorn
- Council area: West Lothian
- Lieutenancy area: West Lothian
- Country: Scotland
- Sovereign state: United Kingdom
- Post town: BROXBURN
- Postcode district: EH52
- Dialling code: 0131
- Police: Scotland
- Fire: Scottish
- Ambulance: Scottish
- UK Parliament: Bathgate and Linlithgow
- Scottish Parliament: Linlithgow

Newton or (The Newton) is a small village in the county of West Lothian, Scotland. It lies on the A904 trunk road 2.6 miles (4.2 km) west of South Queensferry and the Forth Road Bridge and 6 miles (9.7 km) east of Linlithgow.

In 1846, it had 250 inhabitants and was known for its limestone quarry.

All road traffic travelling west from the Forth Road Bridge currently has to pass through the village in order to gain access to the M9 Motorway although this was set to change under proposals to upgrade M9 Junction 1a as part of the Forth Replacement Crossing scheme by 2013.

The village's location serves it well as a commuter village for those who travel daily to Edinburgh and Fife. It currently hosts a petrol service station, a small shop and a pub. There is a community hall on Duddingston Crescent.

== Notable residents ==
- Rev John Main DD FRSE (1728-1795) joint founder of the Royal Society of Edinburgh was minister of Newton
