= Queensferry Crossing =

Road bridge across the Firth of Forth, Scotland

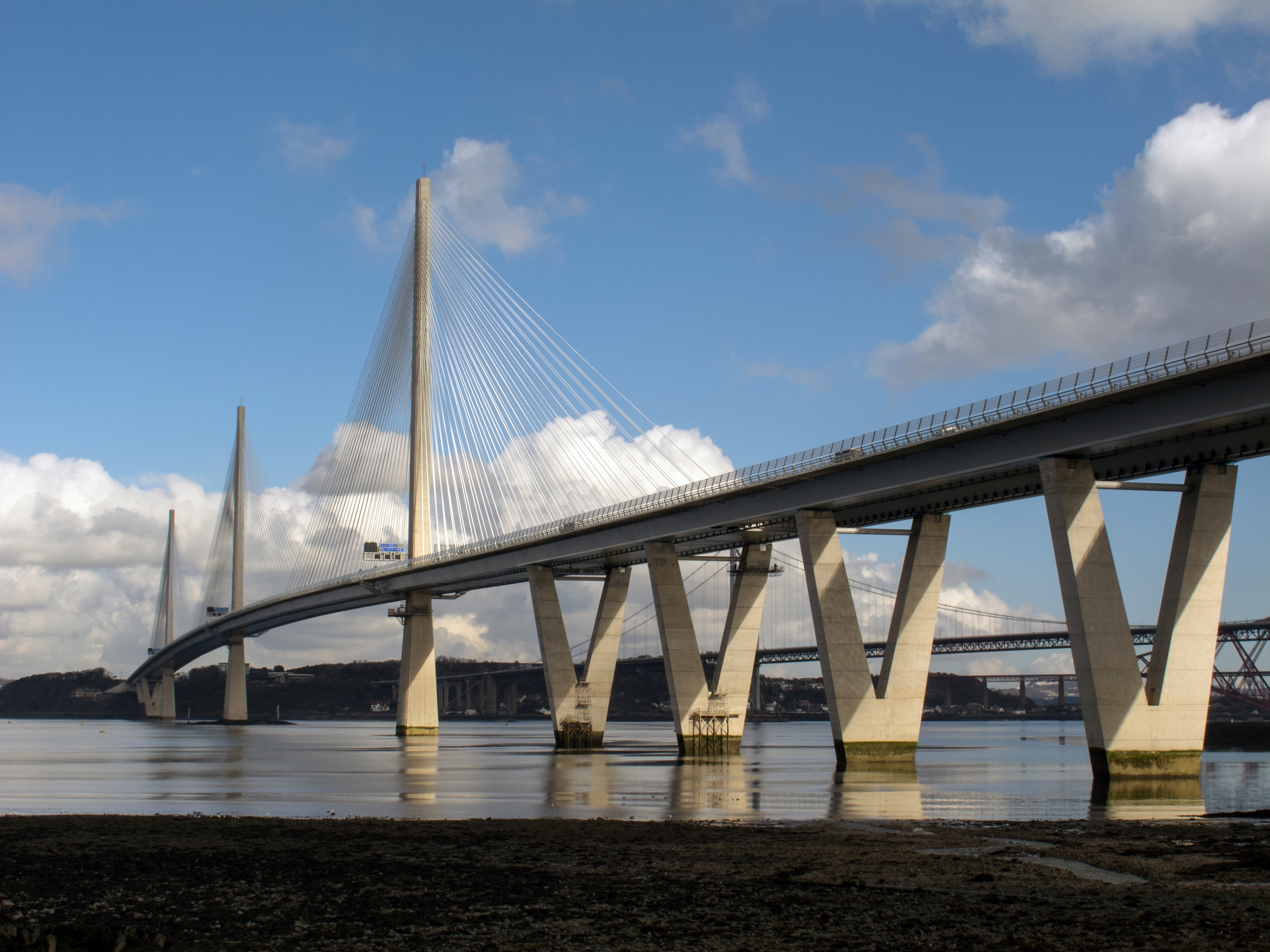
- The Queensferry Crossing from the South End, 2018
- Coordinates: 56.0046°N 3.4124°W
- Carries: M90
- Crosses: Firth of Forth
- Locale: Edinburgh; Fife
- Maintained by: Transport Scotland
- Preceded by: Kincardine Bridge
- Followed by: Forth Road Bridge

Characteristics
- Design: Cable-stayed bridge
- Total length: 2,700 metres (8,858 ft)
- Height: 207 metres (679 ft)
- Longest span: 650 metres (2,133 ft)
- No. of lanes: Dual two-lane carriageway with hard shoulders

History
- Designer: Forth Crossing Bridge Constructors (FCBC)
- Construction start: September 2011
- Construction end: 27 August 2017
- Construction cost: £1.35 billion
- Opened: 30 August 2017
- Inaugurated: 4 September 2017

Location
- Interactive map of Queensferry Crossing

Forth Crossing Act 2011
- Act of the Scottish Parliament
- Scottish Parliament
- Long title: An Act of the Scottish Parliament to give the Scottish Ministers power to construct a new bridge over the Firth of Forth and to construct and improve associated roads and structures; to authorise the acquisition, or temporary possession and use, of land for construction and improvement works; and for connected purposes.
- Citation: 2011 asp 2

Dates
- Royal assent: 20 January 2011
- Commencement: 20 January 2011

Status: Current legislation

Text of statute as originally enacted

Text of the Forth Crossing Act 2011 as in force today (including any amendments) within the United Kingdom, from legislation.gov.uk.

The Queensferry Crossing (formerly the Forth Replacement Crossing) is a road bridge in Scotland. It was built alongside the existing Forth Road Bridge and the Forth Bridge. It carries the M90 motorway across the Firth of Forth between Edinburgh, at South Queensferry, and Fife, at North Queensferry.

Proposals for a second Forth Road crossing, to meet unexpected demand, were first put forward in the 1990s, but no action was taken until structural issues were discovered in the Forth Road Bridge in 2004. In 2006–07 Transport Scotland carried out a study, and in December 2007 decided to proceed with a replacement bridge. The following year it was announced that the existing bridge would be retained as a public transport link. The Forth Crossing Act 2011 (asp 2) received royal assent on 20 January 2011. In April 2011, the Forth Crossing Bridge Constructors consortium was awarded the contract, and construction began in late summer/autumn of 2011.

The Queensferry Crossing is a three-tower cable-stayed bridge, with an overall length of 1.7 miles (2.7 kilometres). Around 2.5 miles (4 kilometres) of new connecting roads were built, including new and upgraded junctions at Ferrytoll in Fife, South Queensferry and Junction 1A on the M9.

The bridge was first due to be completed by December 2016, but this deadline was extended to August 2017 after several delays. It is the third bridge across the Forth at Queensferry, alongside the Forth Road Bridge completed in 1964, and the Forth Rail Bridge completed in 1890. Following a public vote, it was formally named on 26 June 2013 and opened to traffic on 30 August 2017. The bridge was formally opened on 4 September 2017 by Queen Elizabeth II, fifty-three years to the day after she opened the adjacent Forth Road Bridge.

== Background ==
A crossing route over the Forth had existed at the site since the 11th century, when the Queen of Scotland, Margaret, founded a free ferry to take pilgrims north to St Andrews. The site of the ferry crossing became the location of the Forth Road Bridge, which opened on 4 September 1964. Proposals for an additional road crossing at Queensferry were drawn up in the early-1990s, as part of the "Setting Forth" consultation document prepared by the Scottish Office. The plans met stiff opposition from environmentalists and from the City of Edinburgh Council on the grounds of increased traffic. Following the Labour victory at the 1997 general election, the proposals were shelved.

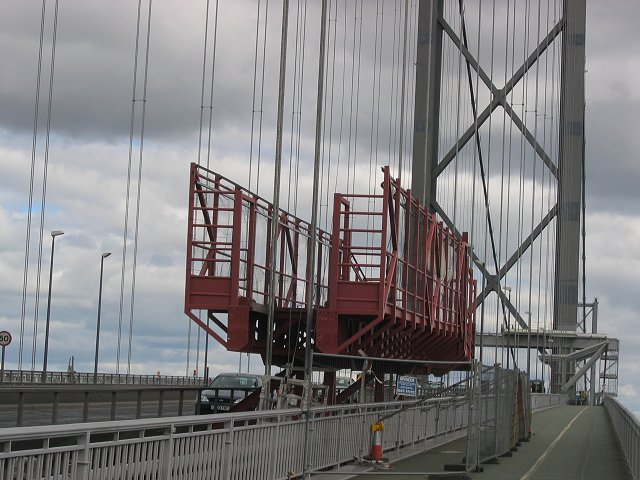
An inspection of the integrity of the cables under way on the Forth Road Bridge

The existing bridge had a planned design life of 120 years, but by the early-2000s, the planned theoretical capacity for the bridge was being routinely exceeded. It was designed for up to 11 million vehicles per year, but this had risen steadily to 23 million vehicles in 2006. Between 2003 and 2005, an inspection programme found that the main suspension cables had suffered an estimated 8–10% loss of strength as a result of corrosion. Projections highlighted the likelihood of an accelerating loss of strength, with traffic restrictions to limit loading required in 2014 in the worst-case scenario. In 2006–07, Transport Scotland carried out a study to examine the options and in December 2007, the decision was made to proceed with a replacement bridge.

The strategic transport importance of the road bridge, and the threat of closure by 2019 if major structural work was not successful, led to fears of serious economic consequences, especially as work on a new crossing was estimated to take up to eleven years. Scottish Transport Minister Nicol Stephen commissioned a new study, which priced a second Forth Road Bridge at £300 million in 2003. The Forth Estuary Transport Authority voiced support for a new bridge in 2005, and in 2006 the UK Transport Secretary, Alistair Darling, spoke in favour of the idea.

== Planning ==
In 2007, the Forth Replacement Crossing Study was commissioned by Transport Scotland to examine various options for new bridges or tunnels across the Forth. The report recommended adoption of a cable-stayed bridge, located to the west of the Forth Road Bridge, as the preferred solution. The study concluded that this option was significantly cheaper than a tunnel, would take less time to construct, and would represent better value for money; though it was noted that a tunnel would have an advantage of less impact on the environment. In December 2007, Finance Secretary John Swinney announced that a new cable-stayed bridge would be constructed, with an estimated cost of between £3.25 billion-£4.22 billion. He claimed it would be "the largest construction project in a generation in Scotland".

There was opposition to the project on environmental, traffic and cost grounds. The ForthRight Alliance, an umbrella group including Friends of the Earth, the Scottish Green Party, the RSPB, sustainable transport groups and other local organisations, opposed the scheme since 1994, and presented arguments that the Forth Road crossing could be repaired and maintained. Another group, Forth Tunnel Action Group, campaigned for a tunnel as the solution with lowest costs and fewest long-term environmental impacts.

It was initially suggested that the new bridge would be funded via the Scottish Futures Trust, an alternative to public-private partnership funding for major public-sector schemes. However, the Scottish Government announced in December 2008 that public funding would be used. As part of the Scottish Government's Strategic Transport Projects Review, the new Forth crossing was priced at between £1.72 billion-£2.34 billion. Under the revised scheme, the existing bridge will be retained for public transport, cyclists and pedestrians, and the new bridge was to be operational by 2016.

A joint venture between consultancies Arup and Jacobs was appointed as project manager, and in February 2008, environmental and technical studies began; continuing throughout 2009. Public consultations were held, and some changes to the scheme were made in response to the comments received. An environmental statement was published in November 2009, coinciding with the introduction of the Forth Crossing Bill into the Scottish Parliament by John Swinney. A majority of MSPs voted in favour of the new legislation on 16 December 2010, and the Forth Crossing Act 2011 received royal assent in January 2011.

=== Bidding process ===
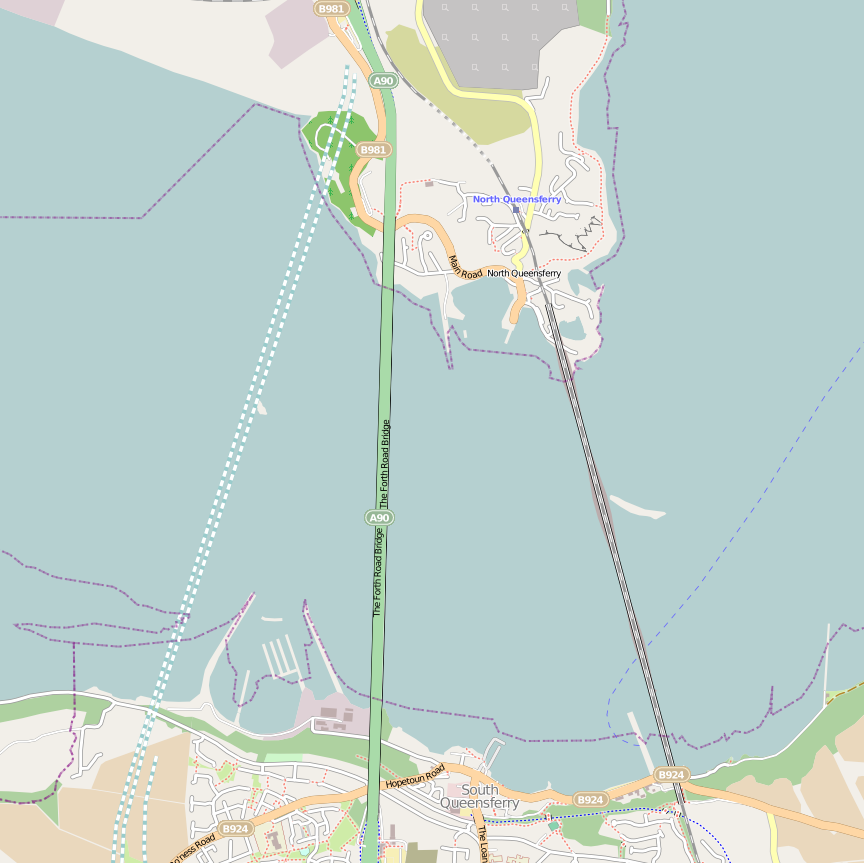
The Queensferry Crossing (left) in relation to the Forth Road Bridge (centre) and the Forth Bridge (right)

In 2009, Transport Scotland solicited for tenders to construct the proposed bridge. Although Transport Scotland received 39 expressions of interest, concerns over the risks associated with the fixed-price contract resulted in only two consortia of large construction companies bidding. Due to the bidders' concerns that the bidding process itself would prove to be an expensive proposition, the Scottish Government allocated £10 million to defray the bidders' costs during the full bidding process, should the project be abandoned.

The two consortia were Forthspan, which included Morgan Sindall, BAM Nuttall and Balfour Beatty; and Forth Crossing Bridge Constructors (FCBC), which consists of Dragados, Hochtief, American Bridge, and Morrison Construction. Bids for the main contract, priced at between £900 million-£1.2 billion and including design and construction of the bridge and approach roads, were submitted in January 2011. In March 2011 the Scottish Government announced FCBC as preferred bidder, with a bid of £790 million. Ramboll is leading the Design Joint Venture which includes Sweco and Leonhardt Andra and Partners.

In addition to the main contract, two smaller contracts form part of the scheme. The contract to implement the Intelligent Transport System (ITS) traffic management system in Fife was awarded to John Graham (Dromore) Ltd, with a tender of £12.9 million, while the upgrade of M9 Junction 1a was awarded to a joint venture between John Sisk and Roadbridge, with a tender of £25.6 million. As with the main contract, the tenders received were below the original estimated budgets. Naeem Hussain, Global Bridge Design Practice Leader at Arup, was the lead design engineer for the project.

== Construction ==
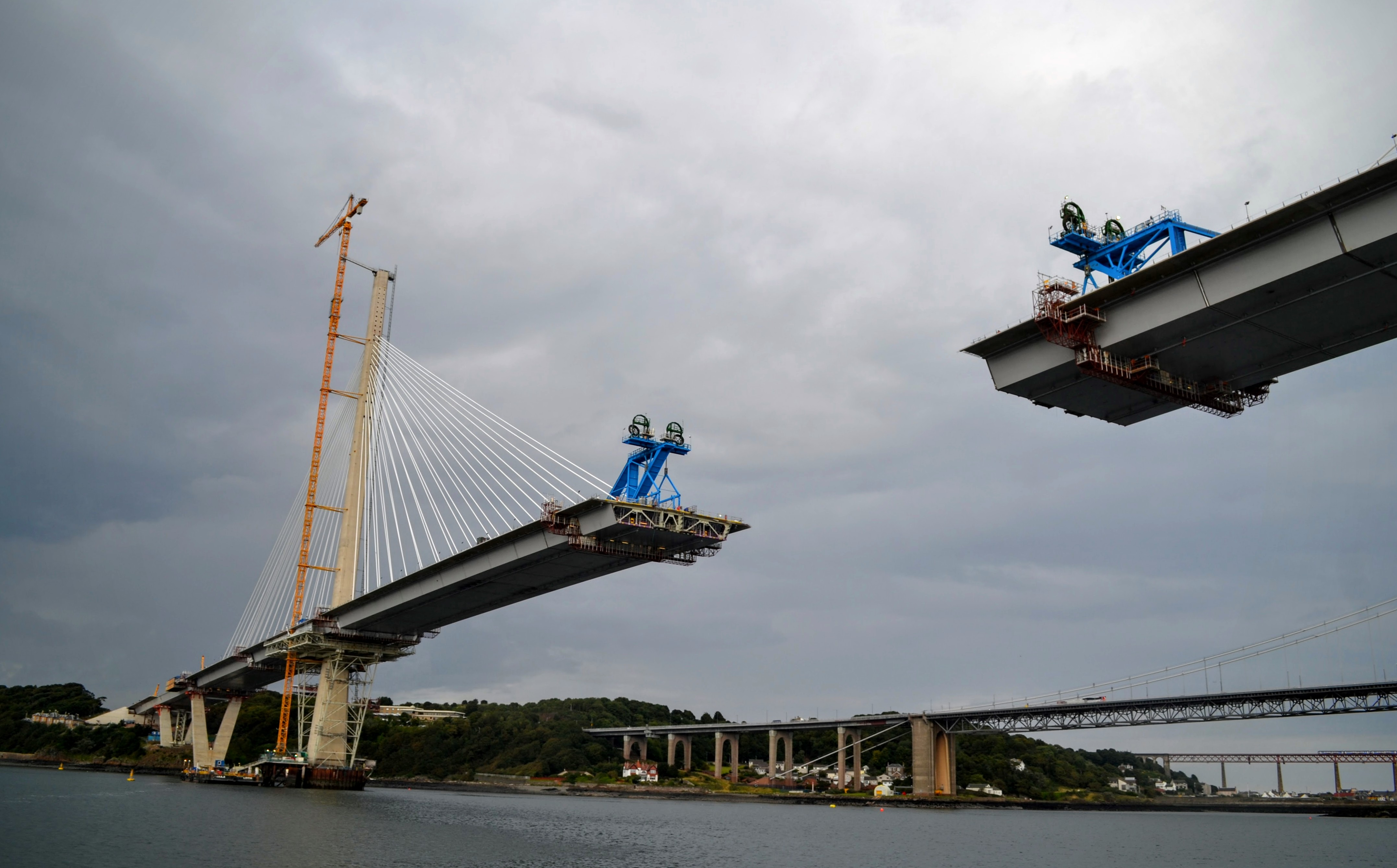
Queensferry Crossing under construction in August 2016

Preparatory works for the new bridge began in September 2011 with works beginning at the southern end of the M90 to build the northern approach roads. 149 segments of bridge deck, each of which is 12 metres (39 ft) long and 40 metres (130 ft) wide, were constructed in China and Spain, then delivered by sea in October 2013. The approach steel bridge sections were manufactured by Cleveland Bridge & Engineering Company in Darlington.

The towers reached 160 metres (525 ft) in height in August 2015, making it the UK's tallest bridge. The completed towers stand at 207 metres (679 ft).

On 28 April 2016, one construction worker was killed and another injured in an accident involving a crane. Work on the bridge was halted to allow an investigation to take place.

The bridge was due to be completed by December 2016, but that date was put back to May 2017 due to weather delays slowing construction, with 25 days lost due to high winds during April and May 2016. An additional delay was announced in March 2017 as a result of high winds, making work on the structure difficult and unsafe for workers. The opening of the bridge was pushed back to the summer of 2017 as a result of "adverse weather conditions" delaying work on the bridge.

The bridge opened on 30 August 2017 and was formally opened by Queen Elizabeth II on 4 September 2017.

== The bridge ==
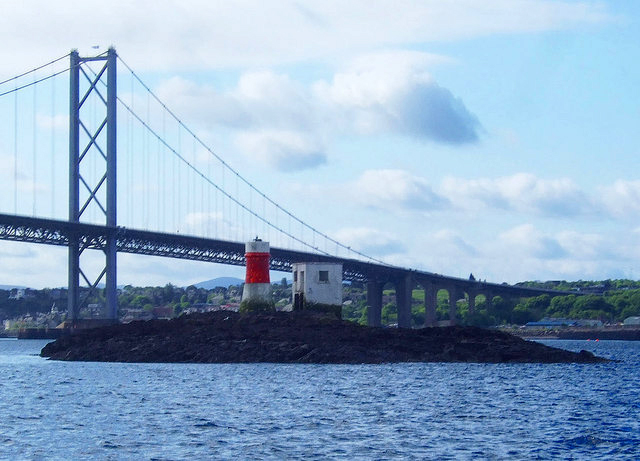
The Beamer Rock, prior to removal of the lighthouse to make way for the bridge

The bridge is a cable-stayed structure, with three towers each 207 metres (679 ft) high. Including approaches, the overall length of the bridge is 1.7 miles (2.7 kilometres); at opening, it was the longest triple tower cable-stayed bridge in the world. The bridge carries motorcycles, cars and heavy goods vehicles, while public transport, cyclists and pedestrians use the Forth Road Bridge. Wind shielding has been built into the design, to enable use of the bridge in high winds, which often led to restrictions on the old bridge. The bridge was closed for the first time on 11 February 2020, 30 months after opening, due to accumulations of ice on the towers. Some of the ice then fell onto the carriageway, which damaged eight vehicles and prompted the closure.

The bridge is the third crossing of the Forth at Queensferry, alongside the Forth Road Bridge, completed in 1964, and the Forth Bridge, a railway bridge completed in 1890. It is sited west of the road bridge, with the northern landfall at St Margaret's Hope, between Rosyth Dockyard and North Queensferry and the southern landfall just west of Port Edgar in South Queensferry. The central tower was constructed on the Beamer Rock, a small islet in the Forth.

The project was known as the Forth Replacement Crossing, and a name for the new bridge was selected in a public vote in 2013 after a panel of independent advisers provided a shortlist of possible names. Five names were shortlisted: Caledonia Bridge, Firth of Forth Crossing, Queensferry Crossing, Saltire Crossing and St Margaret's Crossing. A public vote was held up until 7 June 2013 and the name Queensferry Crossing received the most votes: 12,039 out of 37,000 (32%).

== Connecting roads ==
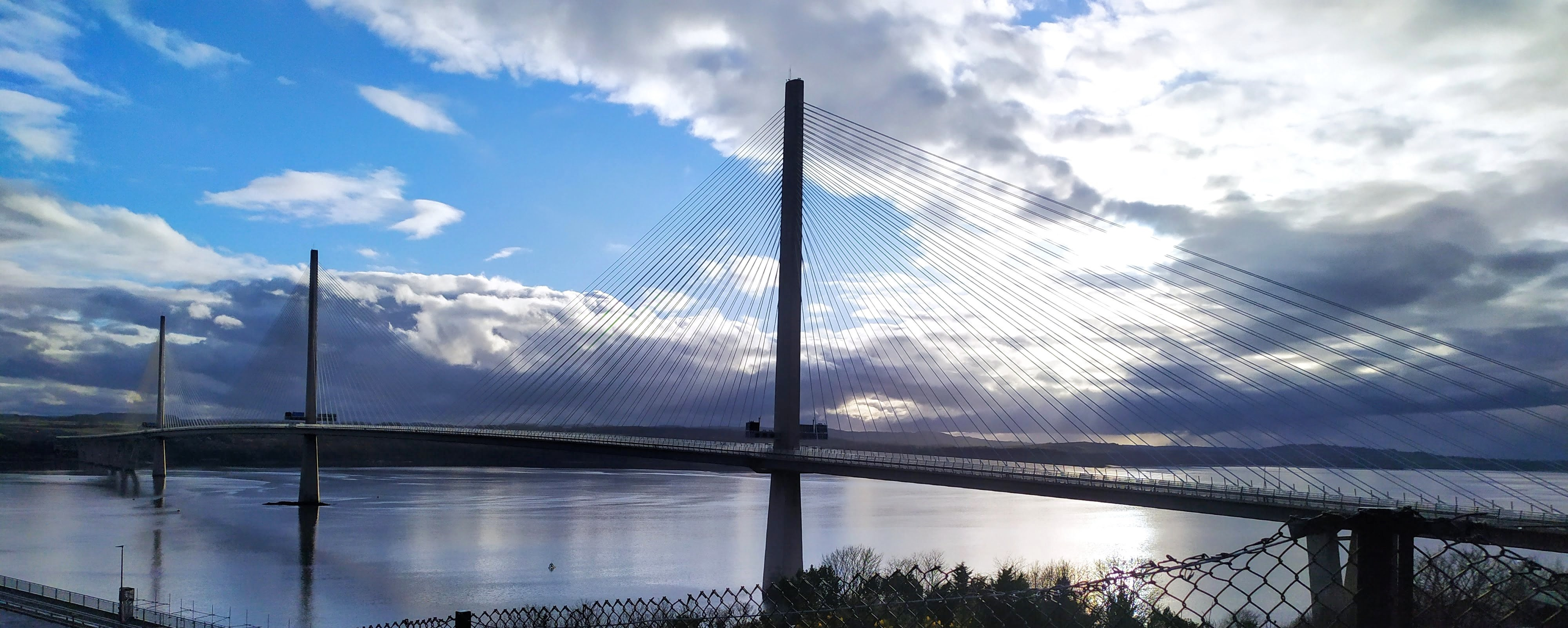
The Queensferry Crossing in 2024

Several new and upgraded roads connect the bridge into the existing road network with around 2.5 miles (4 kilometres) of new roads constructed. These new roads join the M9 and M90 motorways together for the first time, with the Queensferry Crossing being built to motorway standard in order to carry the M90 across the Forth. The M90 motorway previously terminated at Admiralty Junction, around 1.9 miles (3 kilometres) north of the current Forth Road Bridge, with the road continuing as all-purpose dual carriageway across the existing bridge and joining the M9 via the M9 Spur.

=== Admiralty ===
Admiralty Junction, previously Junction 1 of the M90 motorway remains unaltered, with the exception of a bus lane added on the southbound carriageway. The junction was renumbered to Junction 1C of the M90 when the Queensferry Crossing opened.

=== Ferrytoll Junction ===
Ferrytoll Junction was redesigned to give access to the new crossing and to maintain public transport access to the Forth Road Bridge. The design of the new junction required the realignment of the B981 road to North Queensferry. Ferrytoll Junction was numbered Junction 1B of the M90 following completion of the Queensferry Crossing.

=== South Queensferry Junction ===
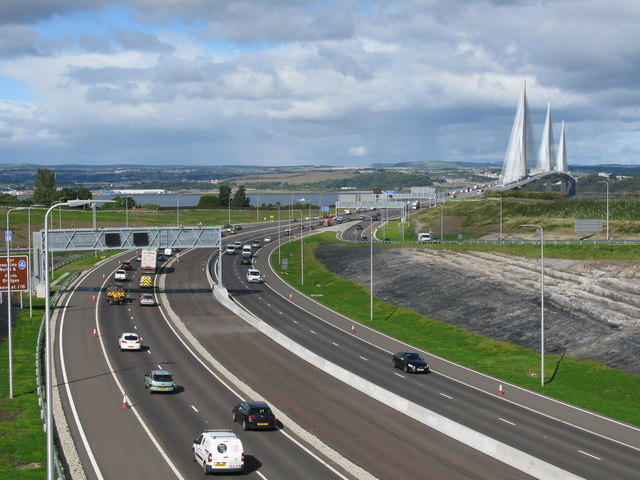
The Southern Approach to the M90 towards the Queensferry Crossing

The M90 was extended west from the existing bridge access at Ferry Muir, wrapping around South Queensferry to the southern landfall of the new crossing. A grade-separated junction was built on the A904 just west of Echline, at the south-west edge. The existing access from the Forth Road Bridge to the A90 remains open to public transport. South Queensferry Junction became Junction 1A of the M90 when the Queensferry Crossing opened.

=== M9 Junction 1a ===
Junction 1a provides access from the M9 to the Forth Road Bridge and Queensferry Crossing via the M9 Spur, which was renumbered as M90 upon completion of the Queensferry Crossing. Originally, only east-facing connections were provided to the M9, forcing traffic heading west from the bridge onto the A904 through the village of Newton in West Lothian. The upgrade of the junction included new west-facing slip roads, enabling direct access onto the M9 from the Forth Road Bridge and the new crossing, as well as the widening of the existing connections to assist the flow of traffic at peak times. The improvements were completed in February 2013 at a cost of £25.6m. The junction connecting the A90 / M90 at the southern end of the bridges with the A90 towards Edinburgh city centre and the M90 extension is named the Scotstoun Junction and is numbered as Junction 1 of the M90.

=== Intelligent Transport System ===
An "Intelligent transportation system" (ITS) was installed between Halbeath on the M90, and the M9, covering the whole scheme. The ITS is an active traffic management, enabling variable speed restrictions and lane closures to be displayed on overhead gantries.

== Archaeological finds ==
During routine archaeological excavations by Headland Archaeology in advance of work on the new bridge, archaeological deposits from the Mesolithic were found on both sides of the Forth.

On the northern side two post-built structures and their surrounding pits were found, and dated to the mid to late Mesolithic period.

On the south bank in a field at Echline the remnants of a sunken floor structure with in situ floor deposits were found. The structure, based around an oval pit approximately 7 metres (23 ft) in length, contained the remains of a hearth, stone tools, and bone from a variety of animals. Radiocarbon analysis gave a date of c.8300, about 1000 years older than the northern site, making it the earliest known dwelling in Scotland. Additionally three isolated Neolithic pits and a Bronze Age pit group and pit alignment were identified.

== See also ==
- Bridges in Scotland
- List of tallest buildings and structures in Edinburgh
