= Forth Road Bridge =

Suspension bridge spanning the Firth of Forth in east-central Scotland

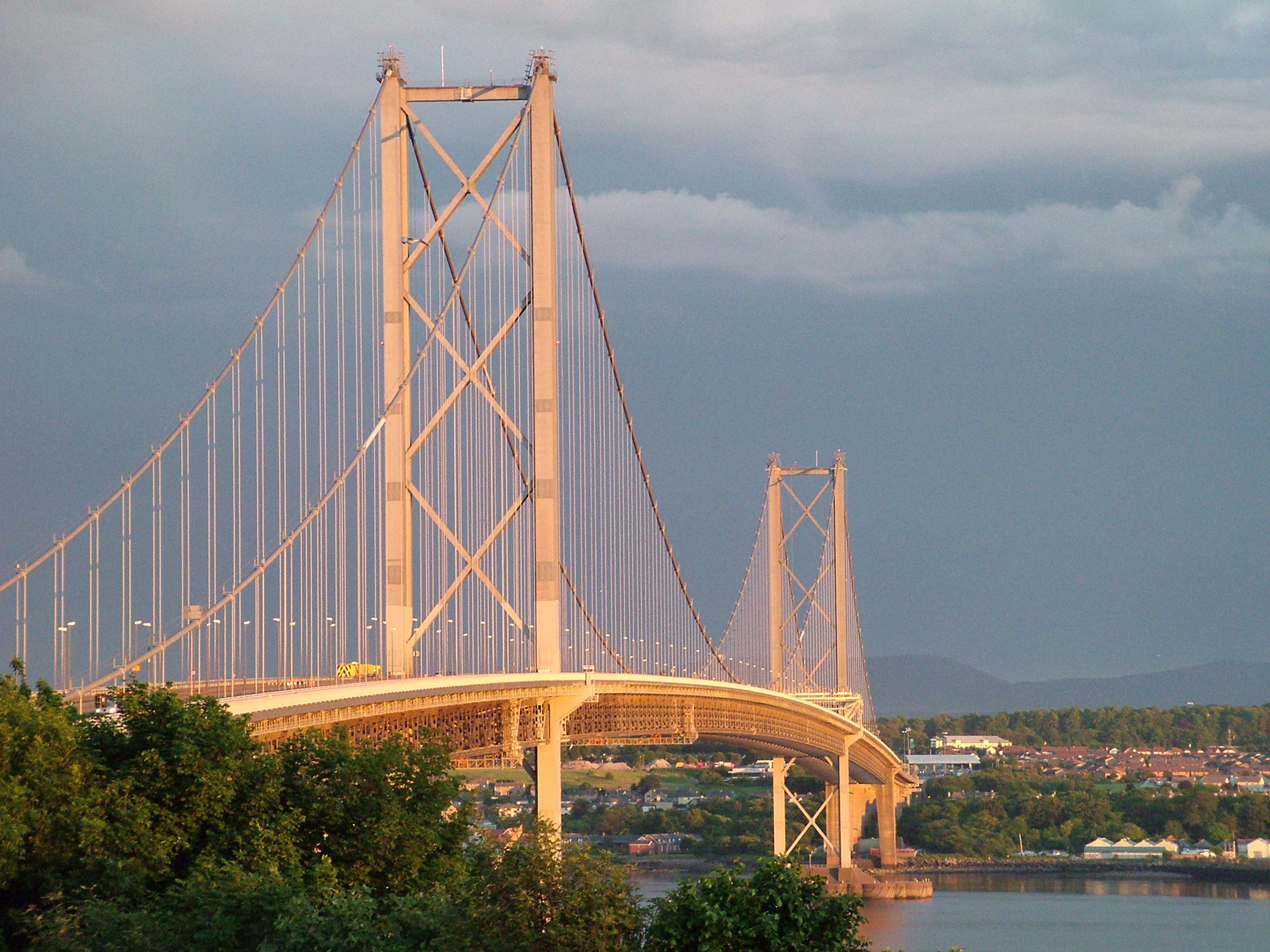
- View from South Queensferry towards Fife, 2006
- Coordinates: 56.00168°N 3.40406°W
- OS grid reference: NT 12535 79638
- Carries: Motor vehicles A9000 (Note: Motor vehicle access is now restricted as the bridge has been designated as a dedicated Public Transport Corridor. The only vehicles allowed to use the crossing are buses, taxis, agricultural vehicles banned from the Queensferry Crossing, emergency vehicles, learner driver motorcycles more than 125cc, and all motorcycles up to 125cc.); Cyclists 1; Pedestrians
- Crosses: Firth of Forth
- Locale: Edinburgh; Fife
- Named for: River Forth
- Maintained by: Transport Scotland
- Preceded by: Queensferry Crossing
- Followed by: Forth Bridge

Characteristics
- Design: Suspension bridge
- Material: Steel
- Total length: 2,512 m (8,241 ft)
- Width: 33 m (108 ft) dual two-lane carriageway, two cycle/footpaths
- Height: 156 m (512 ft)
- Longest span: 1,006 m (3,301 ft)

History
- Designer: Sir William Arrol & Co.; Cleveland Bridge & Engineering Company; Dorman Long
- Opened: 4 September 1964

Listed Building – Category A
- Official name: Forth Road Bridge With Approach Ramps And Piers
- Designated: 21 March 2001
- Reference no.: LB47778

Location
- Interactive map of Forth Road Bridge

The Forth Road Bridge is a suspension bridge that crosses the Firth of Forth in Scotland. The bridge opened in 1964 and, at the time, was the longest suspension bridge in the world outside the United States. The bridge connects Edinburgh to Fife; replacing a centuries-old ferry service to carry vehicular traffic, cyclists and pedestrians across the Forth. Railway crossings are made by the nearby Forth Bridge, opened in 1890.

The Scottish Parliament voted to abolish tolls on the bridge from February 2008. The adjacent Queensferry Crossing was opened in August 2017 to carry the M90 motorway across the Firth of Forth, replacing the Forth Road Bridge which had exceeded its design capacity. At its peak, the Forth Road Bridge carried 65,000 vehicles per day.

The bridge was subsequently closed for repairs and refurbishment. It reopened in February 2018, redesignated as a dedicated public transport corridor; only certain vehicles, pedestrians and cyclists are permitted to use the bridge.

== History ==
The first crossing at the site of the bridge was established in the 11th century by Margaret, queen consort of King Malcolm III, who founded a ferry service to transport religious pilgrims from Edinburgh to Dunfermline Abbey and St Andrews. Its creation gave rise to the port towns of Queensferry and North Queensferry, which remain to this day; the passenger ferry service continued without interruption for over 800 years. There were proposals as early as the 1740s for a road crossing at the site, although its viability was only considered after the Forth Bridge was built in 1890.

The importance of the crossing for vehicular traffic was underpinned when the Great Britain road numbering scheme was drawn up in the 1920s. The planners wished the arterial A9 road to be routed across the Forth here, although the unwillingness to have a ferry crossing as part of this route led to the A90 number being assigned instead.

There was more lobbying for a road crossing in the 1920s and 1930s, when the only vehicle crossing was a single passenger and vehicle ferry. Sir William Denny championed the expansion of that service in the 1930s, providing and operating on behalf of the London and North Eastern Railway two additional ferries to supplement the nearby railway bridge. Due to their success, two more ferry boats were added in the 1940s and 1950s, by which time the ferries were making 40,000 crossings annually, carrying 1.5 million passengers and 800,000 vehicles.

=== Design ===
Forth Road Bridge Order Confirmation Act 1947
- Act of Parliament
- Parliament of the United Kingdom
- Long title: An Act to confirm a Provisional Order under the Private Legislation Procedure (Scotland) Act 1936 relating to Forth Road Bridge.
- Citation: 10 & 11 Geo. 6. c. iv

Dates
- Royal assent: 29 April 1947

Other legislation
- Relates to: Private Legislation Procedure (Scotland) Act 1936

Text of statute as originally enacted

With the then newest and nearest bridge spanning the Forth (the Kincardine Bridge, built in 1936) still around 15 miles (24 km) upstream, the upsurge in demand for a road crossing between Edinburgh and Fife prompted the UK Government to establish the Forth Road Bridge Joint Board (FRBJB) by an act of Parliament, the Forth Road Bridge Order Confirmation Act 1947 (10 & 11 Geo. 6. c. iv) to oversee the implementation of a new bridge to replace the ferry service. The authorities on both sides investigated in 1955, and drew up an alternative scheme for a tunnel beneath the estuary. This was known as the Maunsell Scheme, and was projected to run somewhat closer to the rail bridge than the present road bridge. The scheme was abandoned as too ambitious, and a bridge was built instead.

=== Construction ===
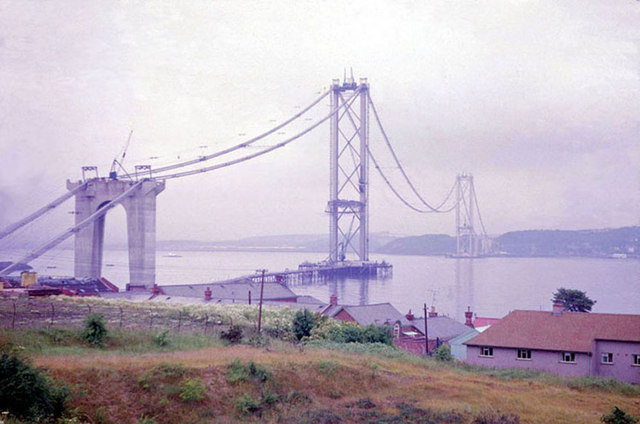
Under construction in July 1962

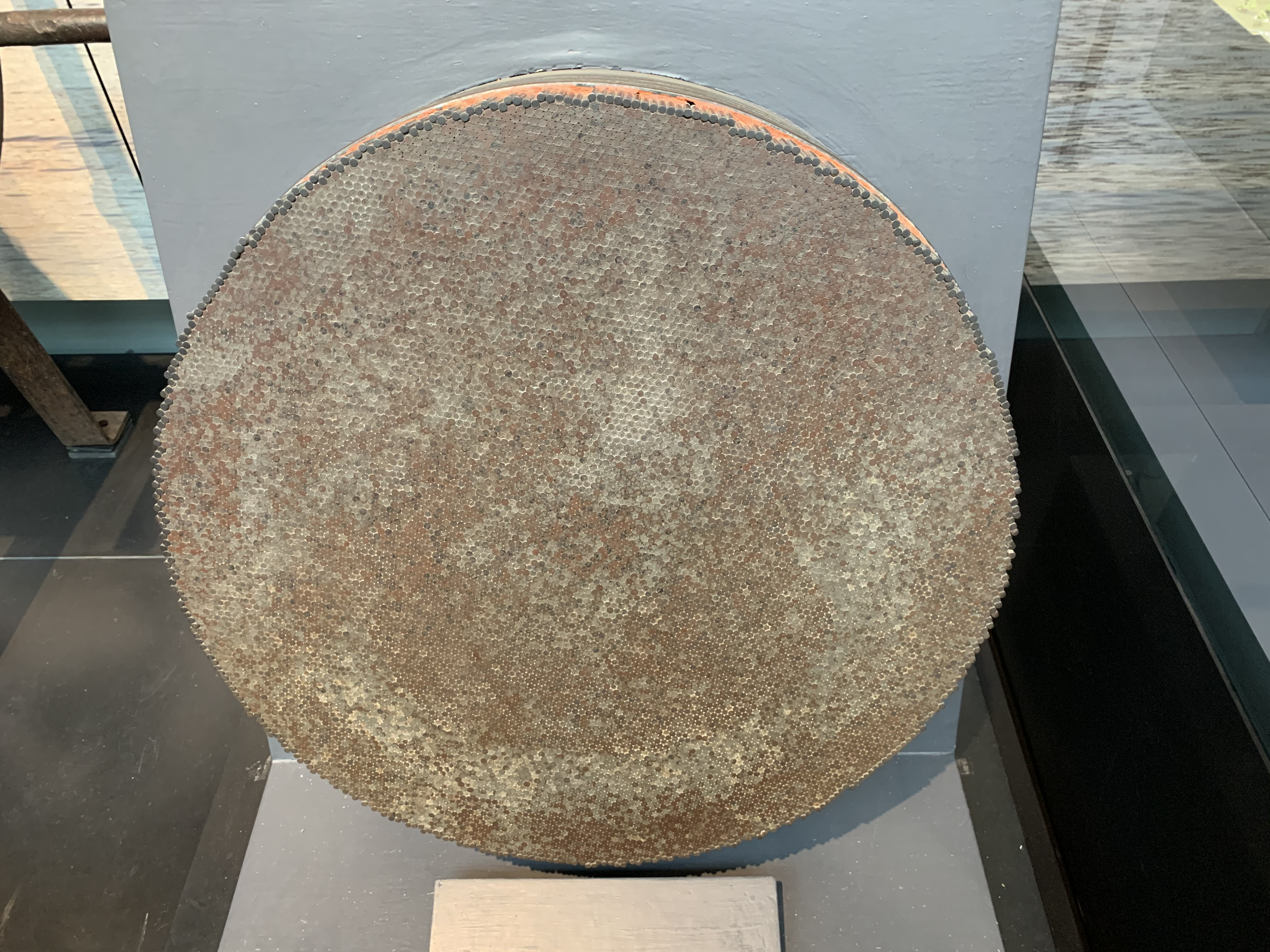
A section of cable from the Forth Bridge, at the National Museum of Scotland, 2020

The final construction plan was accepted in February 1958 and work began that September. Mott, Hay and Anderson and Freeman Fox & Partners carried out the design work and a joint venture of Sir William Arrol & Co., Cleveland Bridge & Engineering Company and Dorman Long constructed the bridge at a cost of £15.1 million. The resident design engineer was John Alexander King Hamilton FRSE (1900–1982).

It was the longest steel suspension bridge in Europe. It used 210,000 tons of concrete, with 9 miles (14 kilometres) of grade-separated dual-carriageway approach roads. Reed & Mallik built the approach viaducts.

Twenty-four individual bridges were built for the approach roads. The 4 1/2-mile (7.2 km) southern approach road of the A90 began at Cramond Bridge, over the River Almond on the western outskirts of Edinburgh, near Craigiehall. There were two-level interchanges built at Burnshot, Dolphington (B924) and the Echline junction (A904 and B800). At Dalmeny there was a bridge over the railway. The southern approach roads were built by A.M. Carmichael Ltd. The 4 mi (6 km) northern approach road had three two-level junctions at Ferry Toll (for the B980), Admiralty (for Rosyth Dockyard via the A985, and Inverkeithing via the A921) and at Mastertown/Masterton (for what would be the fledgling M90 southern terminus). The Masterton junction was originally planned as a octopus interchange connecting to the proposed East Fife Regional Road, but it was downgraded to a semi-directional T after the East Fife Regional Road was re-routed along a more northerly alignment (which now part of the A92). There were fifteen bridges built for this approach road. The northern approach road terminated as the A823(M) at a roundabout with the A823 south of Dunfermline, next to Rosyth railway station. The northern approach roads were built by Whatlings Ltd of Glasgow, later bought by Alfred McAlpine.

Seven people died during construction before the bridge was opened by Queen Elizabeth II and the Duke of Edinburgh on 4 September 1964. The ferry service was discontinued as of that date.

=== Operation ===
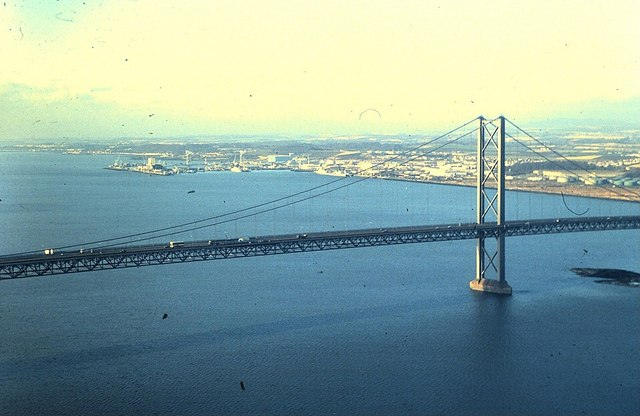
The bridge in 1982

The bridge's management was delegated to the FRBJB, and remained so until 2002 when its operation was transferred to a new body with a wider remit, the Forth Estuary Transport Authority.

On 1 December 2010, the bridge was closed for the first time due to heavy snow. After several accidents meant snowploughs were unable to clear the carriageways, the bridge was closed in both directions at 6.40 a.m. and remained closed for several hours.

As part of celebrations of the 50th anniversary of the bridge's operation, artist Kate Downie was commissioned to create a print of the bridge and hold an exhibition of works portraying it.

On 1 June 2015, Amey took over the maintenance and operating of the bridge on behalf of Transport Scotland from the Forth Estuary Transport Authority, and are now called the Forth Bridges Unit.

=== Structural issues ===
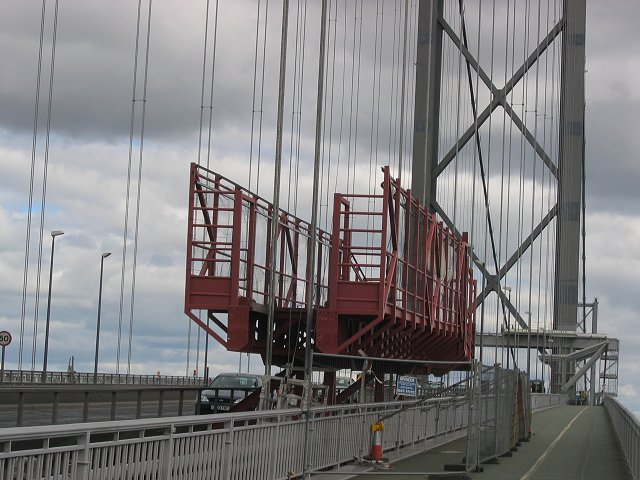
An inspection of the integrity of the cables under way on the bridge

Forth Estuary Transport Authority (FETA) began to be concerned over the structural wear of the bridge in the early years of the 21st century. The planned theoretical capacity for the bridge (30,000 vehicles per day in each direction) was routinely exceeded as traffic levels outstripped predictions. The Scottish Government stated in 2006 that 60,000 vehicles travelled on more than half the days in a year. This raised concerns about the lifespan of the bridge, originally planned at 120 years.

In 2003, an inspection programme was launched (costing £1.2 million) to assess the condition of the main suspension cables after corrosion was discovered in a number of older bridges in the United States of a similar design and size. The study was completed two years later and reported that the main cables had suffered an 8%–10% loss of strength. This weakening was projected to accelerate, with traffic restrictions to limit loading required in 2014 in the worst-case scenario, followed by full closure by 2020.

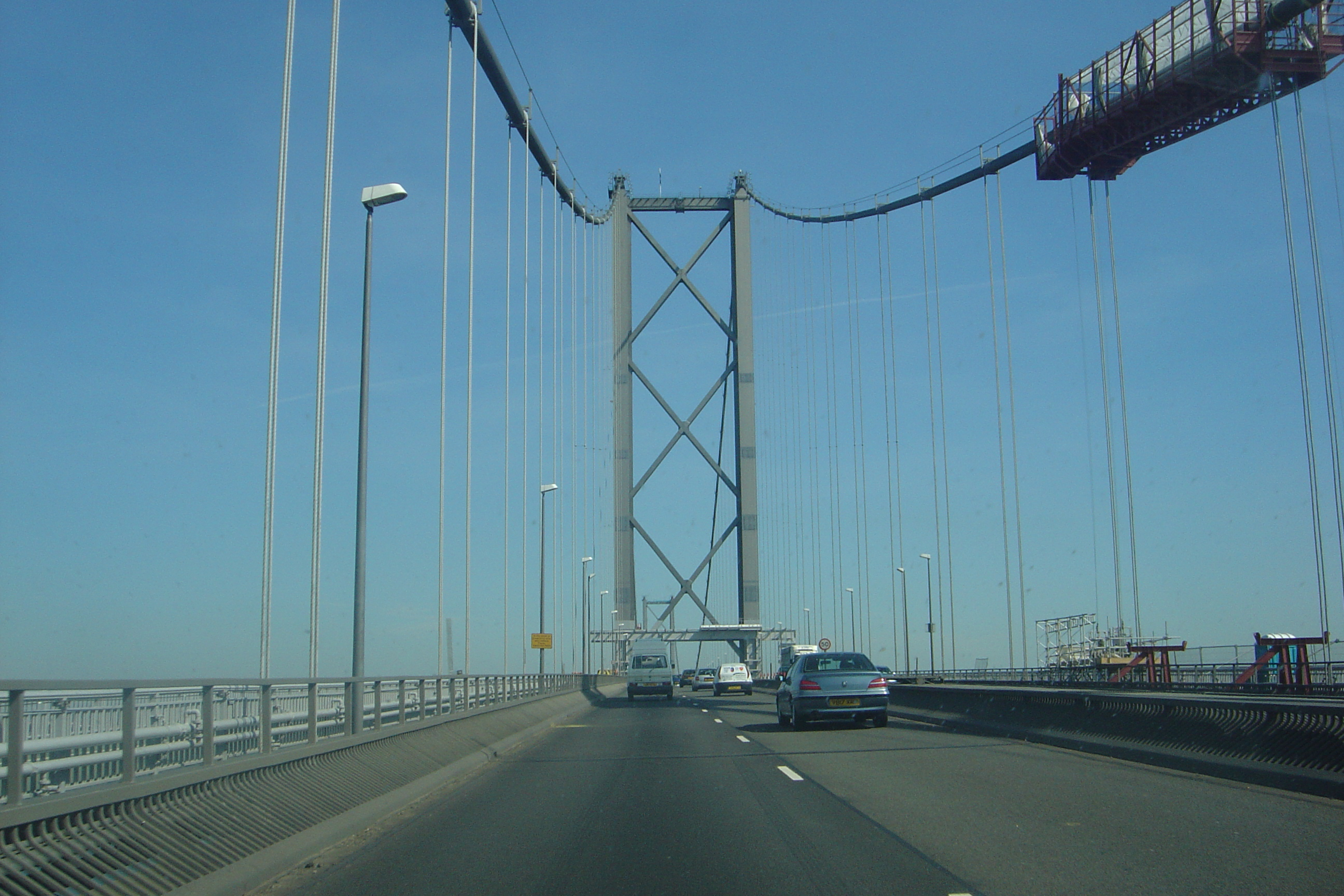
High-tensile wires suspending the deck of the northbound carriageway

An acoustic monitoring system was commissioned in August 2006, using listening devices to monitor any further strands snapping and pinpoint their location within the main cables. In January 2006, the Scottish Executive completed a third-party audit on the bridge which concluded that FETA had performed the initial internal inspection and cable strength calculation in accordance with accepted practice. The report suggested that traffic restrictions could be required by 2013.

Several actions were taken to increase the bridge's lifespan. These included a dehumidification programme that slowed the rate of corrosion in the main cables by keeping air in the voids between the main cables' strands below 40% humidity. Engineering consultants Faber Maunsell began work on the project in 2006; it took two and a half years to complete at a cost of £7.8 million. As part of the works, some of the corroded cable strands were spliced.

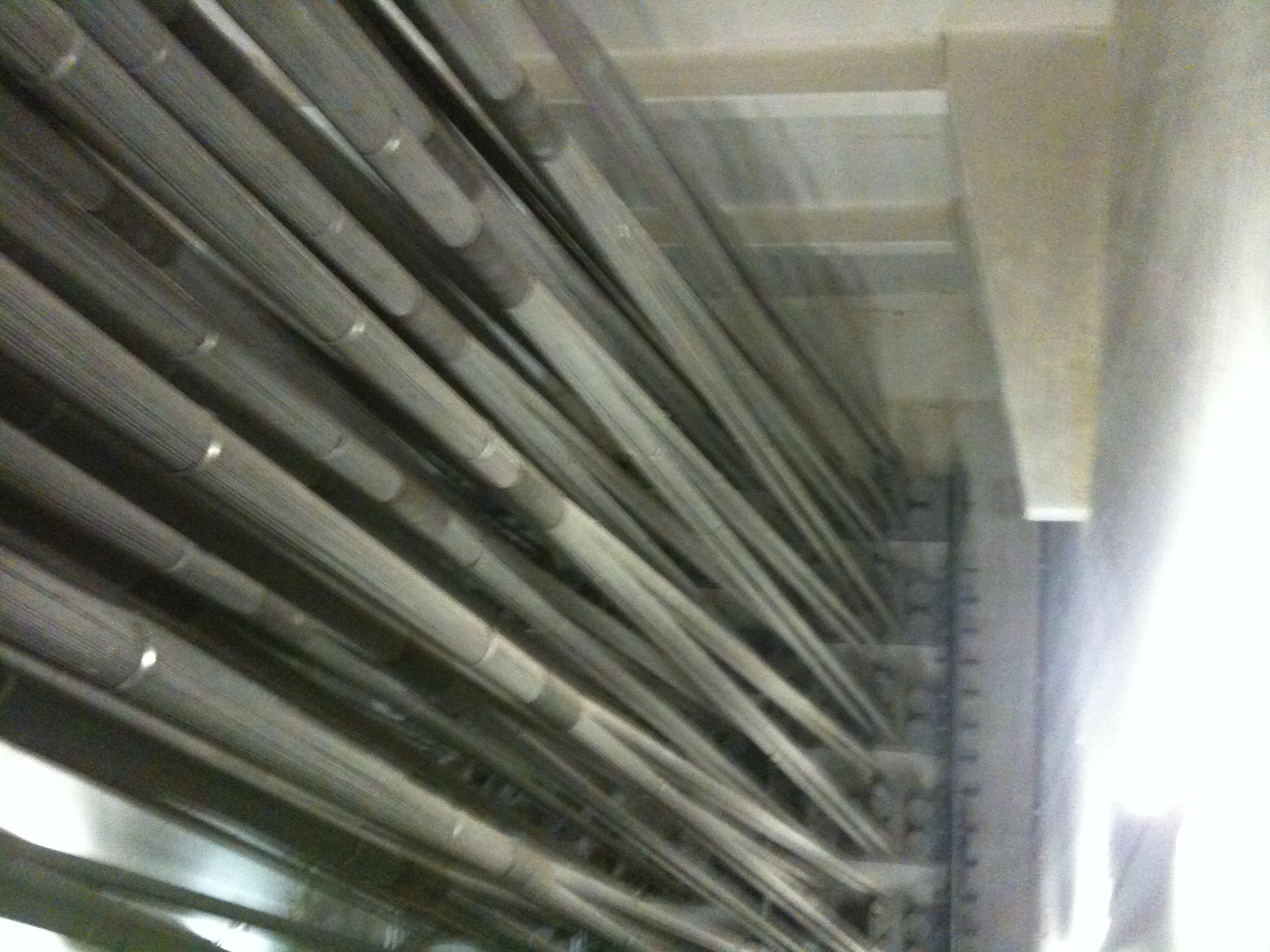
Forth Road Bridge anchorage chamber, north side

The southbound carriageway of the bridge was closed on 1 December 2015, with all traffic using a single lane each way on the northbound carriageway after steelwork defects had been discovered during routine inspections, and traffic was restricted to 7.5 tonnes or less (public service vehicles excepted). On 4 December, the bridge was fully closed when further structural faults were found. It was initially not expected to reopen until January 2016, and Transport Scotland began work to lay on extra trains and buses and considered whether to reintroduce a ferry service to mitigate the impact on travellers.

On 23 December, the bridge was reopened for all traffic except heavy goods vehicles (HGVs). On 4 February, it was announced this had been pushed back to March, due to further problems with the truss end link pins in the southern towers, which required additional remedial work. However, a limited number of HGVs were allowed to cross, in a northbound direction only, between 11 pm and 4 am each night. On 20 February 2016, the bridge was fully reopened.

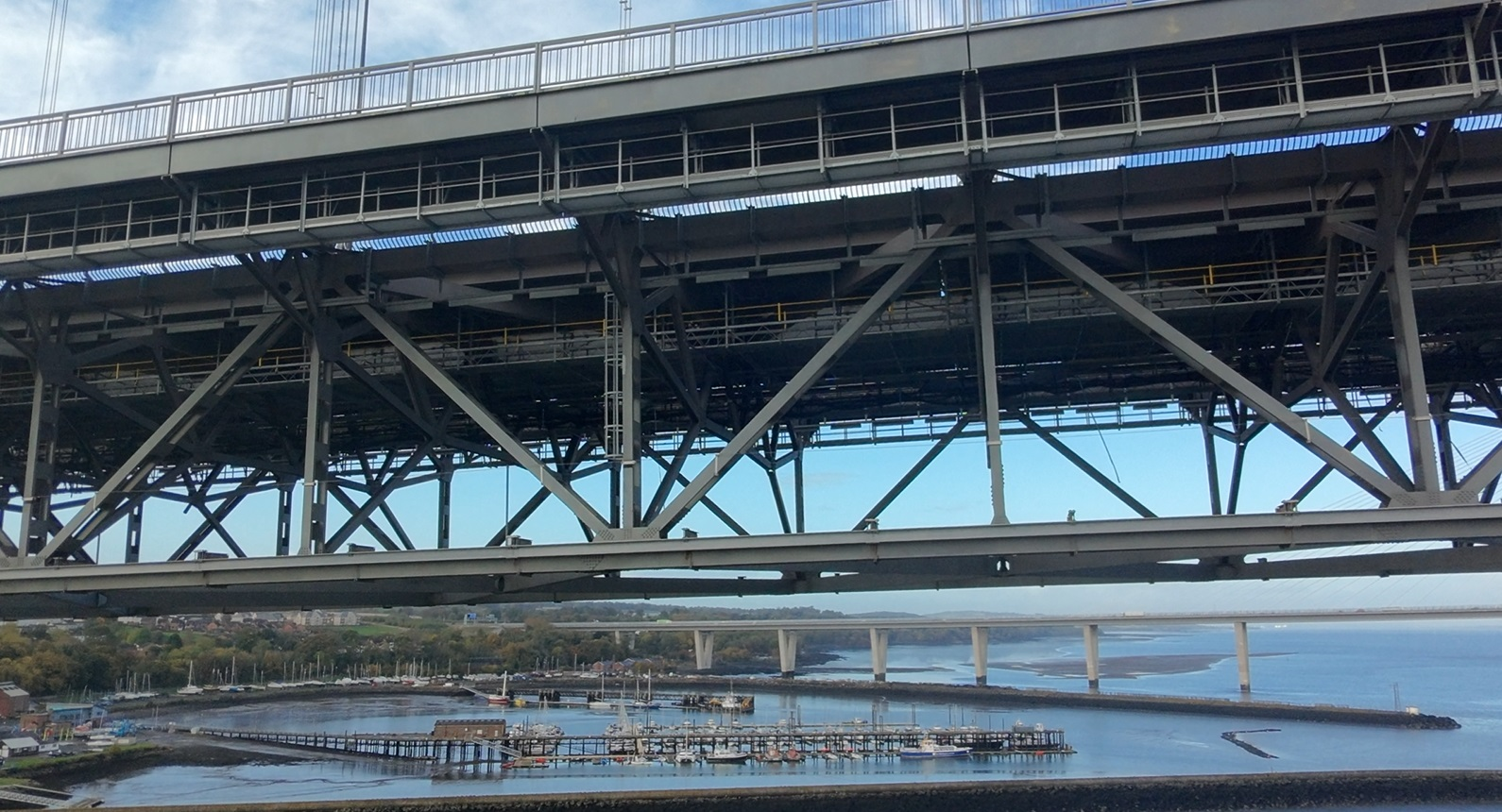
Undercarriage of Forth Road Bridge, 2024

On 20 January 2016, the Scottish Parliament began an inquiry led by the Infrastructure and Capital Investment Committee (ICI) to determine the circumstances that led to the discovery of a cracked truss in the bridge's undercarriage. Evidence was heard from FETA, Transport Minister Derek Mackay, engineers and officials from Amey along with a number of other experts and key personnel.

On the first day, Richard Hornby, of engineering consulting firm Arup, stated that the truss end in question had been inspected 23 times since 2001, and no fault had been found. It was revealed that a pin had seized up, which caused the truss end to crack, and it was only the quality of the steel which had stopped its cracking appearing earlier. Hornby also made clear that even if the seized pin had been picked up earlier, it was "virtually impossible" to lubricate the bearing. Several witnesses defended a decision by previous operator FETA not to proceed with a £15 million truss end link replacement project in 2010. This was disputed by Barry Colford, former chief engineer and bridgemaster at FETA. Lesley Hinds, FETA's former convener, pointed out that the bridge budget had been cut by 58% in 2011, while senior staff at FETA had "deep concerns" about the transfer of bridge management to a private company.

=== New crossings and change of use ===
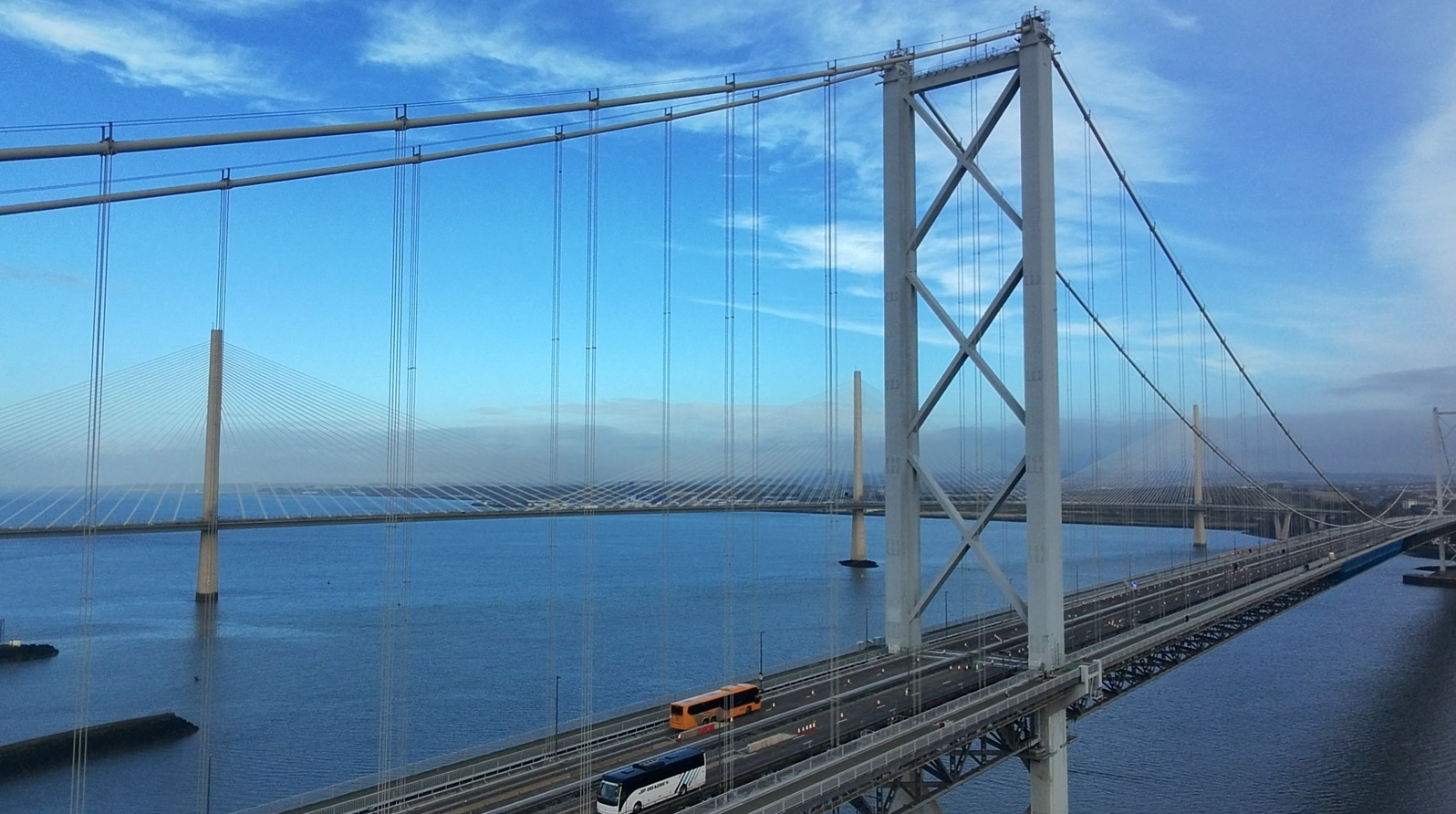
Forth Road Bridge operating as a public transport corridor, 2024. Queensferry Crossing, the newer road bridge crossing the Firth of Forth, is shown in the background.

The strategic transport importance of the road bridge and the threat of closure by 2020 if major structural work were not undertaken led to fears of serious economic consequences. Increasing traffic levels across the Firth of Forth had also led to the construction of the Clackmannanshire Bridge adjacent to the existing Kincardine Bridge. This bridge opened in November 2008.

Proposals for a second road crossing at Queensferry had been made in the 1990s, but were shelved, despite preliminary work on route selection. Following the discovery of potentially serious structural issues with the Forth Road Bridge in 2005 the proposals were revisited and plans advanced. The decision to proceed with a replacement bridge was taken at the end of 2007, and it was announced the following year that the existing bridge would be retained as a public transport link. The Forth Crossing Act received Royal Assent in January 2011, and the new bridge was opened in late 2017.

On 1 February 2018, the Forth Road Bridge became a Public Transport Corridor, with all approach roads in full operation. The bridge was closed between September and mid October 2017 for roadworks before partially reopening for public buses.

As of December 2020, work was underway that would allow the Forth Road Bridge to become an emergency diversion route for private transport. The Queensferry Crossing has proofing that makes it less vulnerable to high winds than the Forth Road Bridge, but it was closed for the first time in February 2020 due to accumulations of ice on its towers.

In May 2023, Stagecoach East Scotland started the UK's first driverless bus service to carry passengers between Ferrytoll Park and Ride and Edinburgh Park station, with the Forth Road Bridge included in the route. The service was terminated in December 2024 due to lack of interest.

== Statistics ==
The bridge's central main span is 1,006 metres (3,301 ft) long, its two side spans are each 408 metres (1,339 ft) long, and the approach viaducts are 257 metres (843 ft) on the north side and 438 metres (1,437 ft) on the south side. The total length is 2,512 metres (8,241 ft). It was the longest suspension bridge span outside the United States and the fourth-longest span in the world at the time of its construction. The bridge is made of 39,000 tonnes of steel and 115,000 cubic metres of concrete. The towers reach 156 metres (512 ft) above mean water level. There is a dual carriageway road with two lanes in each direction, and cycle/footpaths on each side. The main strung cables are 590 millimetres (23 in) in diameter, with 11,618 high tensile wires, each five millimetres in diameter, and each cable carries 13,800 tonnes of the bridge's load.

The bridge formed a crucial part of the corridor between south-east and north-east Scotland, linking Edinburgh to Perth, Dundee and Aberdeen by the A90 road and its sister M90 motorway, which used to begin 1 2/3 miles (2.7 km) north of the bridge's northern end. The bridge carried around 2.5 million vehicles in its first year, increasing to around 21.4 million vehicles in 2008. The bridge carried its 250 millionth vehicle in 2002.

It was awarded Historic Scotland's Category A listed structure status in 2001.

== Tolls ==
On 11 February 2008, tolls were abolished on the bridge by the Scottish Government.

Initially, it was suggested that tolls would cease once the original cost of construction (plus accrued interest) was repaid. This was achieved in 1993, and it was planned that tolls would not be levied after May 1995. Instead, legislation enabling the continued levying of tolls was renewed by Parliament (originally that of the UK but now the Scottish Parliament) in 1998, 2003 and finally by the Forth Road Bridge (Toll Period) Extension Order 2006.

Originally, a toll was paid for each direction of travel, with sets of tollbooths on both carriageways. In 1997, the northbound toll was doubled (from 40p to 80p) and the southbound toll abolished on the presumption that almost all traffic makes a return journey across the bridge, and that the removal of the southbound toll would result in a reduction of congestion without reducing revenue.

FETA said the continued charging of tolls was necessary to fund maintenance and improvement works. These included the construction of defences around the submerged piers forming the bases of the main towers to guard against collisions. The main towers were also strengthened with internal steel columns (the original tower structure was hollow) and had hydraulic rams jack up these sections to transfer a portion of the load to the new steelwork. Also, the vertical cables suspending the deck had their bolts replaced after a detected failure. A new paint system required development for the bridge (the original was phased out due to environmental concerns).

=== Variable tolling proposals ===
In late-2005, FETA's committee approved a proposed revamp of the tolls. The minimum toll would stay fixed at £1, but higher tolls would be charged at some times of day, with a maximum of £4 during evening rush hours. All tolls would be halved for cars with more than one occupant, as an incentive for motorists to share cars and make fewer journeys. According to FETA's chairman Lawrence Marshall, the system would provide the most efficiency; he said that 80% of peak-time journeys are made by single-occupant vehicles. The proposal, passed with the chairman's casting vote after the committee was deadlocked, was referred to the Scottish Executive in December 2005, and implementation planned for October 2007 subject to approval by Transport Minister Tavish Scott. Environmental groups welcomed the proposal, but local politicians condemned it as simply a means of raising capital. At the same time, Fife councillors counter-proposed the complete removal of tolls.

The Scottish Parliament debated the proposals in January 2006, and the affair became a major political issue after UK Cabinet Ministers Gordon Brown and Alistair Darling (Chancellor of the Exchequer and Secretary of State for Scotland respectively) were seen to describe the variable tolling plan as "dead in the water". Scottish First Minister Jack McConnell insisted his Labour Party colleagues were misquoted, and refused to rule out the plan, receiving criticism from the opposition Scottish National Party.

There was a by-election on 9 February 2006 for Dunfermline and West Fife, the constituency in which the north end of the bridge is situated. It was contested (in addition to the major political parties in Scotland) by an Abolish Forth Bridge Tolls Party. Liberal Democrat candidate Willie Rennie won the election, overturning a large Labour majority on a 16% swing. Afterwards, media speculated that the Executive had turned against the proposals, and Tavish Scott eventually confirmed their rejection and the retention of the existing toll structure on 1 March 2006. FETA condemned the decision, while local opposition MSPs charged the Minister that his tolling review short-changed Fifers as tolls were axed on the Erskine Bridge, leaving tolls on just the Forth and Tay Road Bridges.

=== Abolition ===
When an SNP minority government was formed after the Scottish parliamentary election of May 2007, a new debate on the abolition of tolls was opened by Transport Minister Stewart Stevenson on 31 May 2007, and the abolition was agreed by a large majority. Annual toll income at that point totalled £16,000,000.

The Abolition of Bridge Tolls (Scotland) Bill was introduced in the Scottish Parliament on 3 September 2007, passed on 20 December 2007, and received royal assent as the Abolition of Bridge Tolls (Scotland) Act 2008 on 24 January 2008. The tolls were removed on 11 February 2008 at 00:01 GMT. The abolition of the tolls was enacted immediately after a major reconstruction of the northbound toll plaza was completed.

== Suicides ==
In 2011, it was stated that around 800 people had fallen to their deaths since the bridge had opened. A report in 2000 stated that prior to then, four people had survived falling from the bridge. In 2018, Scottish singer-songwriter Scott Hutchison of Frightened Rabbit took his life by jumping off the bridge, ten years after releasing "Floating in the Forth", a song from the album The Midnight Organ Fight about considering and ultimately deciding against committing suicide in the Forth River.

== See also ==
- DoCoMoMo Key Scottish Monuments
- List of Category A listed buildings in Edinburgh
- List of Category A listed buildings in Fife
- List of bridges in Scotland
- List of longest suspension bridge spans
- List of post-war Category A listed buildings in Scotland
- Prospect 100 best modern Scottish buildings
