= Muirhouse =

Suburb of Edinburgh, Scotland

Coordinates: 55°58′19.22″N 3°15′16.00″W

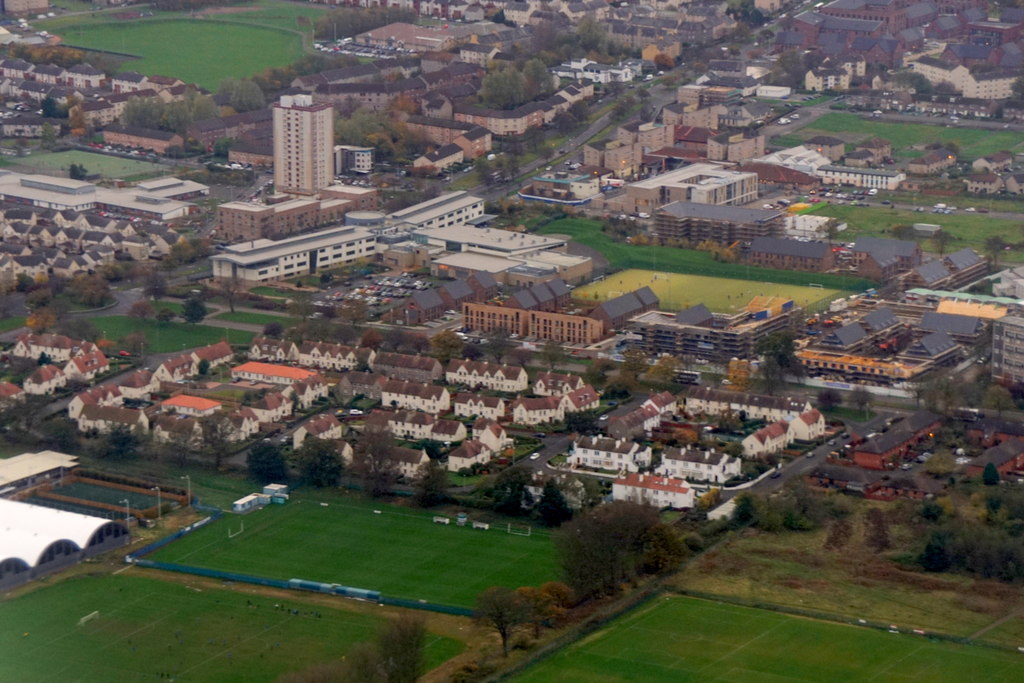
Aerial view of Muirhouse

Muirhouse is a housing estate in the north of Edinburgh, the capital of Scotland.

== Location ==
The housing estate of Muirhouse (Pennywell and Muirhouse) is bounded by Muirhouse Parkway to the North, Pennywell Road to the East, Ferry Road to the South, and the boundary with Silverknowes to the West.

It is west of Granton (the housing estates of East Pilton and West Pilton), and north-east of Davidsons Mains.

== History ==
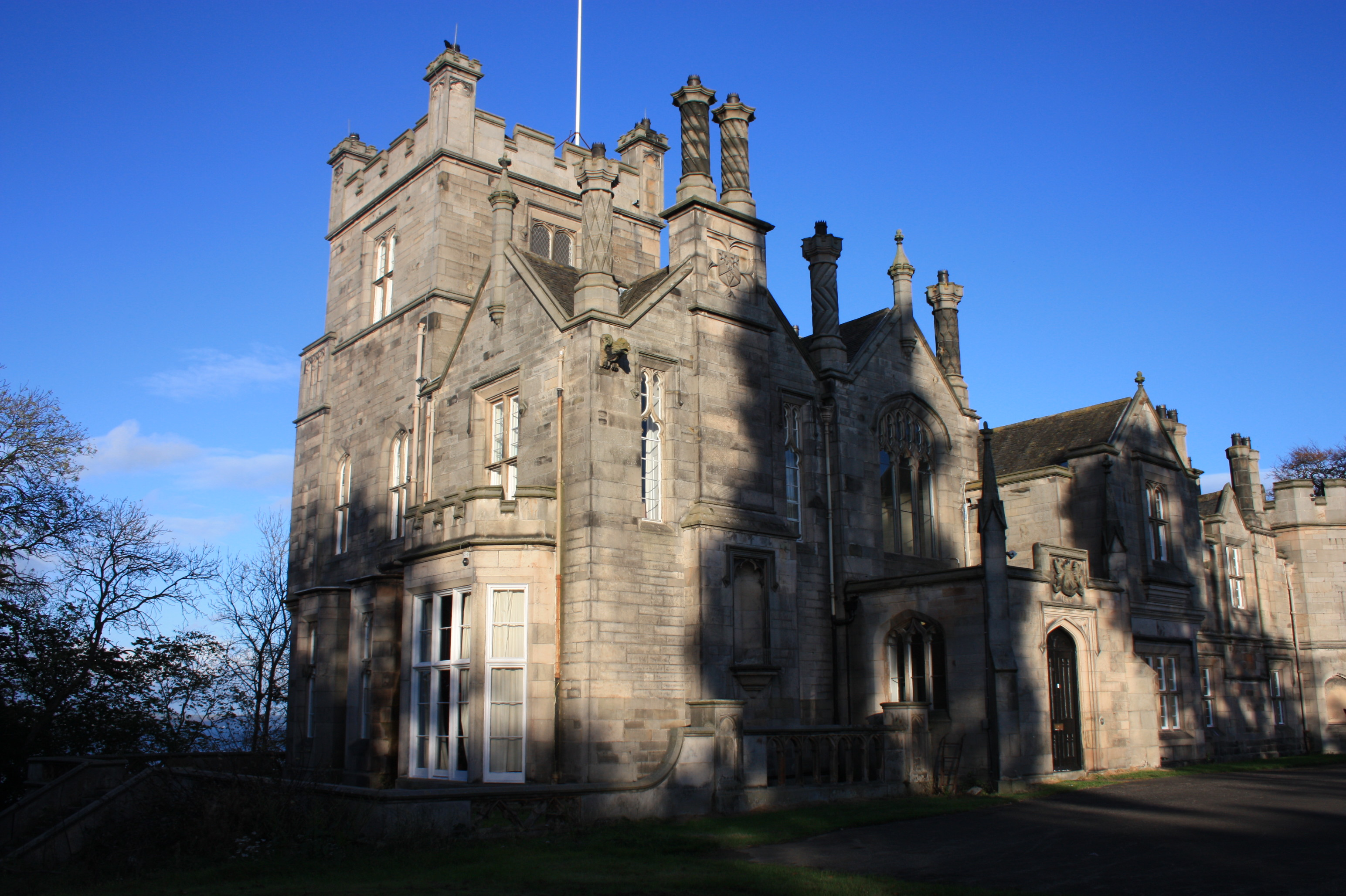
Muirhouse Mansion (1832) in north Edinburgh

The residential estate of Muirhouse takes its name from Muirhouse (Moore Huse) which appears on early maps of Edinburgh from at least 1610. The name derives from a mansion built on the edge of Wardie Muir (Moor).

In 1794 William Davidson died and left the mansion and estate to his nephew Rev Thomas Randall of St Giles Cathedral, on condition that he assumed the name of Thomas Randall Davidson (which he did). His son William Davidson (1783-1865) inherited the mansion in 1827 when his father died.

A second building, known as Muirhouse Mansion, was designed by R & R Dickson in 1830 and completed in 1832. It was built for the Davidson family, who were wealthy merchants trading in Rotterdam. This second Muirhouse Mansion building remains, and is located north of the current Edinburgh caravan and motorhome campsite, on Marine Parade.

The old Muirhouse was left to slowly collapse, with the last vestiges surviving into the 1960s, and then known as Muirhouse Towers. Two 50 ft (15 m) high towers that were part of the original Muirhouse were still standing at the time work began on the housing development, but these were demolished in 1954 after they became unsafe.

Muirhouse Housing Estate.

As part of the post-war (WW2) programme to clear slums and reduce population density in the Edinburgh city centre, development of council housing estates were planned around the city's boundaries. This included the residential area of Muirhouse located approximately 1 km south of Muirhouse Mansion. Development of the Muirhouse council estate began in 1953.

The housing is predominantly owned by council and other housing authorities, and occupied by tenants. Though since the early 1980s tenants of social housing were granted a right to buy their house under the UK Conservative Government's “Right to Buy scheme”. Although the policy helped to increase private home ownership, it is also responsible for the drastic reduction in social housing stock. The scheme is no longer in place in Scotland since 2016.

== Housing ==
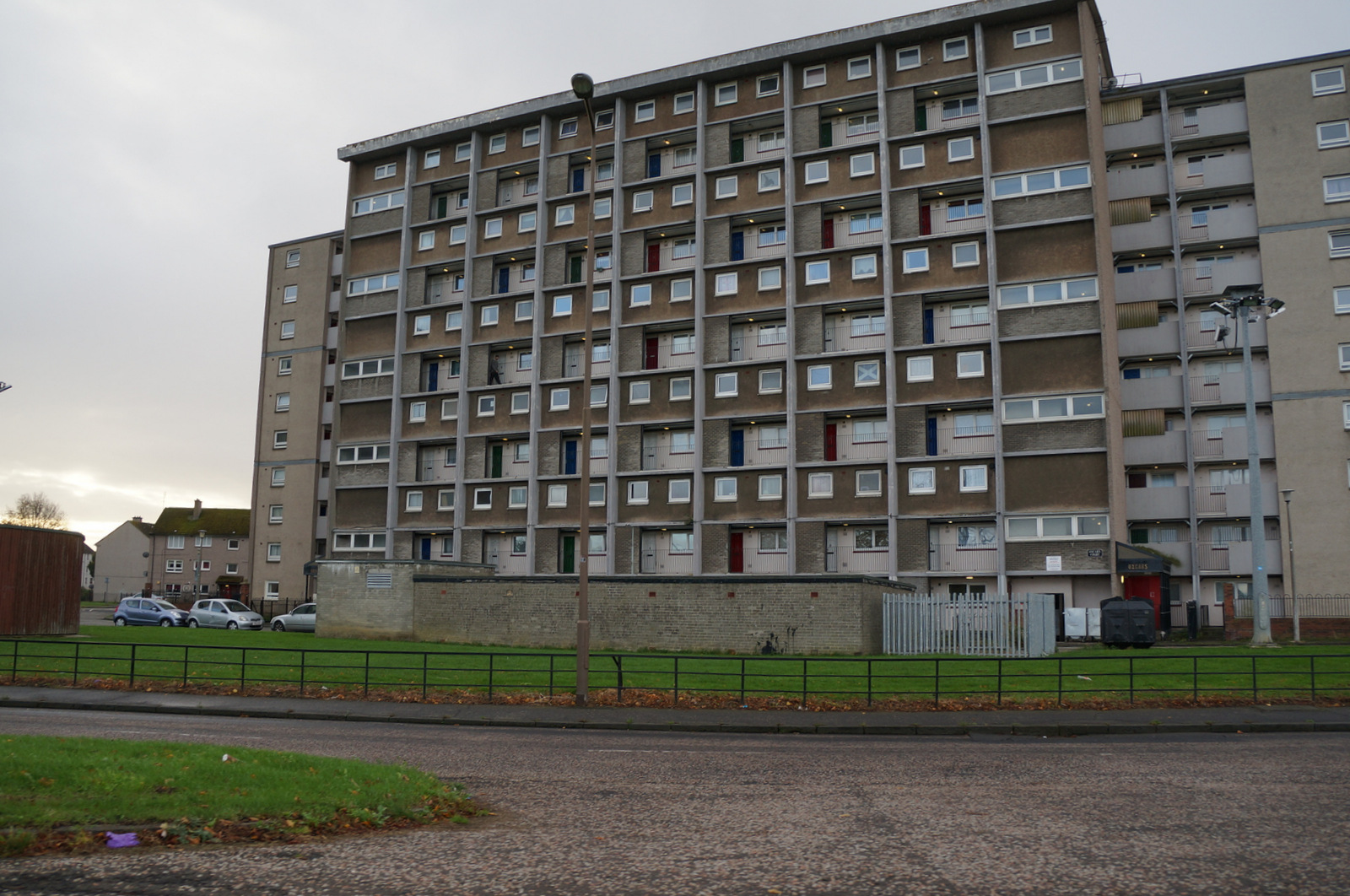
Block of maisonettes at Muirhouse Grove (2014)

The initial development of the Muirhouse Housing Estate included the first 200 of the over 4000 pre-fabricated houses built by the Edinburgh housing corporation in the 1950s.

The website Granton History provides a link to a 1953 map which indicates the proposed layout of the initial Muirhouse housing estate.

Despite extensions to the city boundary in 1954, by 1958 suburban land for housing estates had started to run out. By the 1960s the initial low density pre-fabricated housing had been demolished to make way for much higher density housing, including several tower blocks.

These include the 23-storey tower block Martello Court, which accommodates 88 flats. Other high rise blocks in the area include Birnies Court, Fidra Court, Gunnet Court and Inchmickery Court.

The Edinburgh Evening News compiled a short article documenting the history of the estate, including twenty two pictures from the area in the 1950s and 1960s.

The area became regarded as one of the most deprived areas of Edinburgh. Particularly during the 1980s when the Muirhouse housing estate, and its residents were blighted by drug addiction, crime, Anti-social behaviour and HIV/AIDS. Some aspects of this are documented in the 2012 BBC Two documentary My Lives and Times, an interview with former police officer Tom Wood, and the 2019 documentary Choose Life: Edinburgh’s Battle Against Aids.

In recent years major redevelopment of the area has commenced. The City of Edinburgh Council have undertaken the long term Pennywell and Muirhouse Regeneration Project. Much of the area's low-mid rise housing has been, or is set to be demolished as part of the City Council's plan to provide 1,100 new council houses in some of the city's most deprived estates. The Muirhouse Housing Association is involved in redevelopment work. This project commenced in 2008 and is due to be completed in 2025.

Martello Court, which was once seen as the centre of Muirhouse's social problems has been refurbished, and now holds a better reputation.

== Education ==
Craigroyston Community High School is a secondary comprehensive school located in Muirhouse on Pennywell Road.

An initial part of the Pennywell and Muirhouse redevelopment project has included relocation and replacement of the Craigroyston Community High School, from its original location at the Southern end of Pennywell Road to the Northern end of this road, in 2010.

Muirhouse also has a primary school, Craigroyston Primary School , which opened in November 2002, and Oaklands School, for learners with profound and multiple learning disabilities, which opened in 2006.

== Religion ==
The main churches were Muirhouse St. Andrew's Parish Church (Church of Scotland) and St Paul's Roman Catholic Church. The former united with The Old Kirk of Edinburgh in 2014 to become The Old Kirk and Muirhouse parish church. St Paul's closed around 2016 and the building is now demolished.

== Notable residents ==
The author Irvine Welsh lived for some time in Muirhouse. Former Scotland national football team player and manager Gordon Strachan grew up in Muirhouse.

== Demographics ==
Ethnicity	Muirhouse (Forth Ward)	Edinburgh
White	84.6%	84.9%
Asian	7.1%	8.6%
Black	3.6%	2.1%
Mixed	2.0%	2.5%
Other	2.7%	1.9%
