= John Main (minister) =

Scottish minister and Royal Society co-founder

John Main FRSE (1728–1795) was a Scottish minister who was one of the co-founders of the Royal Society of Edinburgh in 1783.

== Life ==
He was born in Edinburgh in 1728.

He studied divinity at St Andrews University and was licensed to preach by the Church of Scotland in 1753 being ordained as minister of Newton, West Lothian.

He died in Newton on 13 May 1795.
