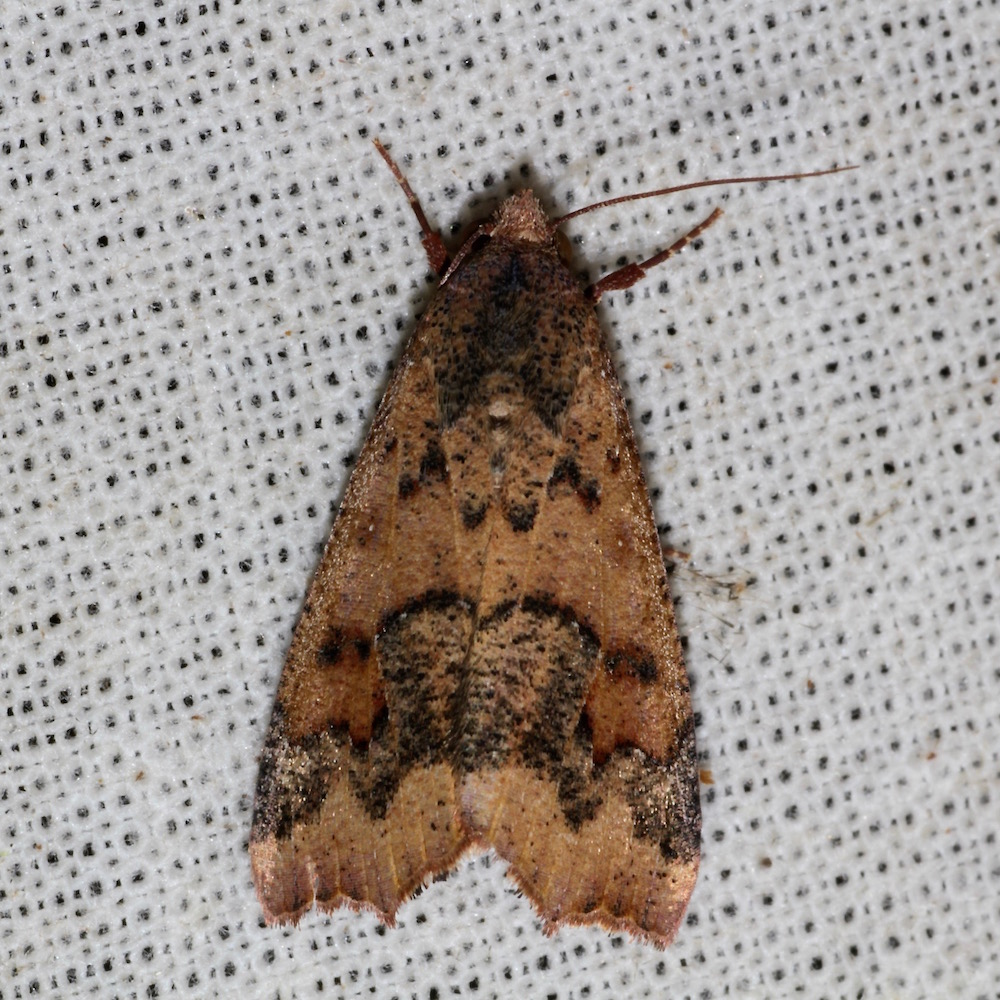
- From South Africa
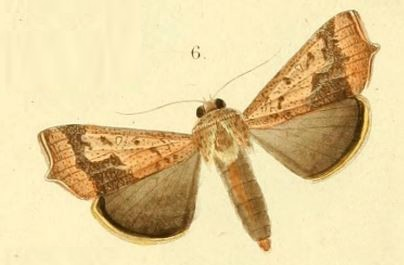

Scientific classification
- Kingdom: Animalia
- Phylum: Arthropoda
- Class: Insecta
- Order: Lepidoptera
- Superfamily: Noctuoidea
- Family: Erebidae
- Genus: Anomis
- Species: A. sabulifera

Binomial name
- Anomis sabulifera Guenée, 1852

Synonyms
- Gonitis sabulifera Guenée, [1852]; Gonitis propingua Butler, [1884]; Gonitis marginata Holland, [1894]

= Anomis sabulifera =

Angled gem

Species of moth

Anomis sabulifera, the angled gem or jute semi-looper, is a moth of the family Erebidae. The species was first described by Achille Guenée in 1852. It has a Paleotropical distribution and ranges from Africa eastwards to India, Sri Lanka and Australia. A single record was found from Britain.

== Description ==
Its wingspan is about 32–38 mm. The antennae of the male is ciliated. Antemedial line of forewings bent outwards between vein 1 and inner margin. The postmedial line incurved beyond the cell. It has diffused black on the antemedial line of forewings and between postmedial and sub-marginal lines. A small orbicular spot usually present and two specks conjoined into a reniform spot.

== Ecology ==
There are multiple generations per year. The larvae mainly feed on species of the families Malvaceae and Tiliaceae. Recorded food plants include Althaea spp., Abelmoschus esculentus, Hibiscus tiliaceus, Commersonia bartramia, Corchorus capsularis Corchorus olitorius, Gossypium spp., Grewia occidentalis, and Triumfetta rhomboidea.

== Attack and control ==
It is a major pest of jute throughout the world. Fruits, growing seedlings, leaves and seeds are mostly affected by the caterpillars and adults as well. They externally feed on the plant parts leading to dieback, chlorosis and reduction of harvest. The whole plant may result dwarf after excessive infection. The first attack symptoms can be seen in the shoot apex region.

Biological controlling methods are extensively used. No indication of chemical usage reported in the fields. In early times, predatory birds such as cuckoos of the family Cuculidae are used, but not known today. The spores of Bacillus thuringiensis and Beauveria bassiana are known to effective. Beauveria bassiana should mix with potato dextrose broth and amino acid solutions prior to in usage. In Bangladesh, inoculation with nuclear polyhedrosis virus controlled 80 percent of the attack.
