= Ganiyu Oboh =

Nigerian biochemist

- Born: Nigeria
- Education: Federal University of Technology Akure
- Known for: Functional food research, antioxidant mechanisms, ethnopharmacology
- Awards: Humboldt Fellow, AD Scientific Index Top Scientist, NSBMB Research Recognition
- Scientific career
- Fields: Biochemistry, Nutritional Biochemistry, Food Chemistry
- Workplaces: Federal University of Technology Akure

Ganiyu Oboh is a Nigerian Professor of Applied Biochemistry at the Federal University of Technology Akure, Ondo State. He is currently the head of the Functional Food and Nutraceutical Laboratory Unit in the Department of Biochemistry and has recommended a cure to diabetes. In 2021, he was awarded the Best Researcher according to Alper-Doger Scientific Index.

== Education ==
Ganiyu Oboh obtained his first degree in the Department of Biochemistry at the Federal University of Technology, Akure, in 1992. He then earned his Master's degree in Technology and Ph.D. degree in Applied Biochemistry in 1997 and 2002, respectively, from the same institution. He did his post-doctoral training in Biochemistry Toxicology in 2005 at Universidade Federal de Santa Maria, Santa Maria RS, Brazil and his second post-doctoral training in Food Biochemistry and Toxicology between 2007 and 2008 at Technische Universität Dresden, Germany.

== Career and research ==
Oboh joined the Department of Biochemistry at FUTA, where he rose to the rank of Professor of Applied Biochemistry. His research areas include nutritional biochemistry, plant biochemistry, and food chemistry. In a 2017 lecture on "Functional Foods: Paradigm for Health and Wellness," he highlighted the connections between poor diet and diseases like diabetes, stroke, cancer, and heart disease. He advocates increased consumption of fruits and vegetables to mitigate these risks.

His scientific research also explores the antioxidant activities of indigenous plant materials. Studies by Oboh have demonstrated that extracts of sage (Salvia officinalis) and jute leaves (Corchorus olitorius) exhibit antioxidant properties and inhibitory effects on lipid peroxidation in liver and brain tissues.

As of 2025, his research output on Scopus includes over 300 scholarly publications with more than 8,700 citations and an h-index of 46.

Oboh's research interests include:

- Neuroprotection: Investigating natural cholinesterase and MAO inhibitors for cognitive health.
- Diabetes management: Studying the inhibitory effects of functional foods on α-amylase and α-glucosidase activities related to blood glucose regulation.
- Antioxidants: Evaluating and quantifying antioxidant activities of phenolic compounds in tropical vegetables and spices.
