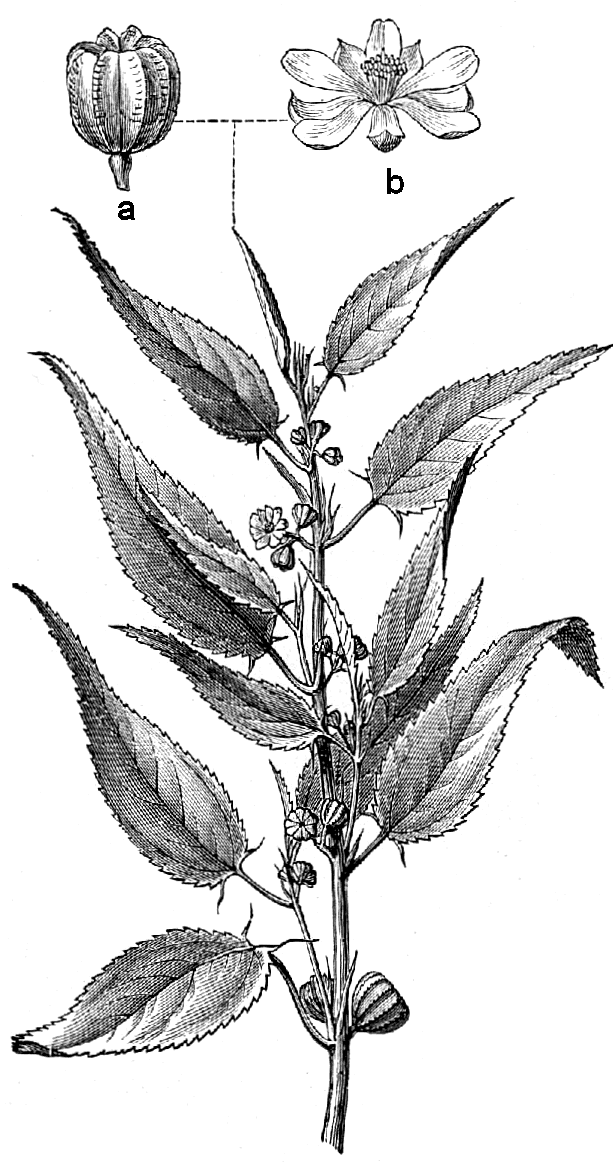

Scientific classification
- Kingdom: Plantae
- Clade: Tracheophytes
- Clade: Angiosperms
- Clade: Eudicots
- Clade: Rosids
- Order: Malvales
- Family: Malvaceae
- Genus: Corchorus
- Species: C. capsularis

Binomial name
- Corchorus capsularis L.

Synonyms
- Corchorus cordifolius Salisb.; Corchorus marua Buch.-Ham. nom. inval.

= Corchorus capsularis =

Species of flowering plant

Corchorus capsularis (also known as patsun), commonly known as white jute, is a shrub species in the family Malvaceae. It is one of the sources of jute fibre, considered to be of finer quality than fibre from Corchorus olitorius, the main source of jute. The leaves are used as a foodstuff and the leaves, unripe fruit and the roots are used in traditional medicine.

== Description ==
Corchorus capsularis is an erect, annual shrub, with acute leaves, yellow five-petaled flowers and growing to two or more metres in height. It has globular fruits. It probably originated in China but is now grown in Bangladesh and India, and found spread across much of tropical Africa. It is also cultivated in the Amazon region of Brazil.

== Uses ==
Fibre made from C. capsularis is whiter and is considered to be of a higher quality than that made from C. olitorius. The fibre is extracted from the cut stems by retting in water, removing the soft tissue, curing the fibre and drying it. It is used for making sacks, bags, carpets, curtains, fabrics and paper. C. olitorius and C. capsularis are the main sources of jute. The world production is concentrated in India and Bangladesh, where the crop grows well in the Ganges and Brahmaputra floodplains and delta region.

The leaves and shoots of this plant are widely eaten in salads when young and are used as a cooked leafy vegetable when older. The leaves are dried and powdered to use as a thickener in soups or as a tea. The immature fruits are also eaten, raw or cooked.

The plant is also used in herbal medicine. The leaves have been used to increase appetite, as an aid to digestion, as a laxative and as a stimulant. An infusion of the leaves has been used to reduce fever, and the roots and leaves have been used against dysentery. The seeds contain a digoxin-like substance and are poisonous to both animals and insects.

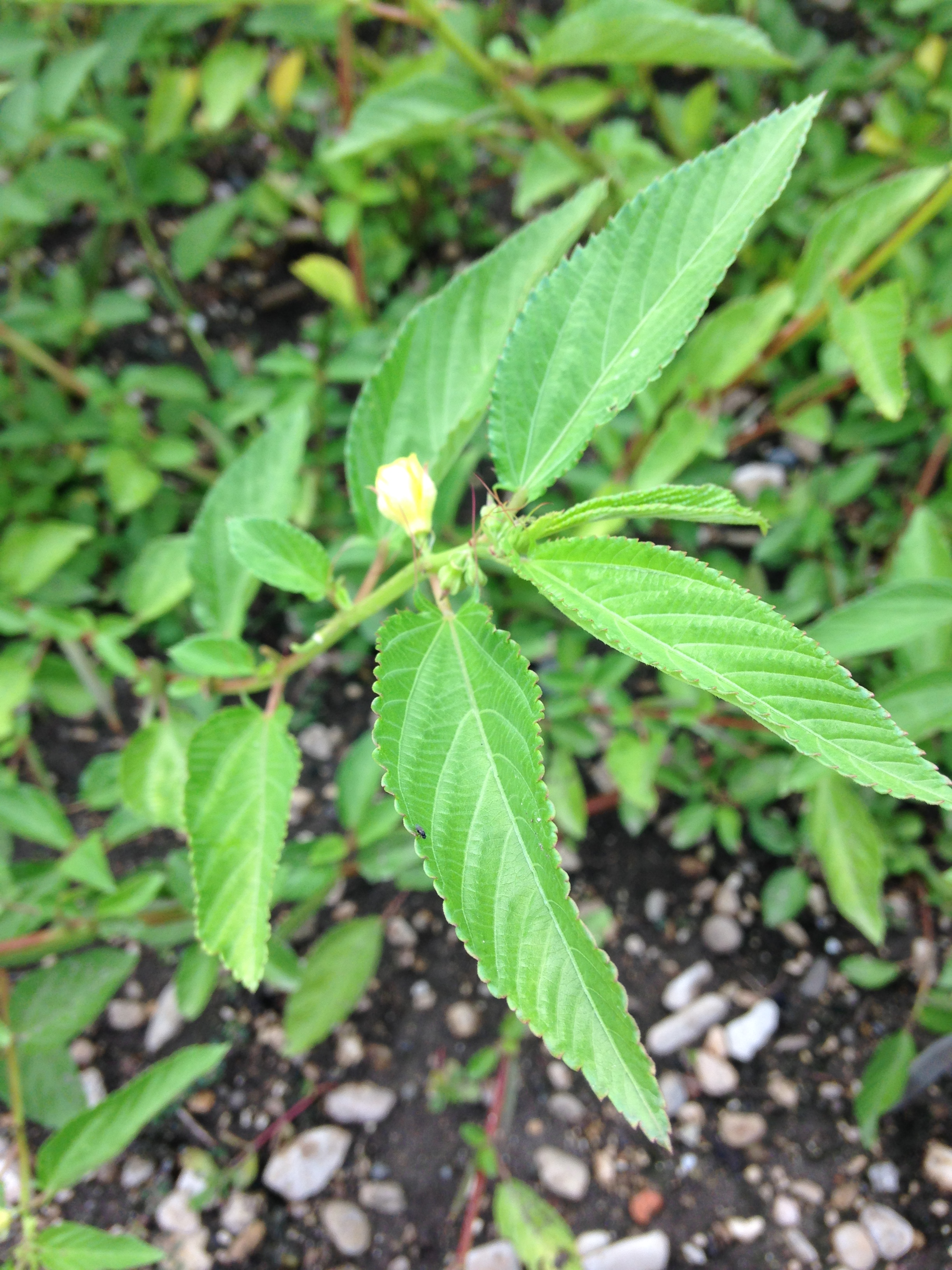
Stem top with leaves, flower buds and open flower

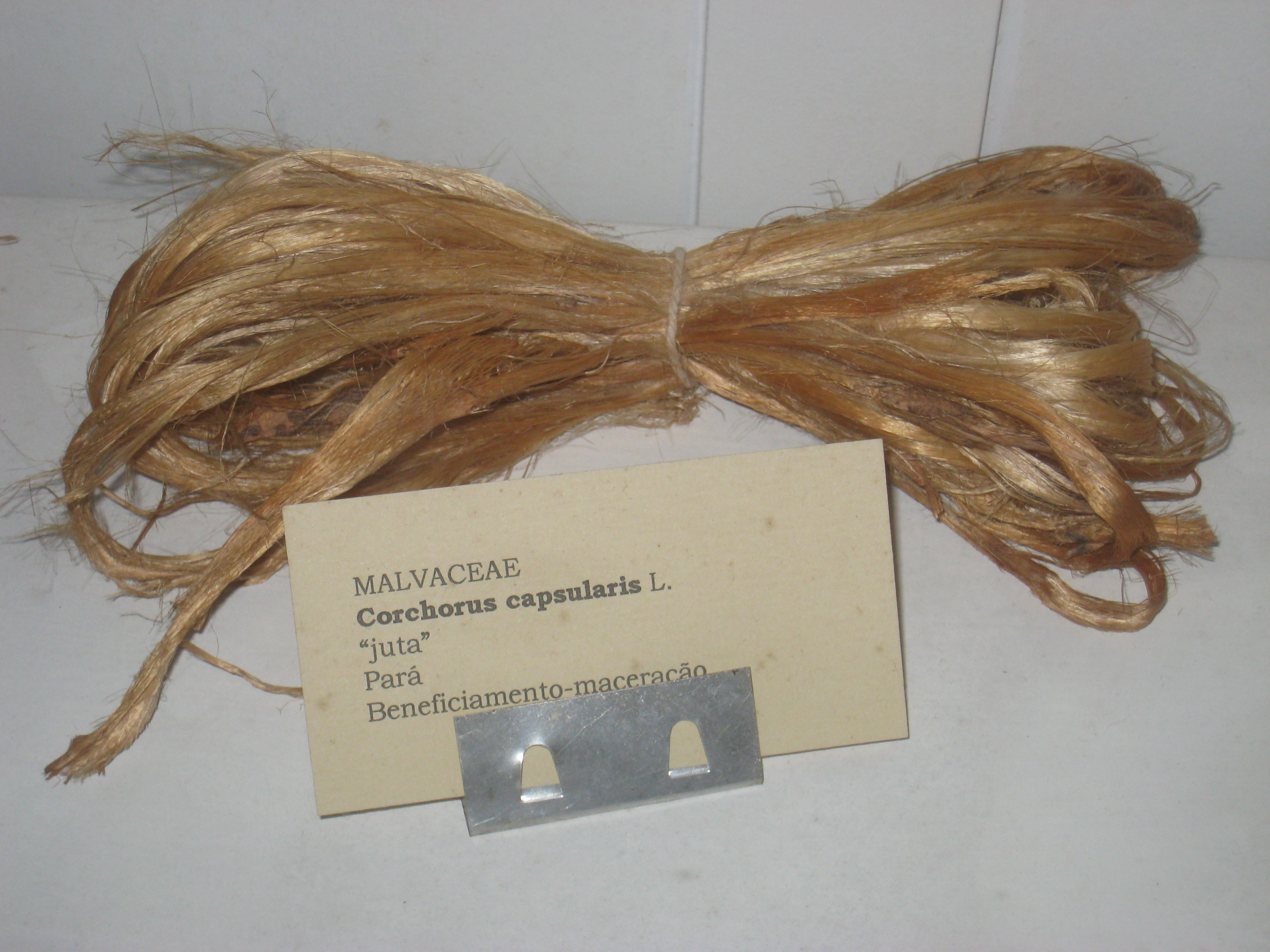
Hank of fibre

== See also ==
- Abutilon theophrasti
- Kenaf
- Mulukhiyah
