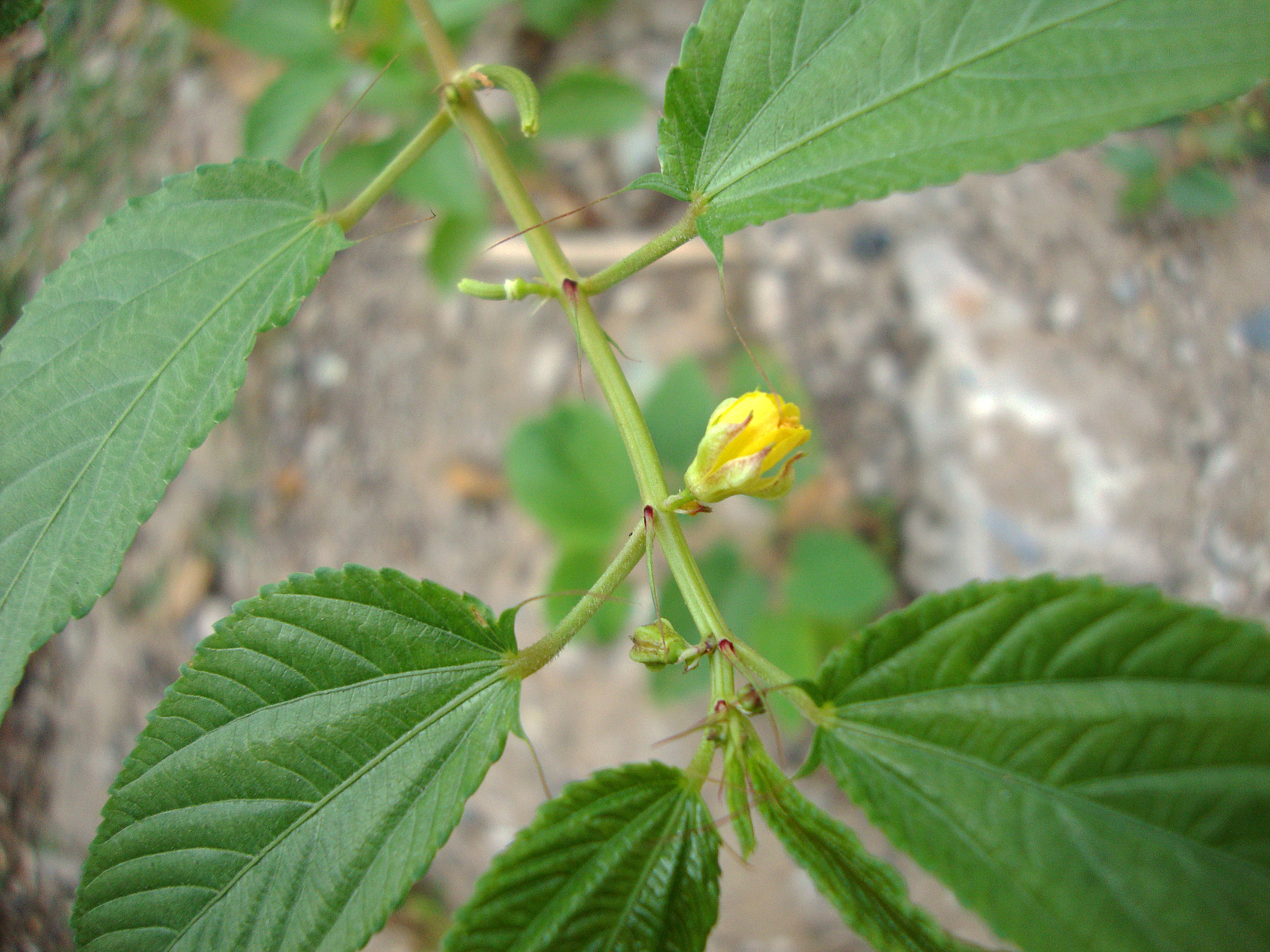

Scientific classification
- Kingdom: Plantae
- Clade: Embryophytes
- Clade: Tracheophytes
- Clade: Angiosperms
- Clade: Eudicots
- Clade: Rosids
- Order: Malvales
- Family: Malvaceae
- Genus: Corchorus
- Species: C. olitorius

Binomial name
- Corchorus olitorius L.

Synonyms
- Corchorus catharticus Blanco; Corchorus decemangularis Roxb. ex G.Don; Corchorus longicarpus G.Don; Corchorus malchairii De Wild.; Corchorus quinquelocularis Moench

= Corchorus olitorius =

Species of flowering plant

Jute mallow or Jew's mallow or Mallow leaves or Nalita jute (Corchorus olitorius, also known as "Jute leaves", "Tossa jute", "Mloukheyeh" "muteezi", "lunkomba", "ewedu", "saluyot", and "West African sorrel") is a species of shrub in the family Malvaceae. Together with C. capsularis it is the primary source of jute fiber. The leaves and young fruits are used as a vegetable, the dried leaves are used for tea and as a soup thickener, and the seeds are edible.

== Description ==
Corchorus olitorius is an erect herbaceous plant, slightly branched, and grows about 1.5 metres (5 ft) high. However if grown for fibre production it can reach 4 m (13 ft). The taproot leads to a sturdy and hairless stem, which is green with a faint reddish-brown hue and sometimes turns a little woody at ground level. The serrate acute leaves alternate and are 6 to 10 centimetres (2 1/4 to 4 in) long and 2 to 4 cm wide. The plant carries flowers singly or in two-flowered cymes opposite the leaf. The flowers grow at the end of a short stem and have 5 sepals, 5 petals and 10 free yellow stamens. The fruit is spindle-shaped, dehiscent and divided into transversal sections through five valves. The fruit measures 2 to 8 cm in length and colors vary from greyish-blue to green or brownish-black. Every seed chamber contains 25 to 40 seeds, totalling 125 to 200 seeds per fruit.

== Origin ==
It is unclear whether C. olitorius originated in Africa or in Asia. Some authorities consider that it comes from the Indo-Burmese area or from India, along with several other related species. Others point out that there is a greater genetic variation in Africa and a larger number of wild species in the genus Corchorus. Wherever it originated, it has been under cultivation for a very long time on both continents and probably grows, wild or as a crop, in every country in tropical Africa.

== Cultivation ==
Corchorus olitorius is an annual crop. The plant grows well in the lowland tropics, ranging from warm temperate zones through tropical desert to wet forest zones. It can tolerate( annual precipitation between 400 and 4290 mm (optimum 1000 mm per year). Some cultivars are sensitive to waterlogging, especially when young. Temperatures between 16.8 and 27.5 °C are optimal for growth. For the soil a pH of 4.5 to 8.2 is needed. The plant prefers a fertile, humus-rich, well-drained alluvial soil but also grows well in suboptimal soil conditions. Before sowing the soil is prepared carefully by plowing and the seeds are broadcast or dribbled behind the plow in the wet season. Twenty-four hours before sowing the seeds must be soaked for ten seconds in hot water (around 93 °C) to overcome dormancy. If the small seeds are mixed with sand, it makes it easier to sow them. And if the soil is wet, germination takes place two to three days after sowing. In some systems the seedlings are transplanted at a height of 10 cm. The plants are grown in rows with a spacing of 20–50 cm. When the plant achieves a height of 8–25 cm, the seedlings are harrowed with a rake three to four times and weeded two to three times. Cow dung, wood ashes or rotted water hyacinth (Eichhornia crassipes) or its ashes are used as manure. The yield of the crop responds more to water availability and soil organic matter than to high mineral nutrient status.

=== Pests and diseases ===
The most serious pests are nematodes from the genus Meloidogyne, leaf-eating beetles and caterpillars. If it is dry, eight to ten weeks after planting, yield losses can occur due to leaf bugs and spider mites attacks resulting in terminal shoot wilt. Damage by nematodes can be minimized by crop rotation. Application of insecticides is also possible, but agent and application time should be chosen carefully since the leaves are harvested for consumption. Attacks were also observed by weevils species (Myllocerus spp.), semilooper (Anomis sabulifera), and yellow mites (Polyphagotarsonemus latus). Diseases (bacterial and viruses infections) are not as serious as pests (insect and nematode attacks). Seedling damp-off occurs but can be reduced by good drainage and cultivation in humus-rich soils with adequate water holding capacity. Attacks by Sclerotium rolfsii in dry weather of the late season can lead to wilts at the stem collar. Anthracnose spots caused by Colletotrichum gloeosporioides may infect the crop but can be easily controlled by spraying copper oxychloride.

=== Harvest and yield performance ===
Harvest can begin after about six weeks: The whole plant can be directly harvested (for jute production) or leaves are harvested by pruning several times during the vegetation period (for food production). The shoot regeneration highly depends on variety, soil fertility, adequate water supply and control of weeds and pests. Amount of pruned shoots and quality reduces with each harvest. Under farming conditions the yield usually reaches around 2.5 t per hectare of edible leaves. Under experimental conditions and with very high fertilizer application, yields of about 28 t per hectare have been reported.

=== Post harvest and propagation ===
For fresh consumption the leaves should be stored above 8 °C (46 °F) and below 15 °C (59 °F). Low temperatures from 1 to 8 °C (34 to 46 °F) lead to browning of the leaves and too high storage temperatures are manifested in leaf yellowing. To produce seeds, the fruits can be harvested six weeks after flowering. The dried capsules are threshed and can be stored for eight to twelve months in well sealed jars. For storage, the moisture should be around nine percent.

=== Biochemistry ===
==== Leaves ====
Leaves of Corchorus olitorius are mainly known to have rich sources of many chemical compounds. There are 17 active nutrients compounds in jute leaves including protein, fat, carbohydrate, fiber, ash, calcium, potassium, iron, sodium, phosphorus, beta-carotene, thiamine, riboflavin, niacin and ascorbic acid.

==== Seeds ====
According to a comparative analysis of major nutrients of Corchorus olitorius seeds showed that the protein content of the Corchorus olitorius has significantly increased after seed germination process where the sugar level has decreased in the studied seeds. It can be seen from this study that the level of nutrients in the Corchorus olitorius seed changes during the germination process.

=== Future prospects ===
C. olitorius could be grown in a floating system with nutrient solution and could produce baby leaves, which would be interesting for the fresh cut leafy vegetable industry in Europe.

== Uses ==
=== Fibre and textile use ===
Jute fibre is made from the bark tissue of C. olitorius and C. capsularis, especially in South Asian countries, though fibre made from C. olitorius is considered to be of lesser quality. Finished fibres appear golden and silky with a length of up to 3 m and with a diameter of 2.4 μm. The plant stalk is cut and then processed by pulling up, rippling, partial retting, breaking, spinning and combing to obtain fine fibres that are well separated from unwanted woody material. Afterwards the fibres are cured and dried.

Many textiles are made of jute, such as yarn, twine, sacking, carpet backing cloth and other blended textiles. It is also used as raw material for cords and strings.

In Africa and the Middle East, a different type is grown with the leaves and shoots being used for food while the fibre is considered of little importance.

=== Culinary use ===
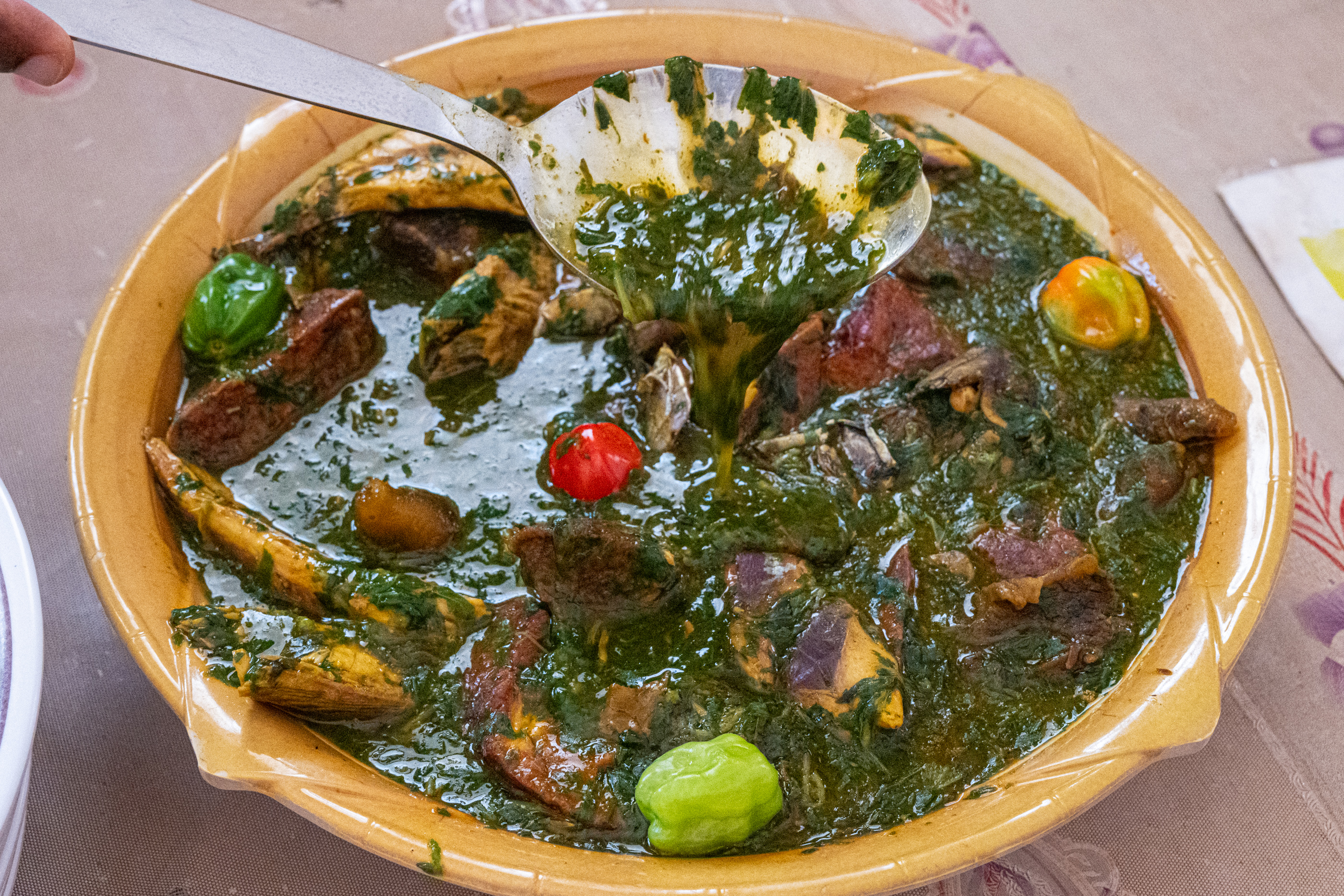
A spoonful of ninnouwi ('Corchorus olitorius'), a jute mallow stew served in a restaurant in Natitingou, Benin.

C. olitorius is cultivated in Syria, Lebanon, Palestine, Tunisia, Sudan and Egypt as a potherb and its culinary use goes back at least as far as the Ancient Egyptians. It is an important leafy vegetable in Togo, Côte d'Ivoire, Benin, Liberia, Nigeria, Ghana, Cameroon, Sudan, Uganda, Kenya, Zambia and Zimbabwe. It is also cultivated and eaten in the Caribbean and Brazil, in the Middle East and in India, Bangladesh, Japan and China. Its leaves are a special favourite of the Boros of northeast India, who make a mucilaginous preparation with its dried leaves mixed with fatty pork and lye called narji.

In Nigeria and Zambia the leaves are boiled to make a sticky, mucilaginous sauce which is served with balls of cassava (served with nshima in Zambia) which are otherwise rather dry. In Vietnamese cuisine it known as rau đay and made into a soup with shrimp. In the Philippines it is known as saluyot and the young leaves are cooked in soups and stews, like Dinengdeng and Bulanglang. In Egypt, Sudan and Palestine mulukhiyah is a dish made from the boiled leaves. In Tunisia the leaves are turned into powder and cooked with beef or lamb.

==== Nutrition ====
The edible part of jute is its leaves. Richness in potassium, vitamin B6, iron, vitamin A and vitamin C make this crop particularly important where people cover a high share of their energy requirement by micronutrient-poor staple crops. This vegetable is predominantly eaten in Africa and Asia. A traditional Lebanese, Tunisian, Cypriot, Jordanian, Syrian, Palestinian and Egyptian dish made of C. olitorius leaves is mulukhiyah.

==== Medicinal aspects ====
Consumption of the leaves is reported to be demulcent, deobstruent, diuretic, lactagogue, purgative and tonic. It is also a folk remedy for aches and pains, dysentery, enteritis, fever, pectoral pains and tumors. Ayurvedics use the leaves for ascites, pain, piles, and tumors. Elsewhere the leaves are used for cystitis, dysuria, fever, and gonorrhea. The cold infusion is said to restore the appetite and strength. It can act as an anti-inflammatory, and it has gastroprotective properties.

=== Tobacco alternative ===
During the Gaza war, dried leaves of jute mallow (molokhia) were used as a substitute for tobacco amid severe cigarette shortages and soaring prices in the Gaza Strip. Traders and consumers dried and crumbled the leaves, often mixing them with liquid nicotine before rolling them into cigarettes. The practice emerged as an improvised response to Israeli restrictions on imports and the scarcity of conventional tobacco products, leading to the development of a small local market for molokhia-based cigarettes. Some users described the product as an unsatisfactory substitute for tobacco, while others expressed concerns about the safety of unregulated additives used in its preparation. Some medical professionals in Gaza have warned against this use as its effects are largely unstudied. Several doctors in Gaza also reported cases of suffocation caused by this substance.

== In culture ==
In classical antiquity, Pliny recorded that jute plants were used as food in ancient Egypt. It may have also been cultivated by the Jews in the Near East, which gives the plant its name.

== Gallery ==
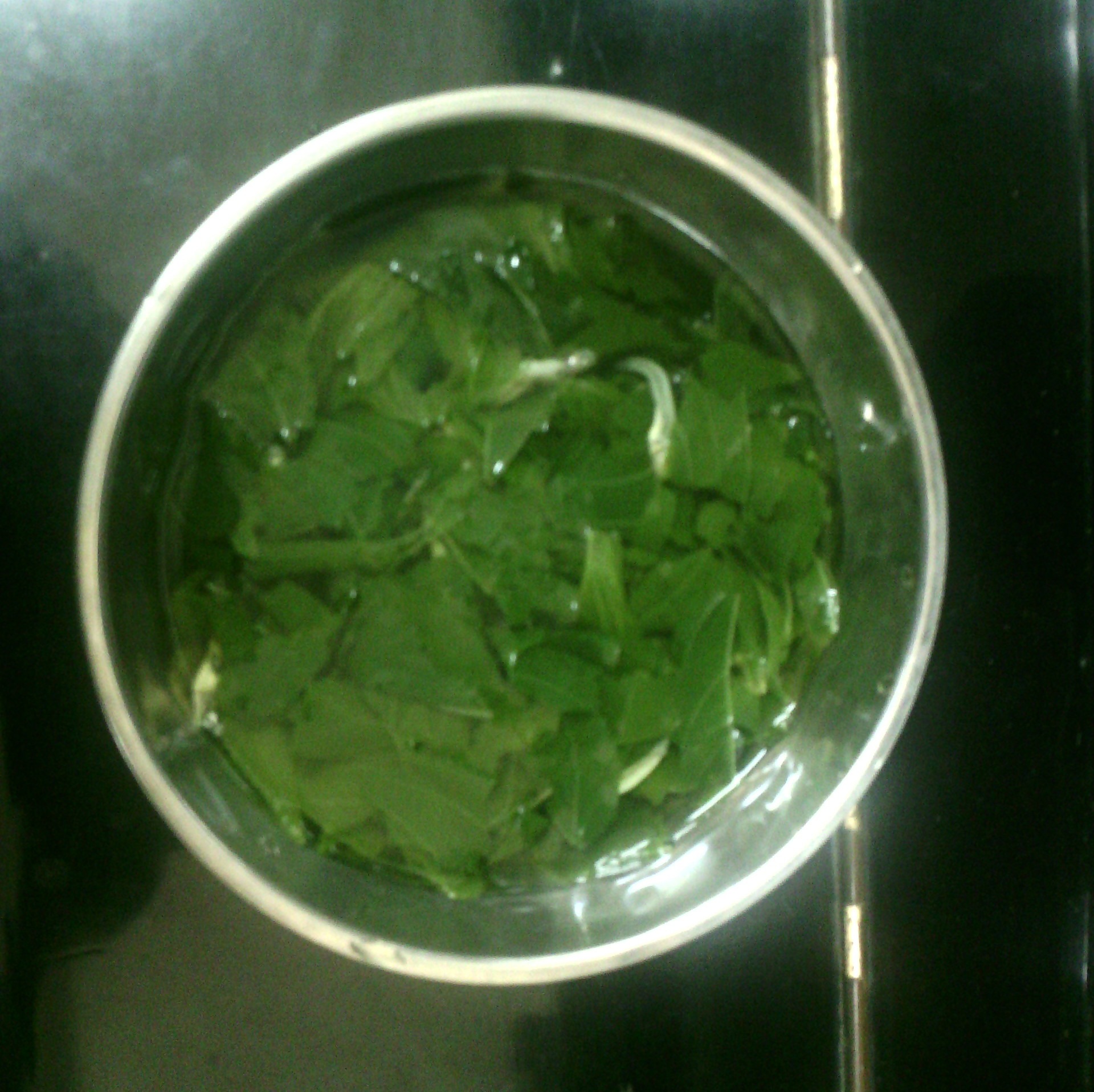
Young leaves of jute prepared by cooking in Taiwan

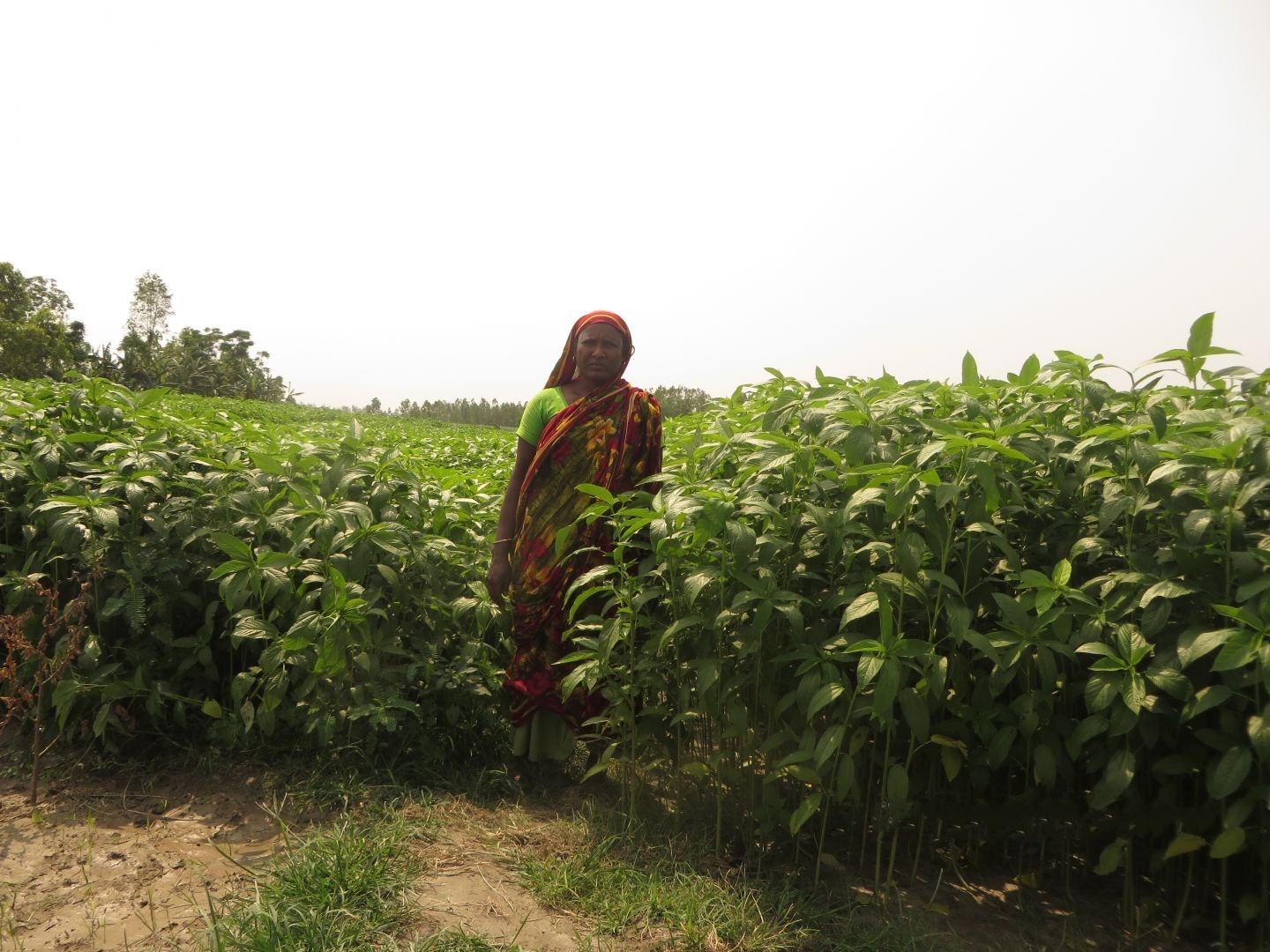
Jute field

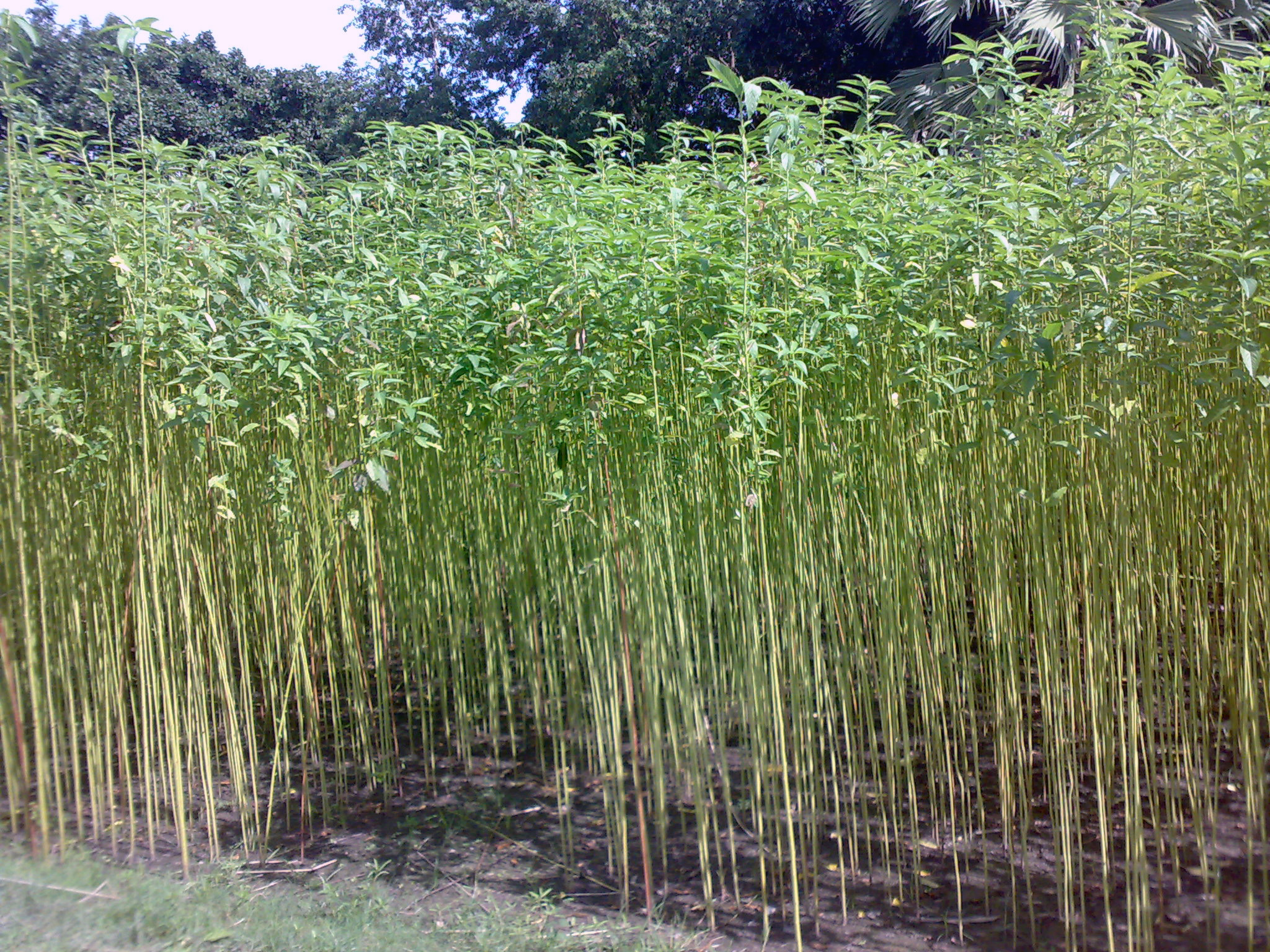
Jute plantation

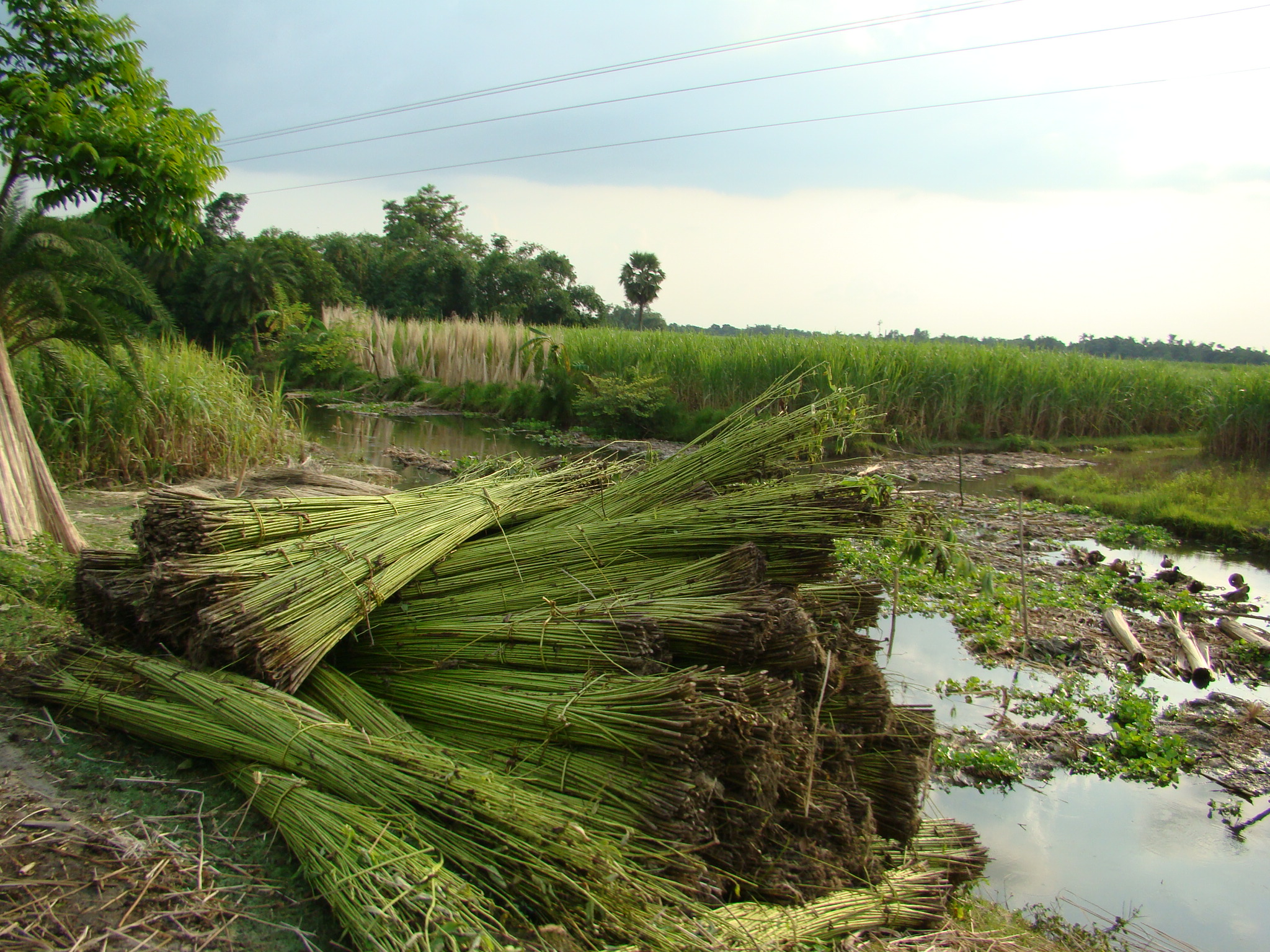
Cultivation and processing

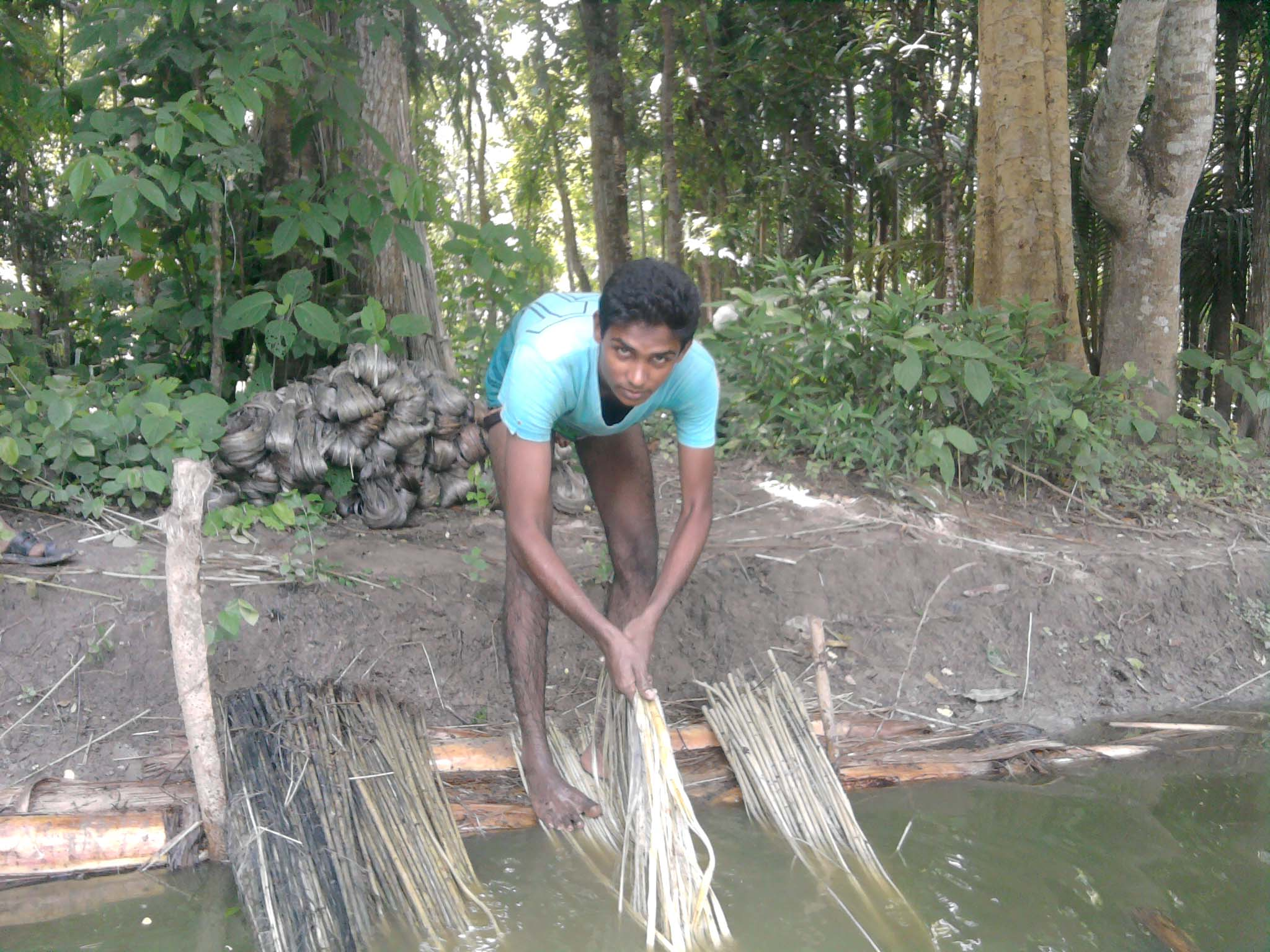
Retting

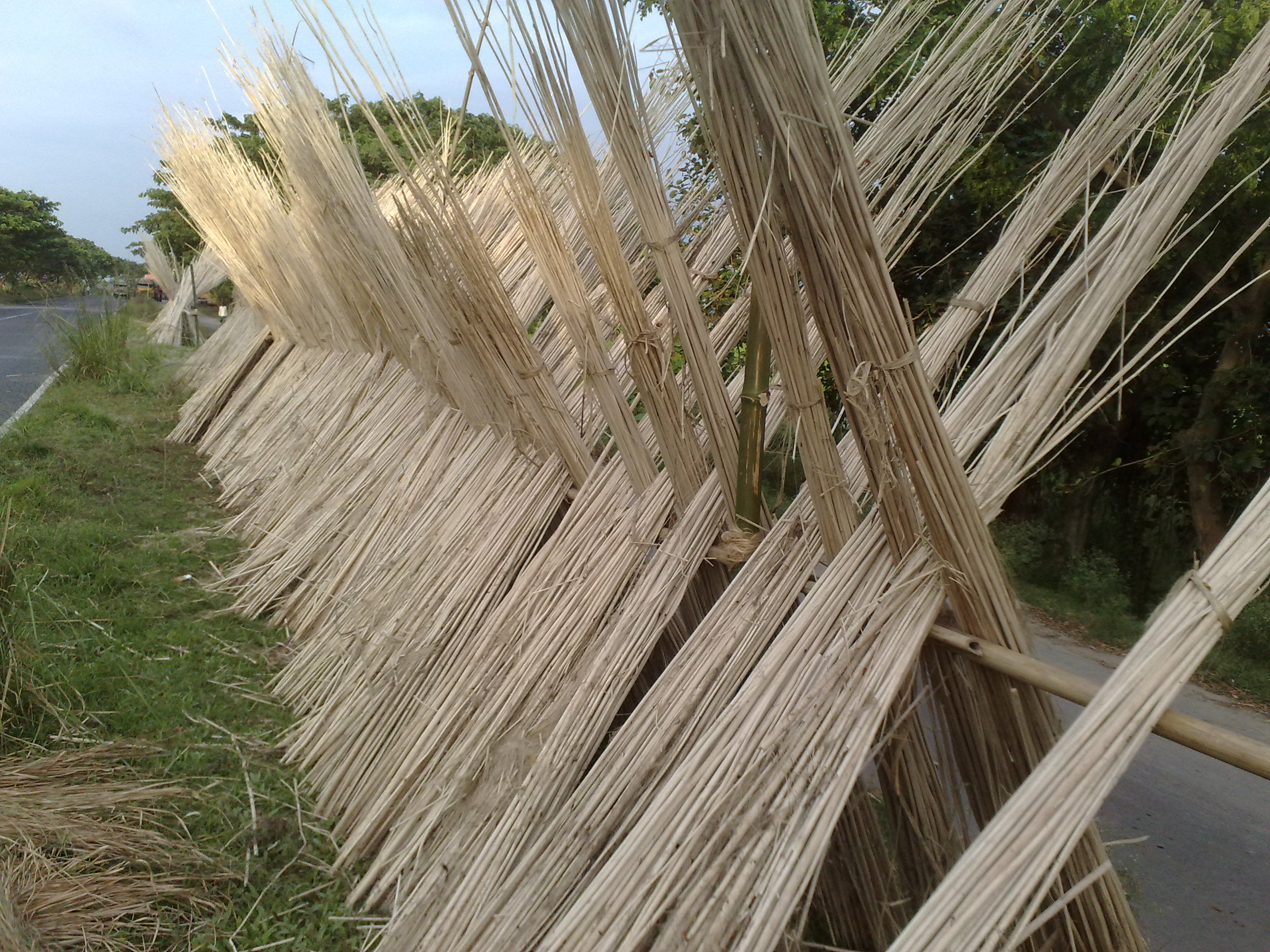
Drying the cane

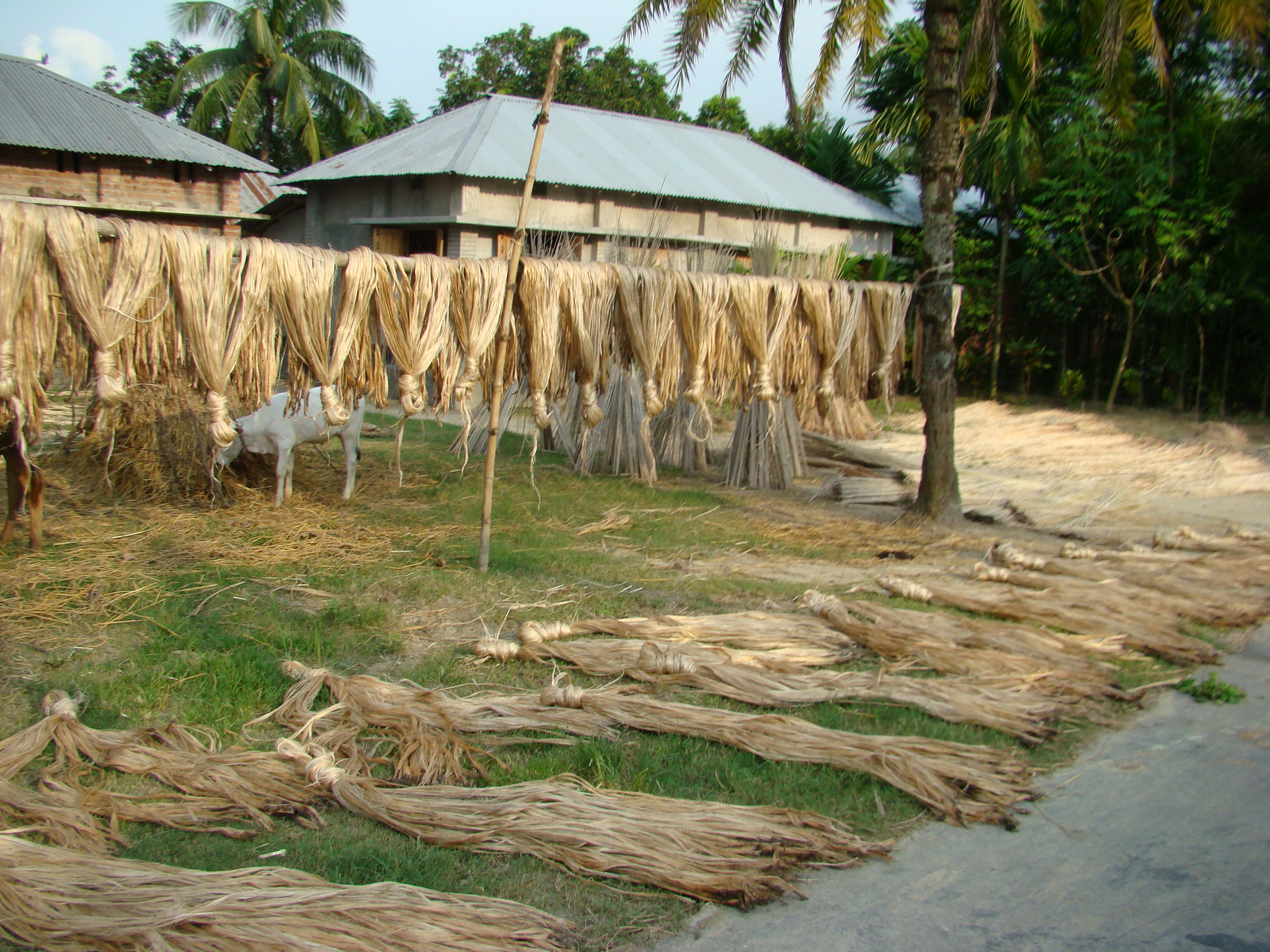
Drying hanks

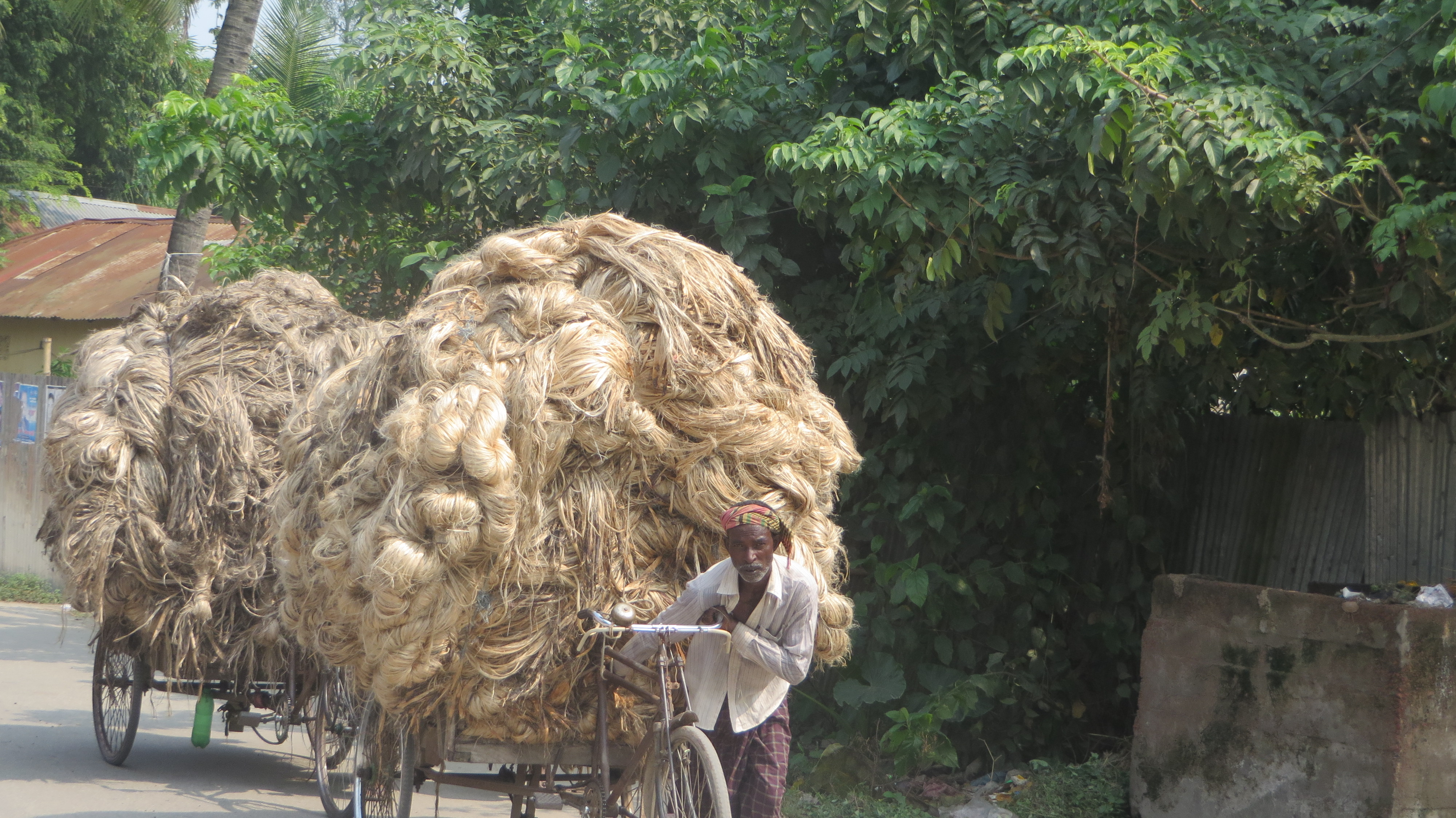
Transporting jute fibres by bicycle cart in Bangladesh

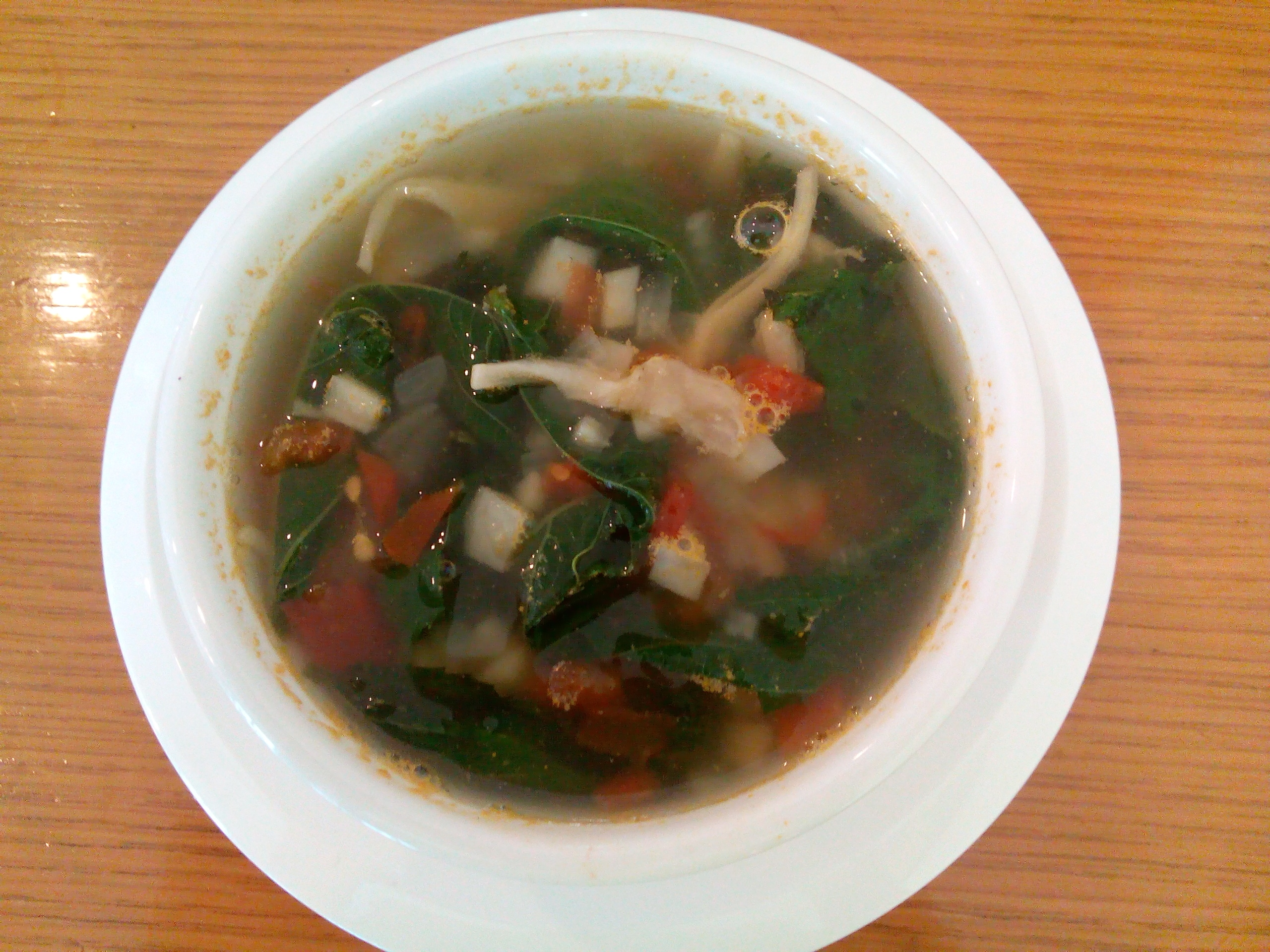
A soup containing mushroom and Corchorus olitorius leaves, served in Malolos, the Philippines, where the latter vegetable is known as saluyot.

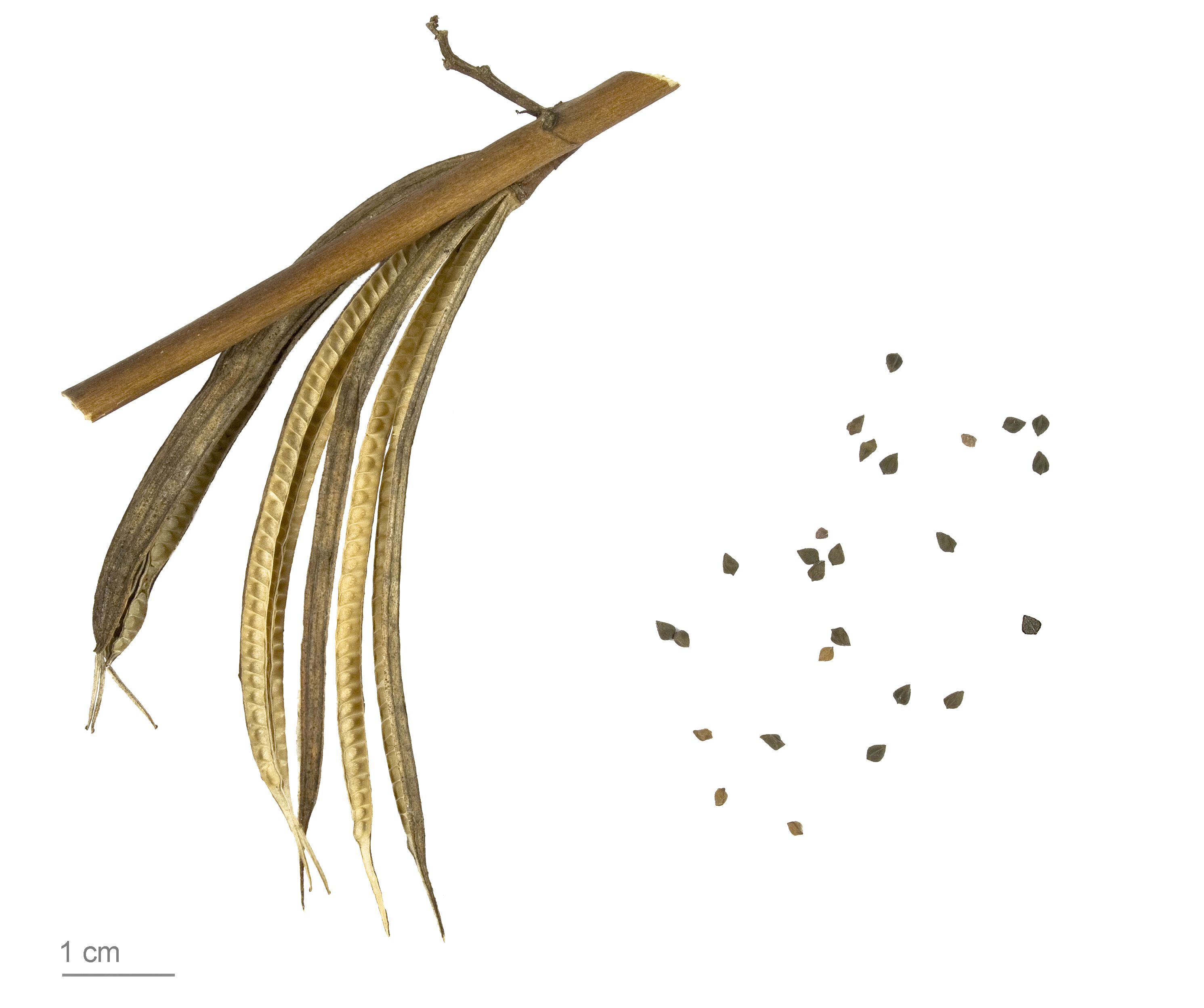
Fruits and seeds

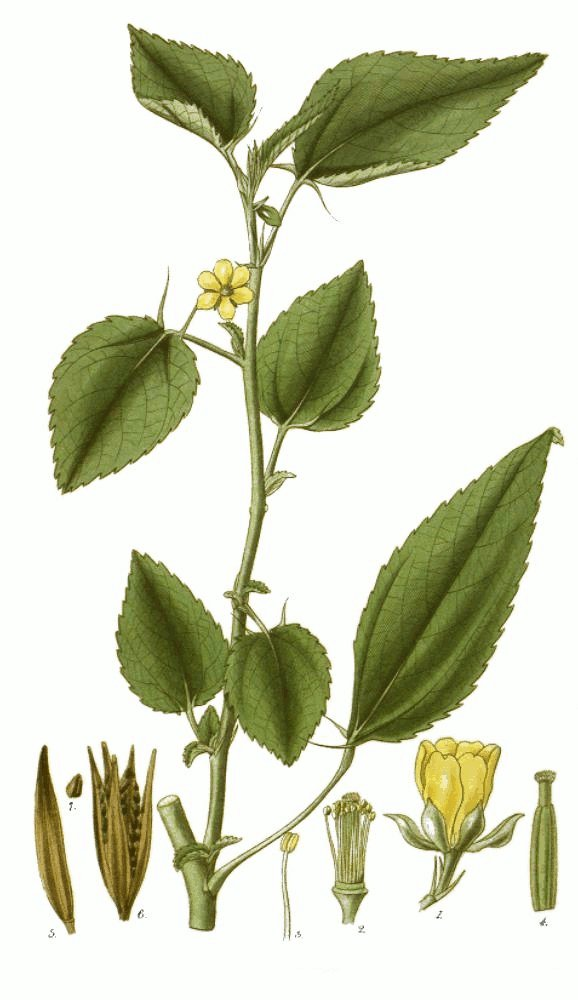
Botanical illustration of Corchorus olitorius

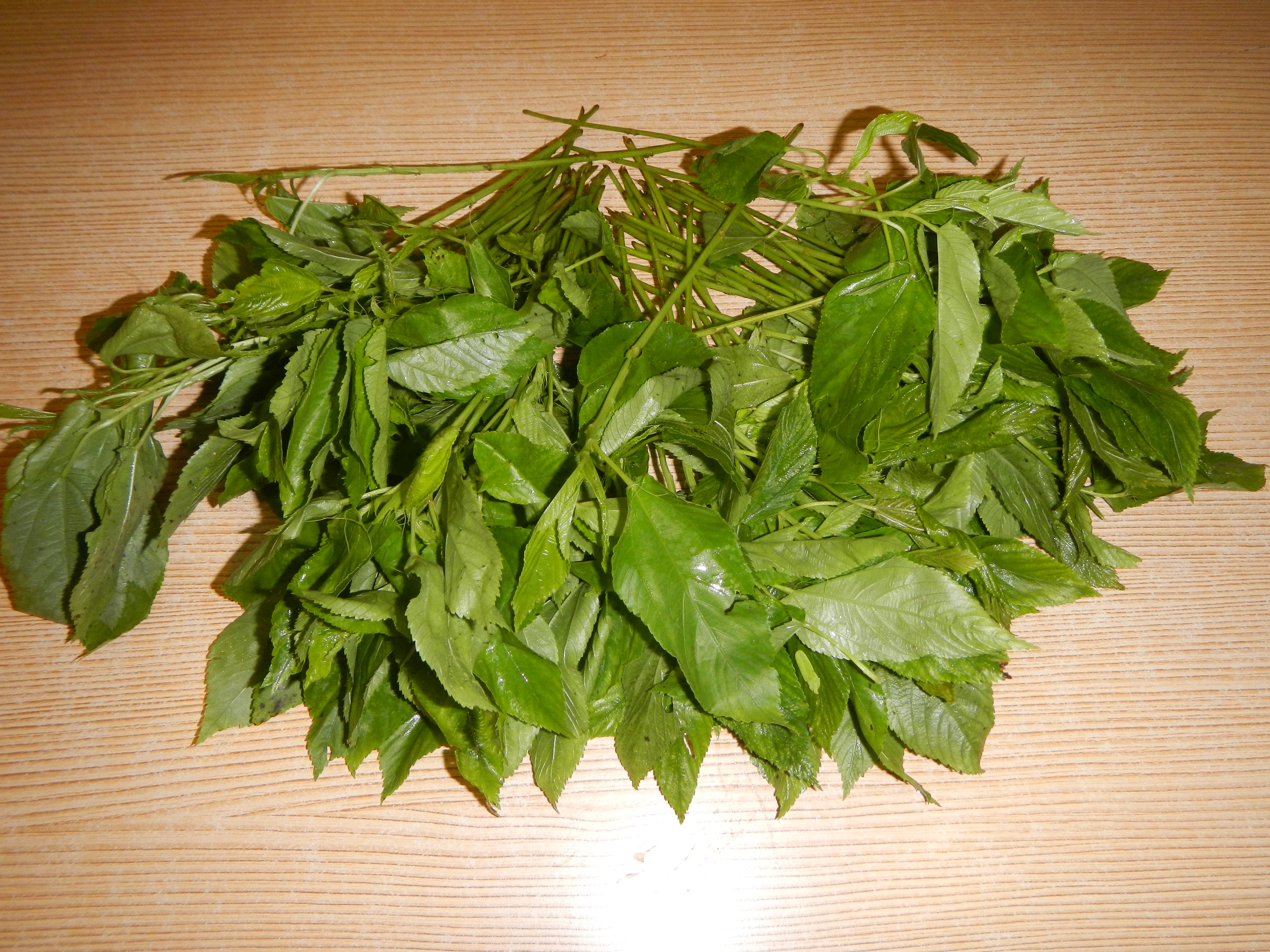
Edible leaves of Corchorus olitorius

== Botanical gallery ==
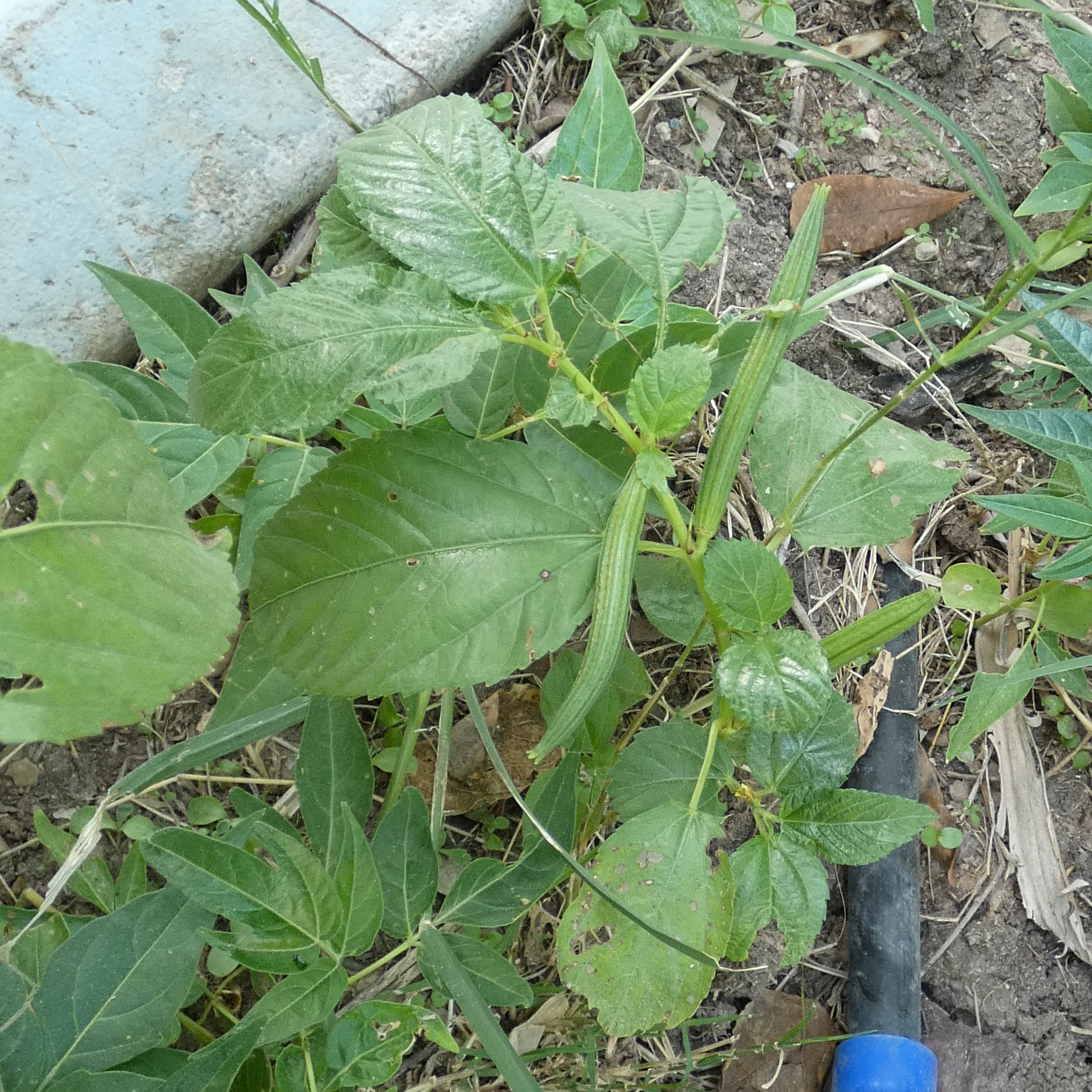
Whole plant with fruit

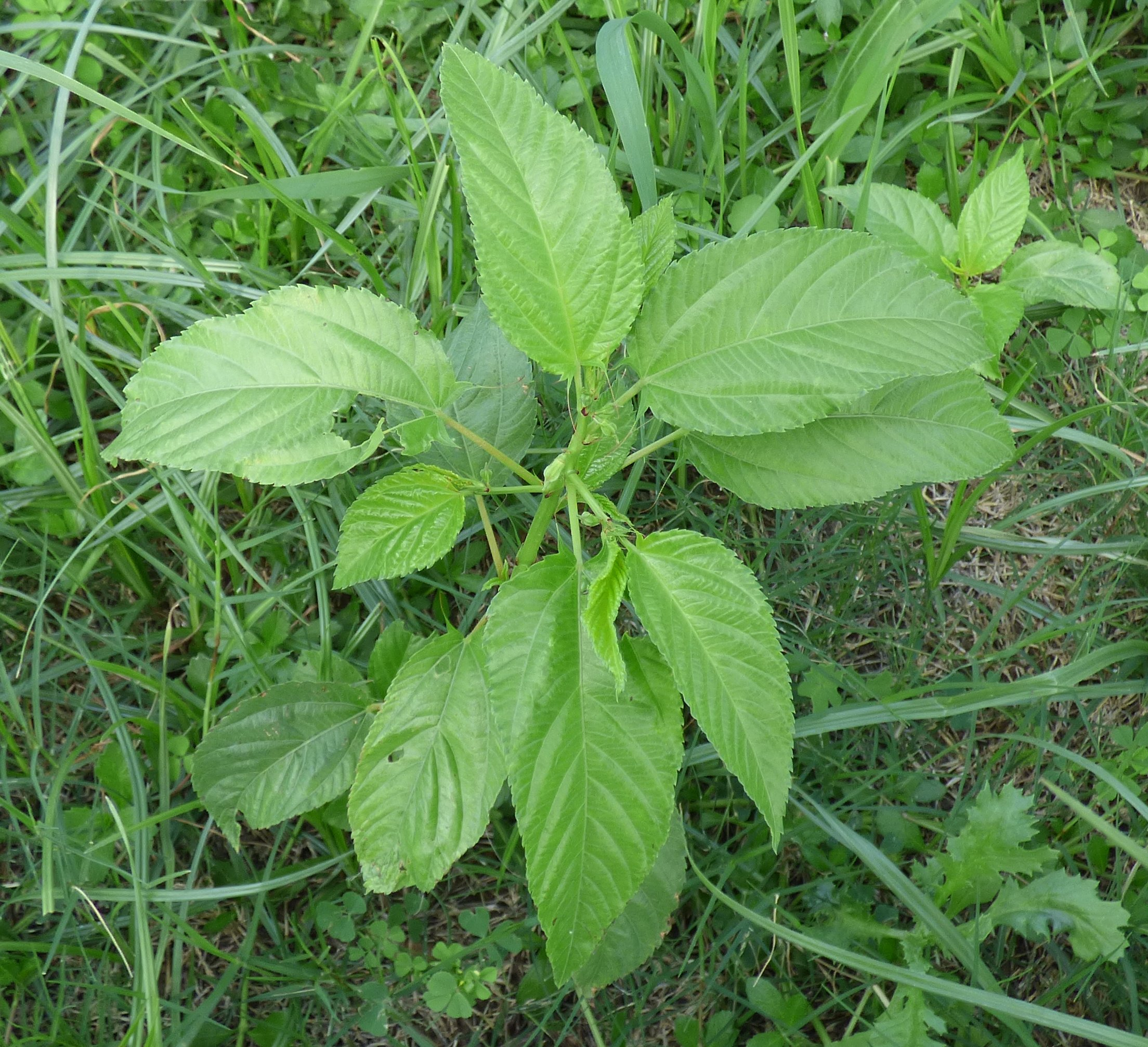
Leaf shape and texture

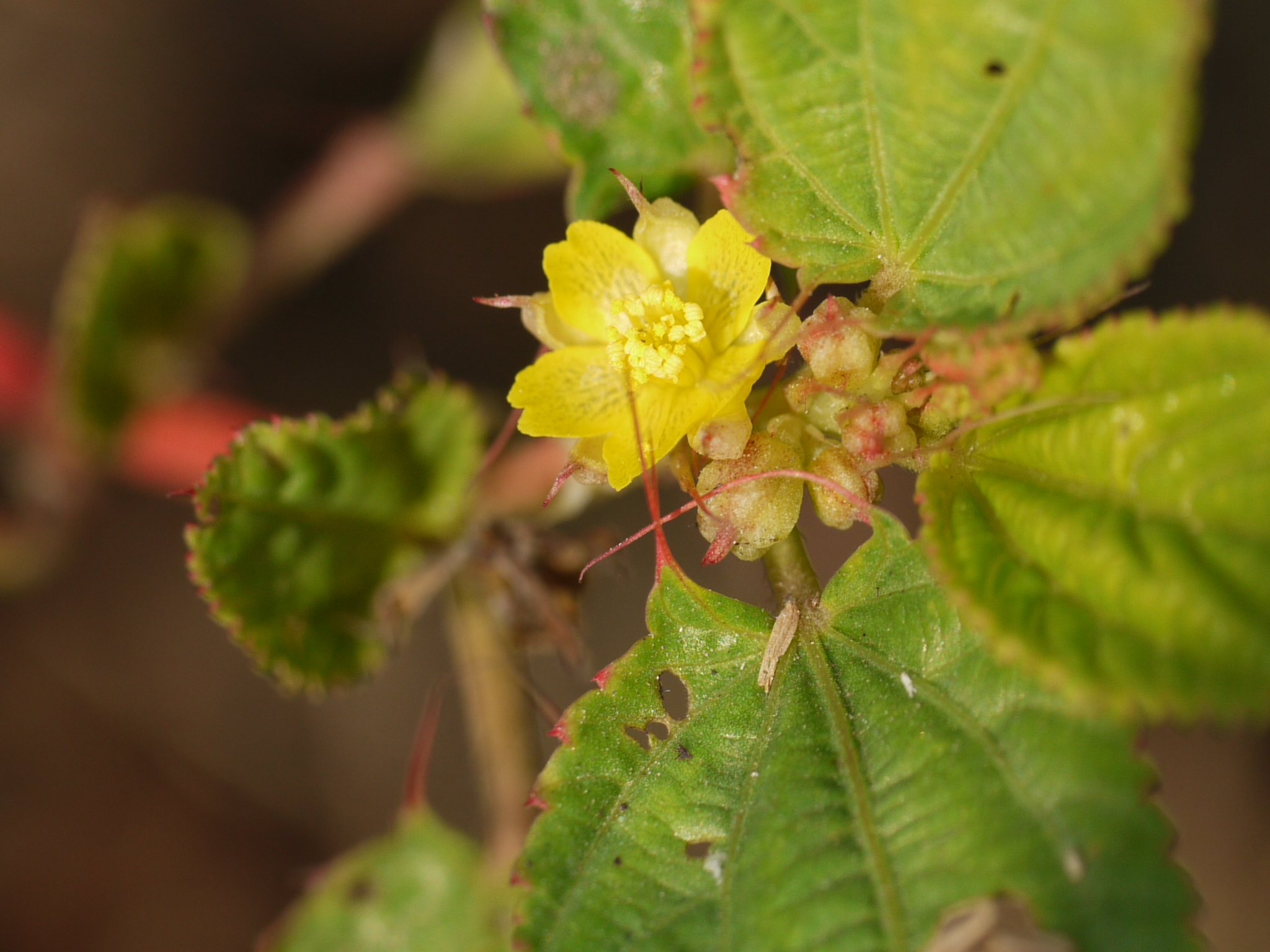
Flower, yellow or white

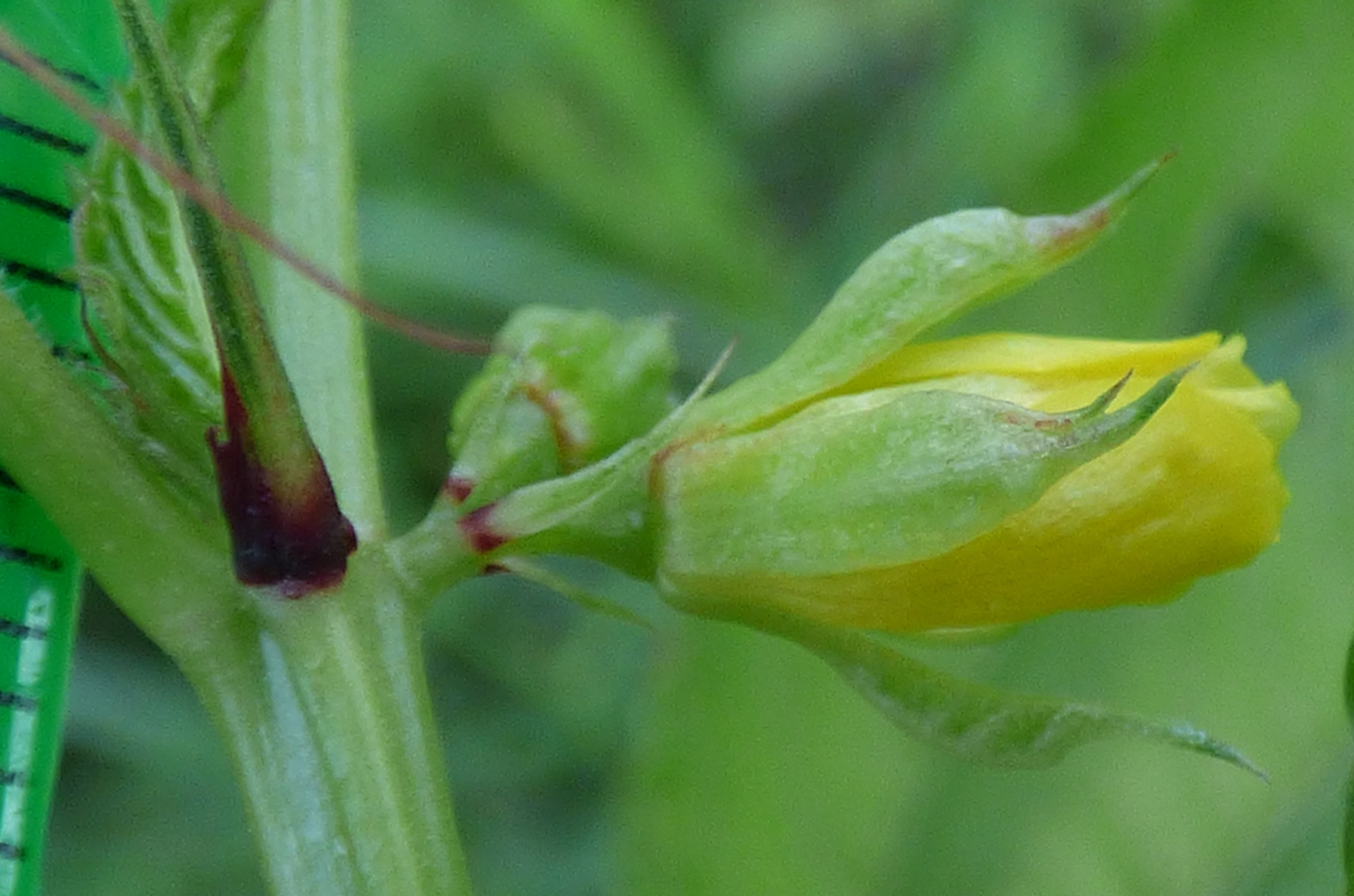
Pointed sepals, bracts at stalk base, no epicalyx

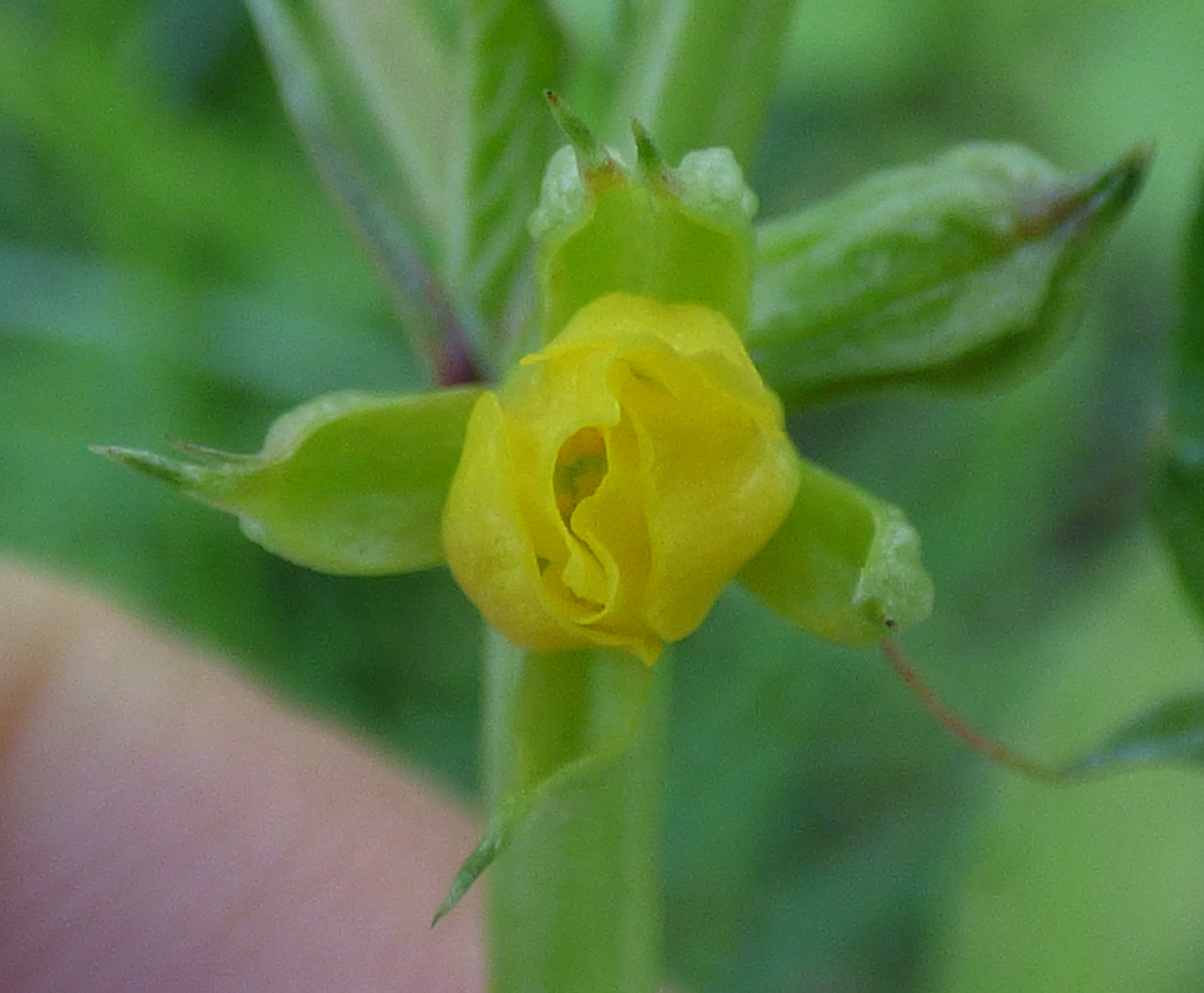
Pointed sepals, flowers yellow, may be white

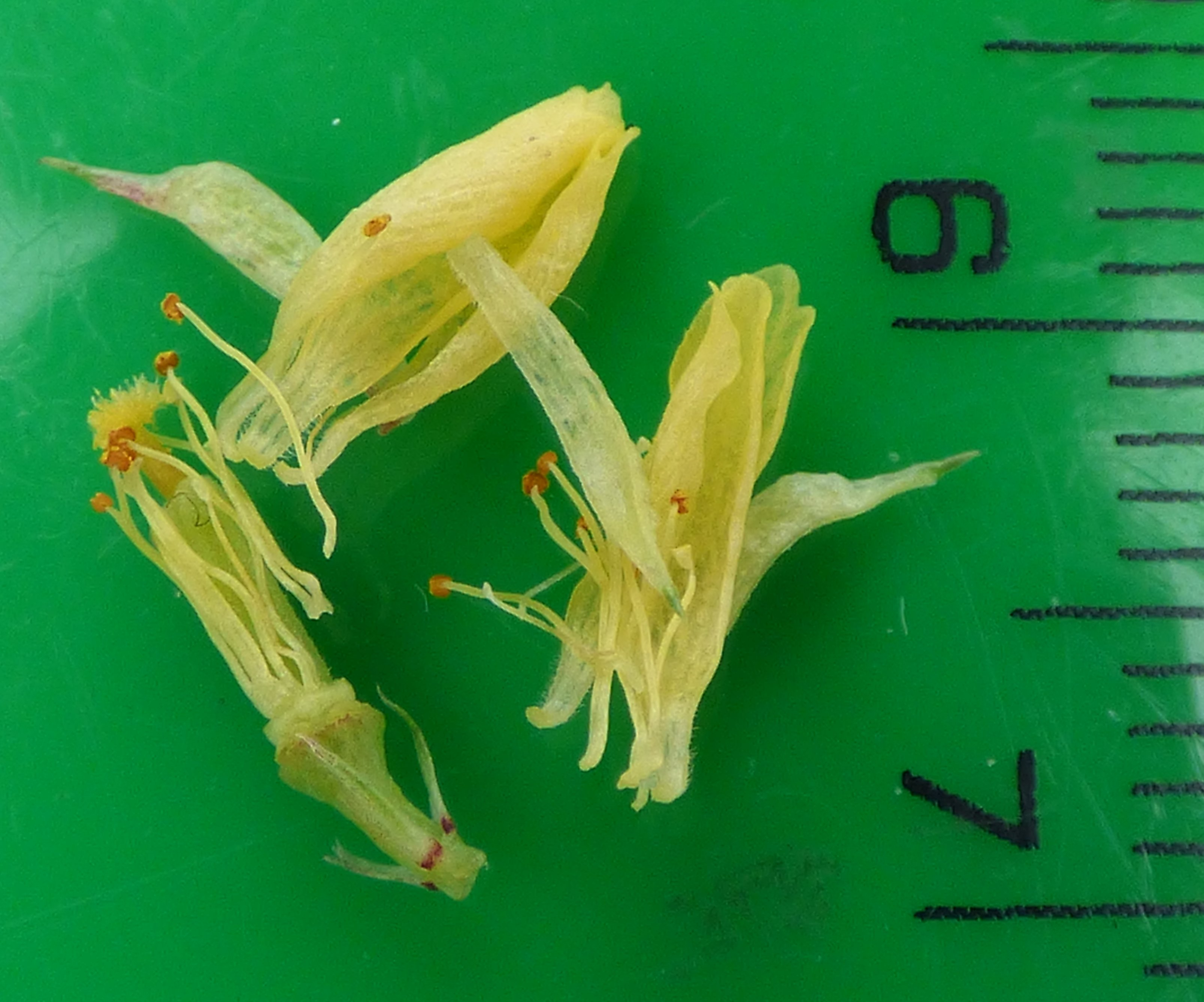
Many (20+) anthers

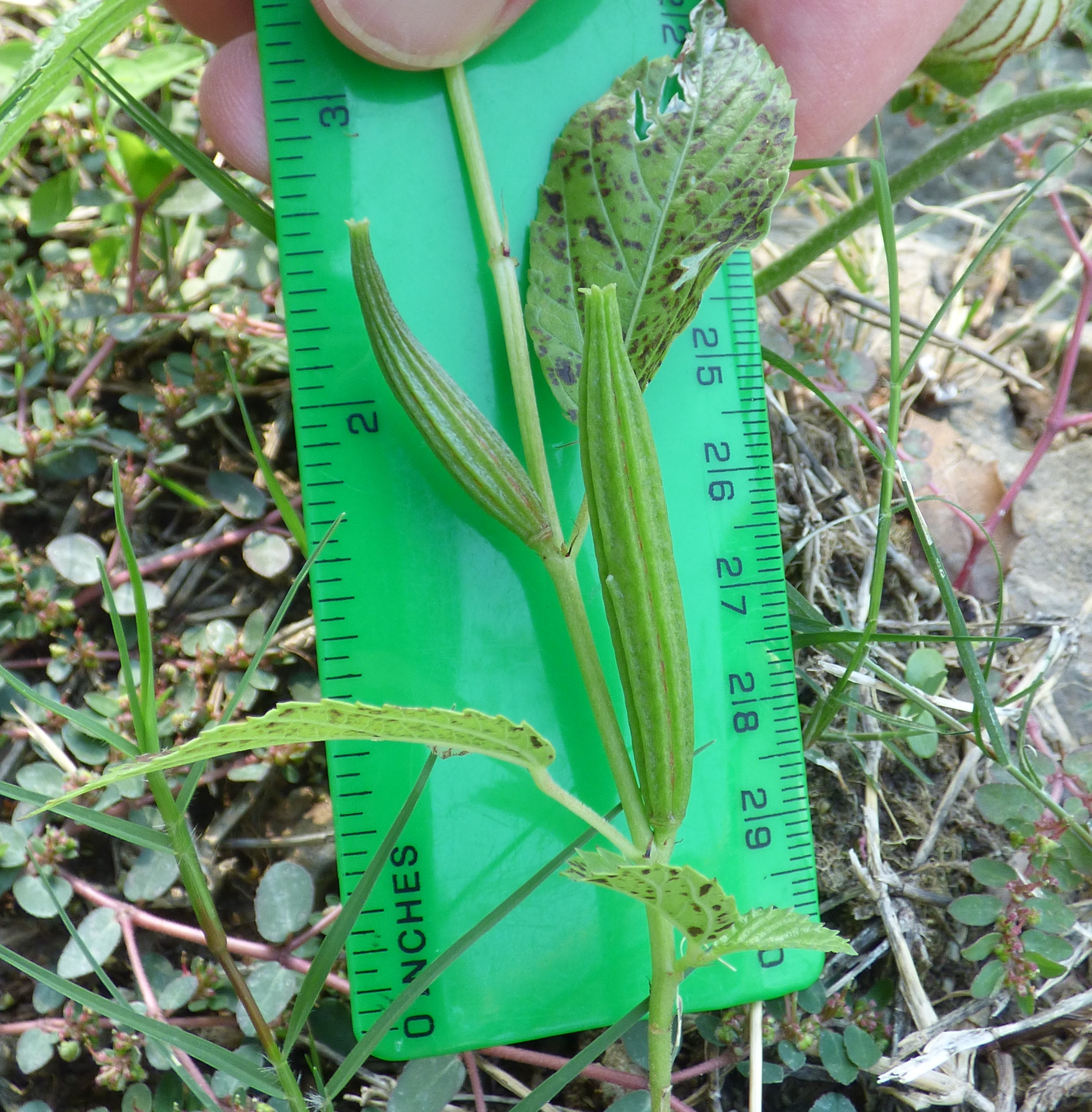
Fruit 10-edged (5 parts with sunken middles)

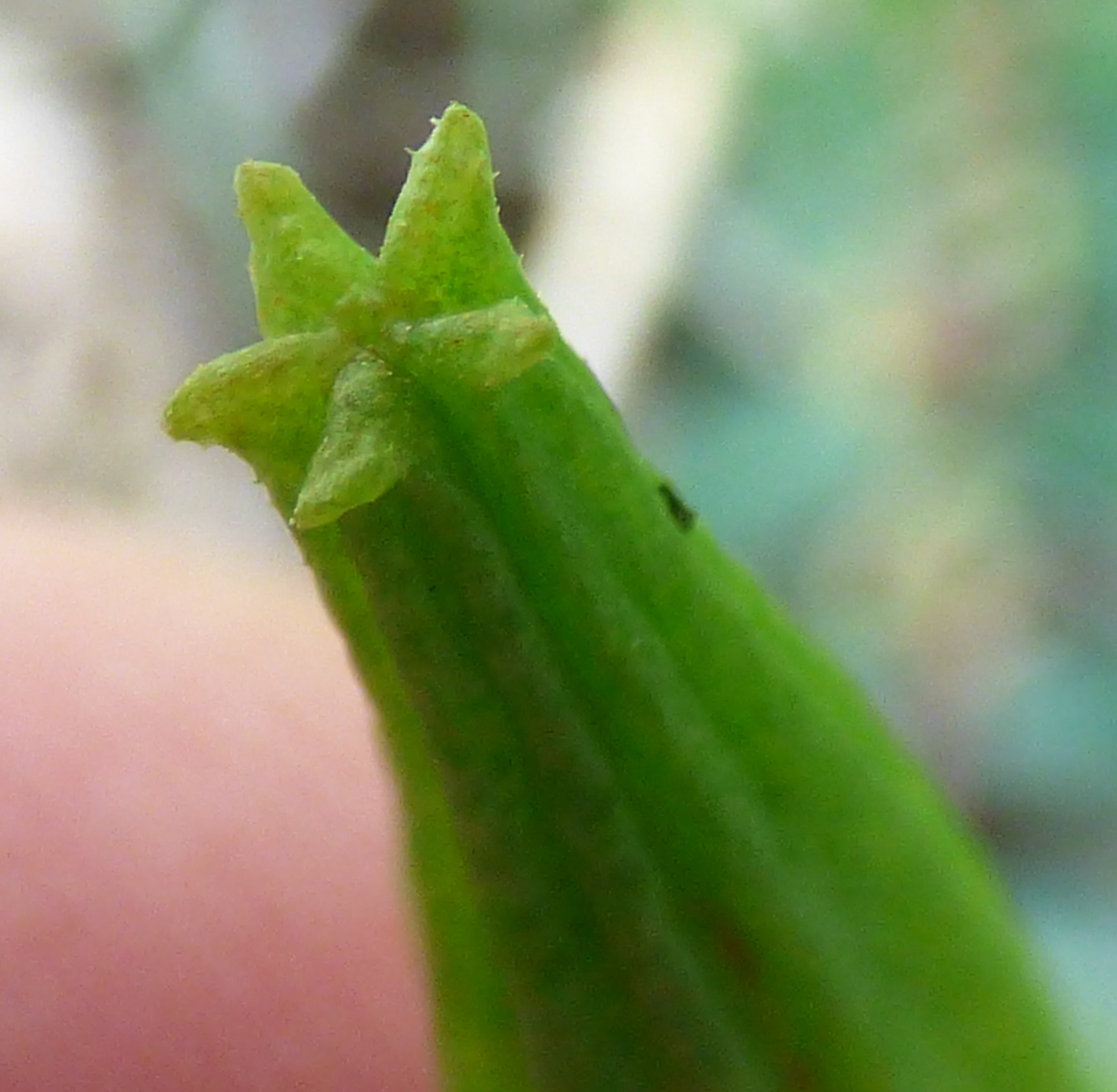
Fruit 5-tipped

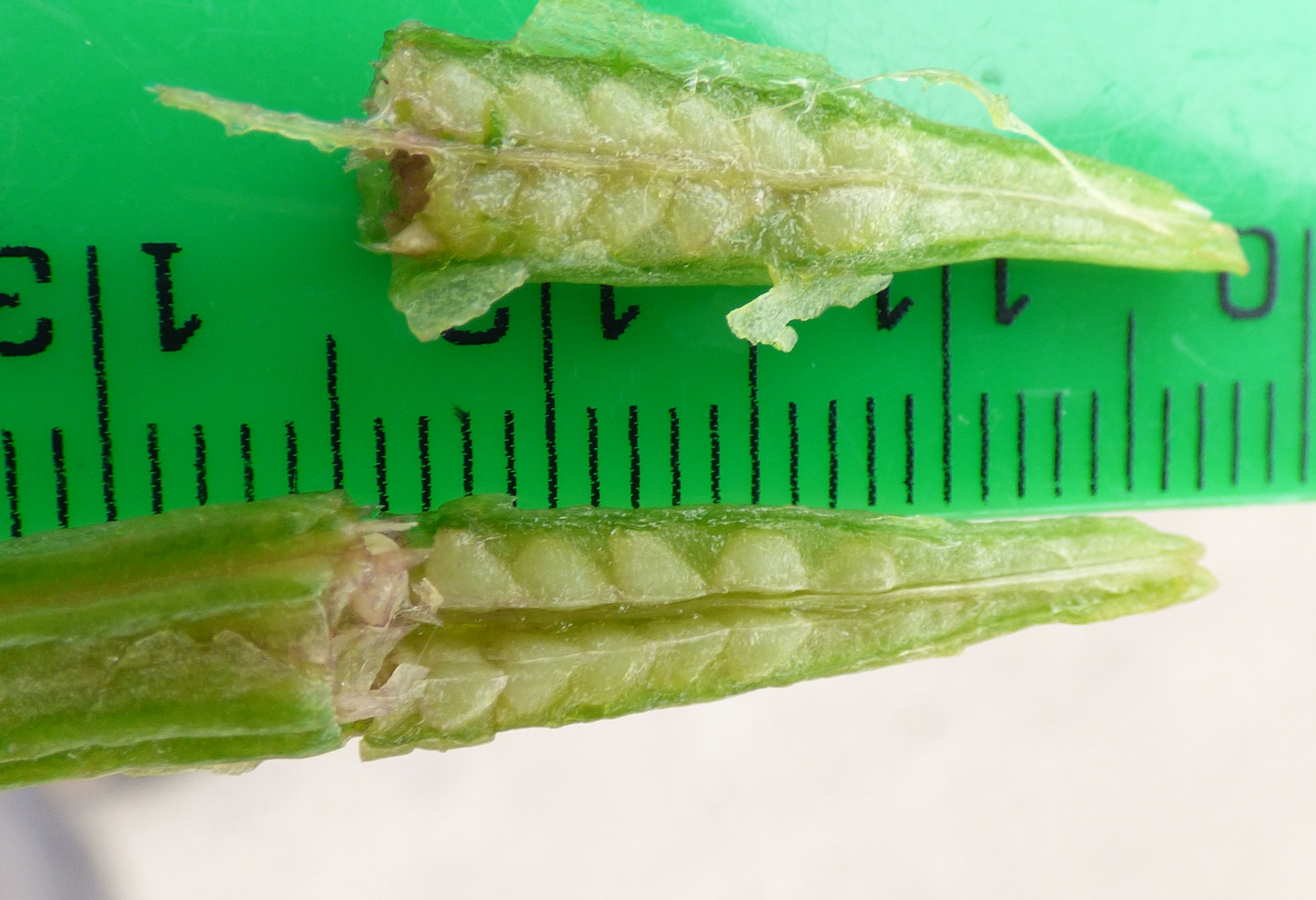
Immature seed arrangement

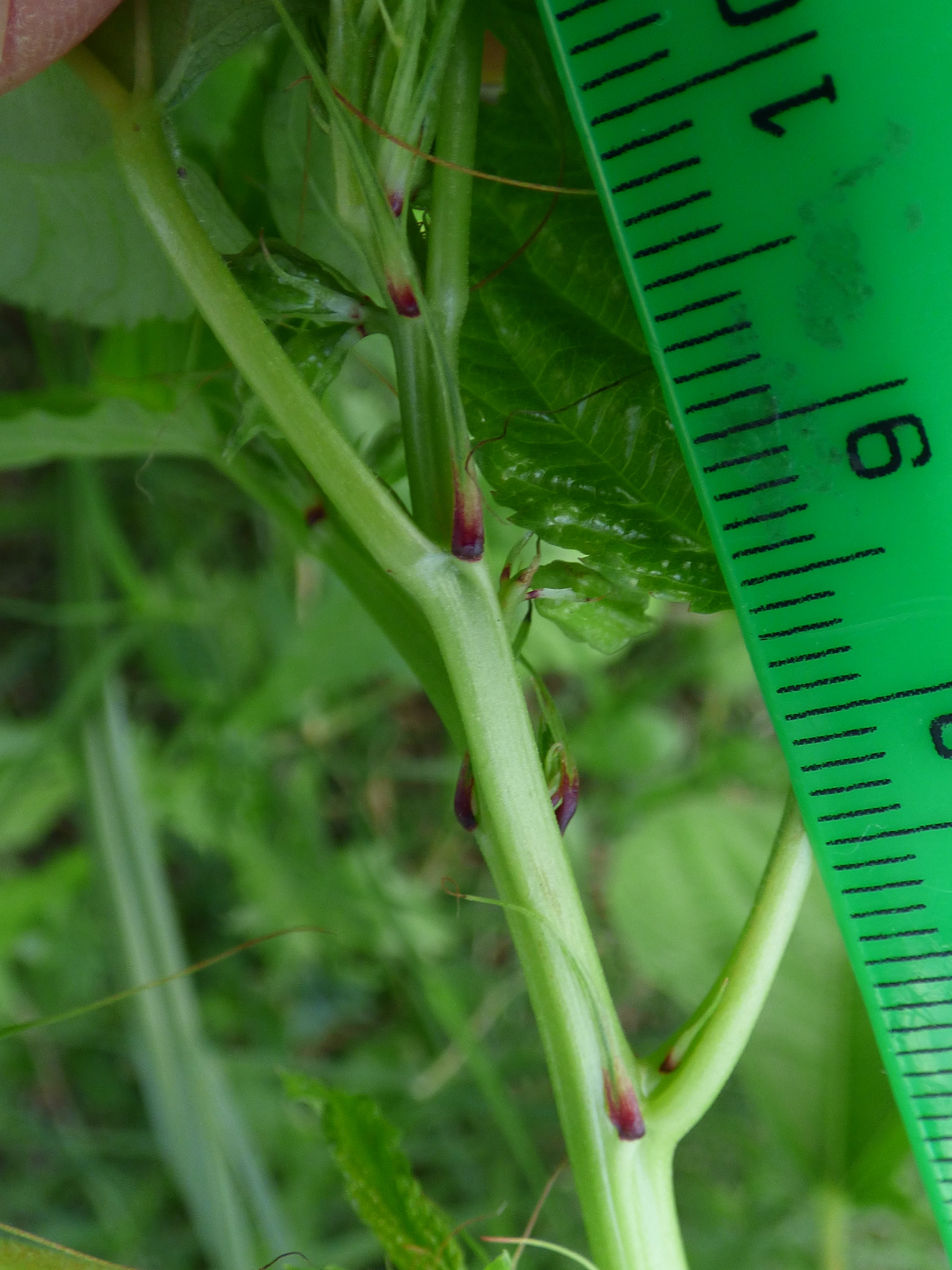
Stipules filamenty

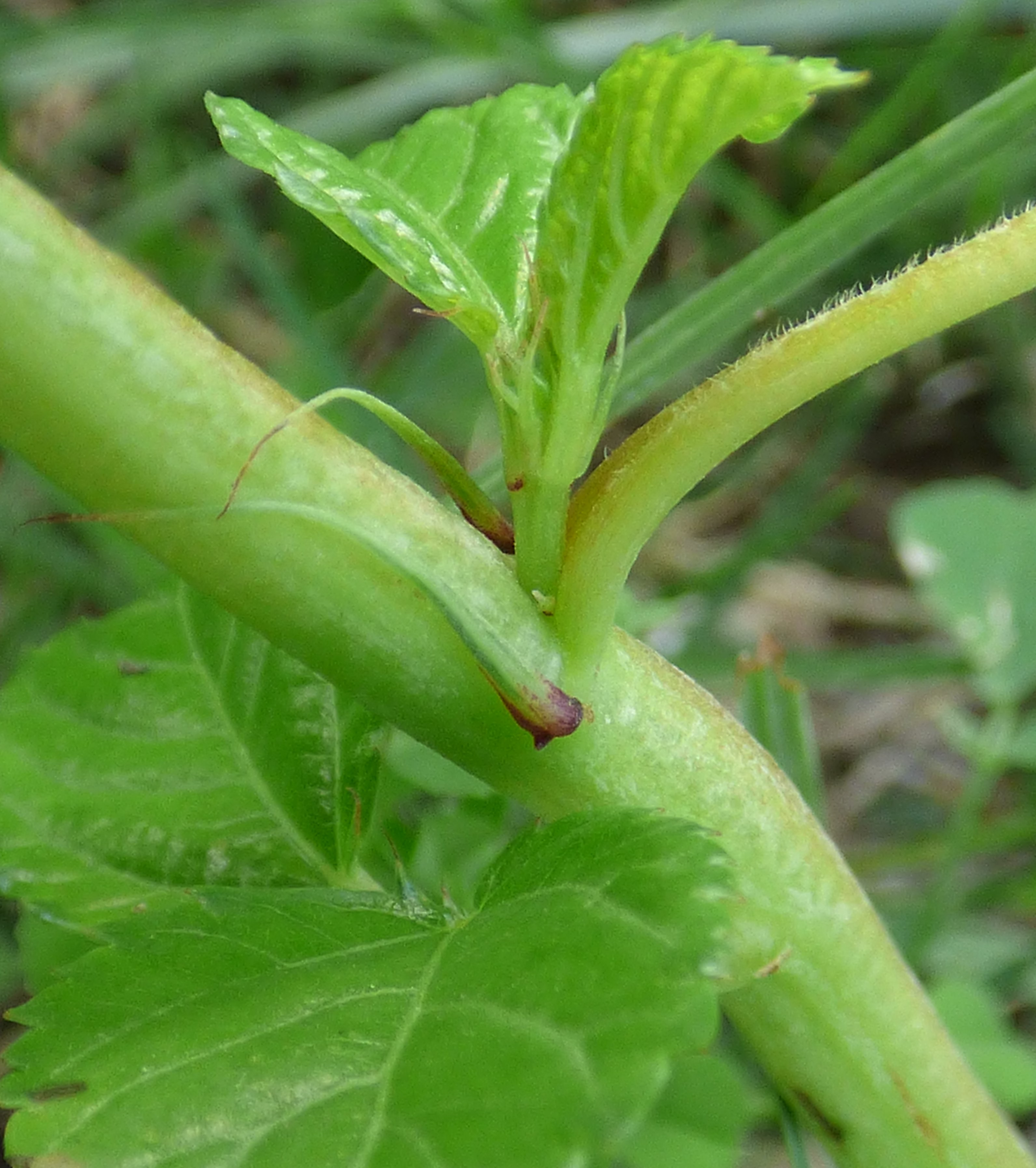
Stipules filamenty

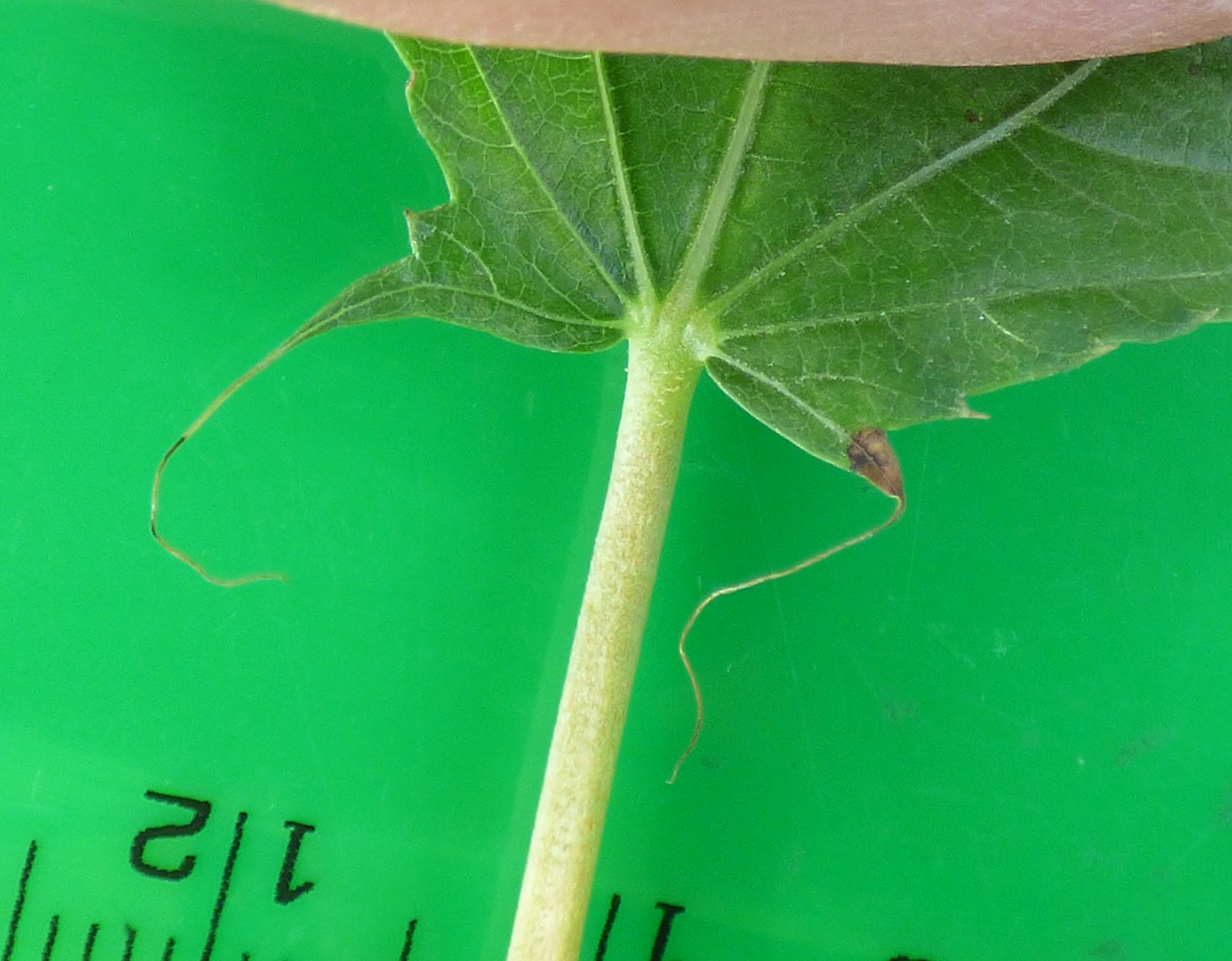
Leaf base teeth pair filamenty

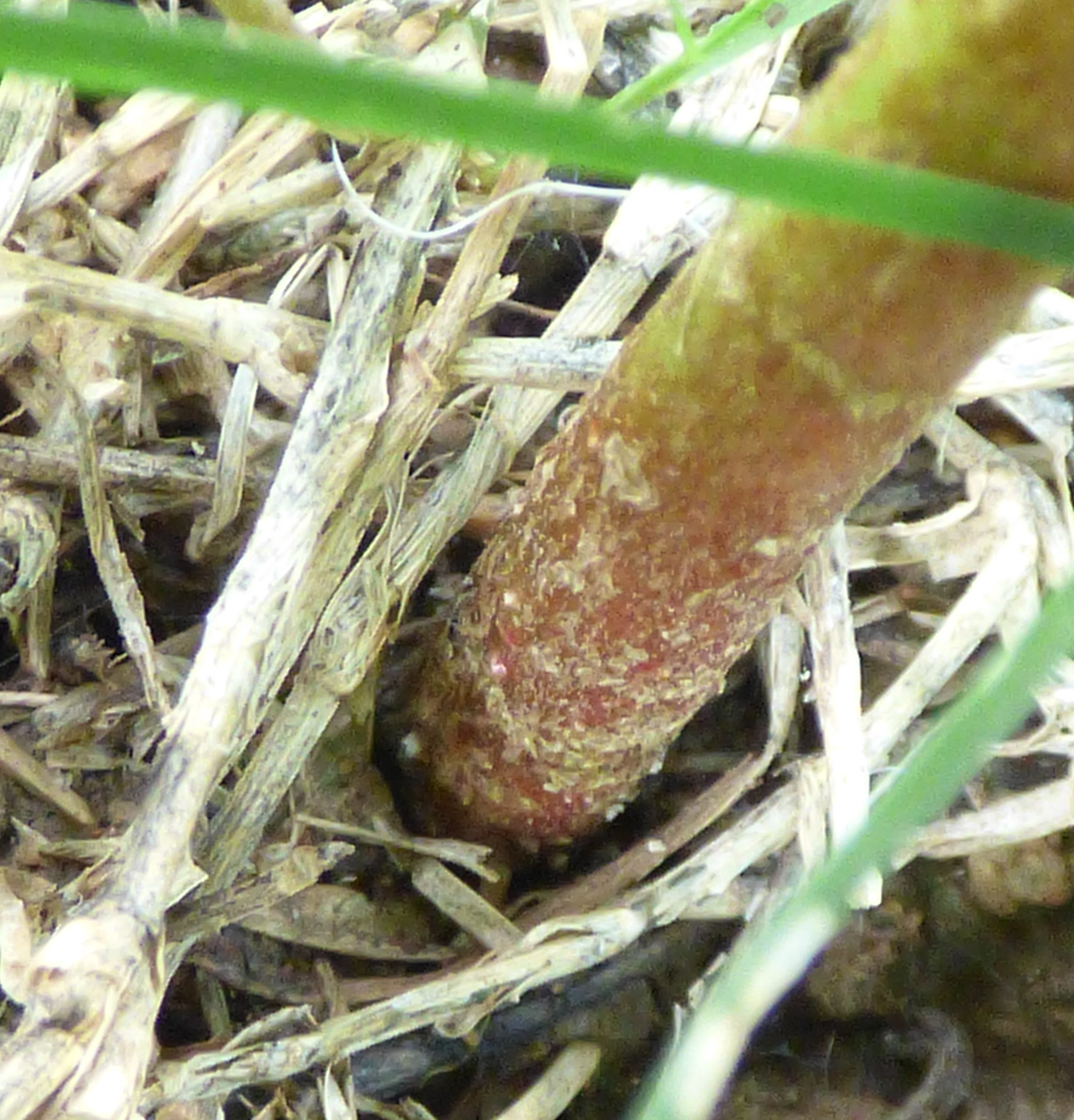
Annual stem base

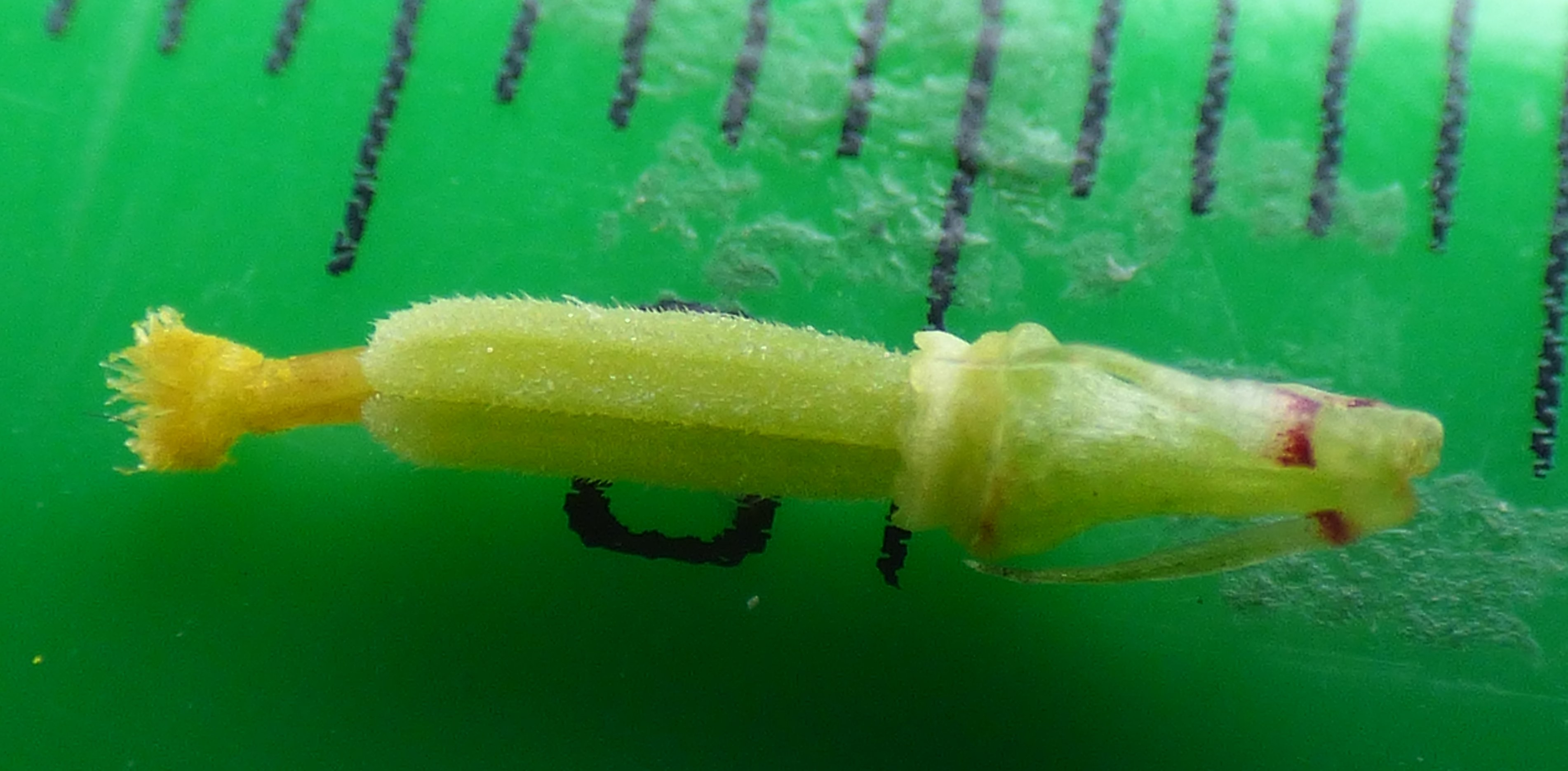
Maturing ovary

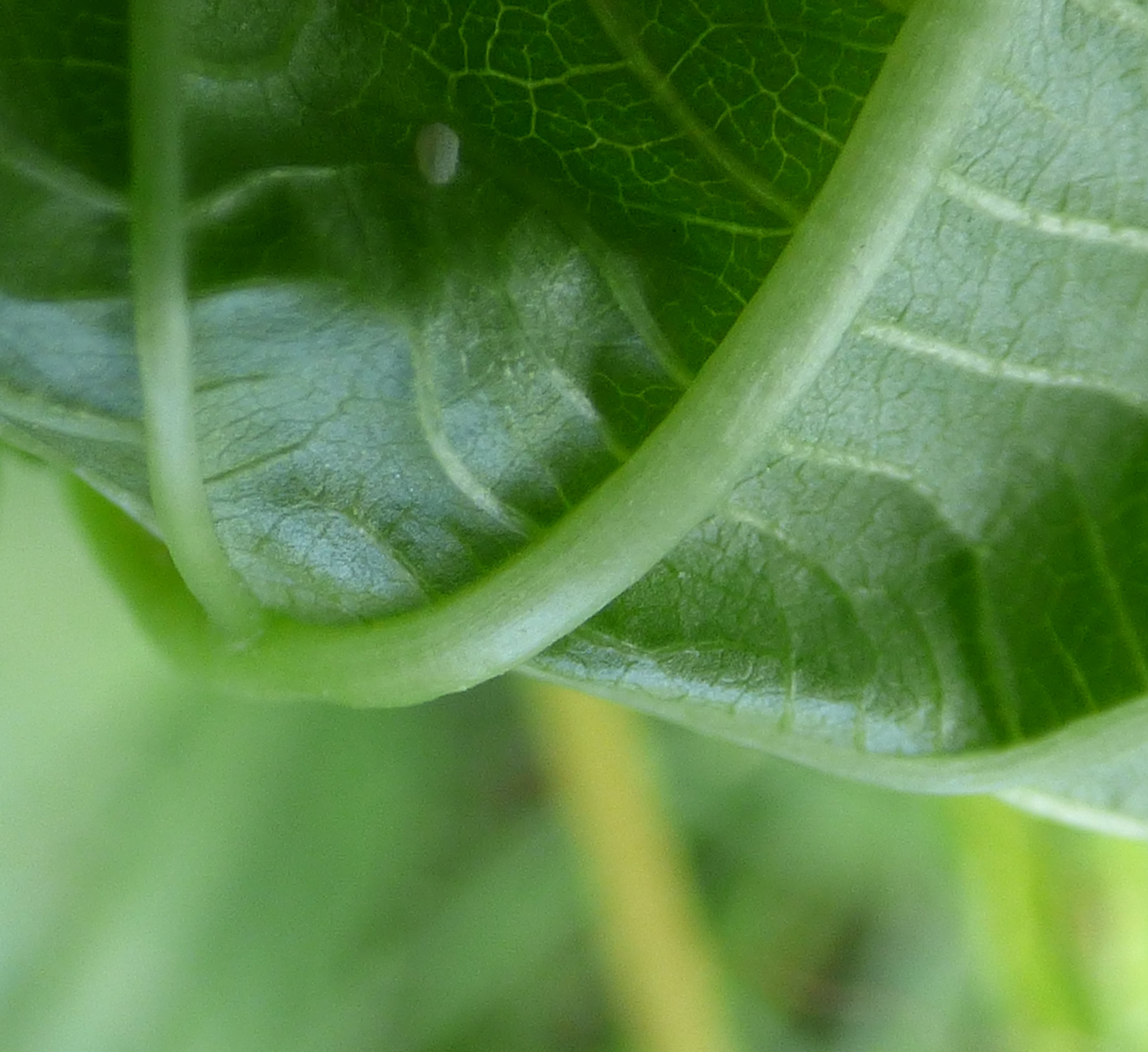
Leaf underside

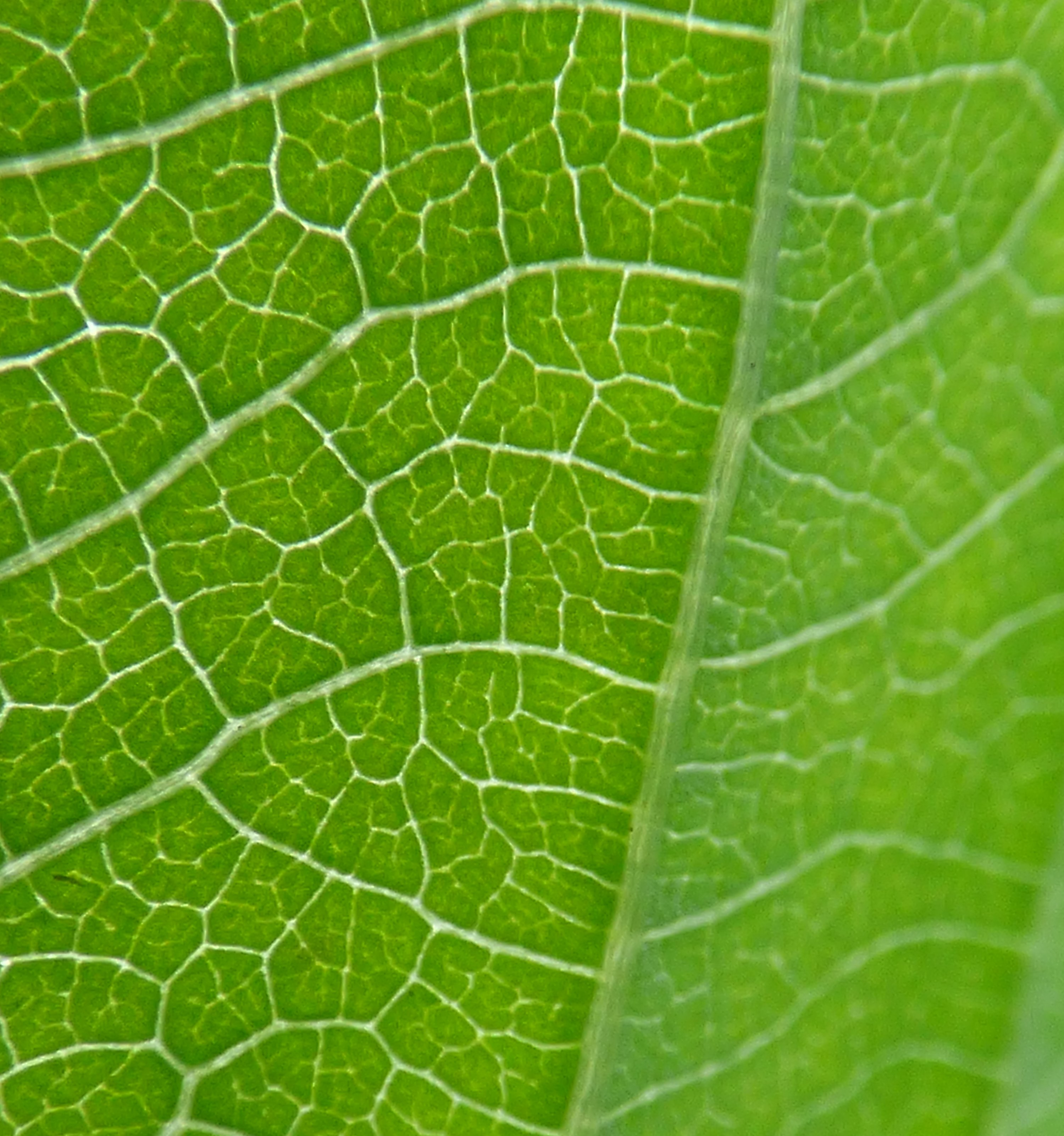
Veination

== See also ==
- Mulukhiyah
- Corchorus
- Corchorus capsularis
- Jute
- Jute cultivation
- Kenaf
- Abutilon theophrasti
- Fakou
- Ewedu soup
