= Jew's mallow =

Jew's mallow is a common name for several flowering plants and may refer to:

- Corchorus olitorius (Egyptian Arabic mulukhiyah) in the mallow family (Malvaceae), cultivated for its edible leaves and jute fiber
- Kerria japonica in the rose family (Rosaceae), cultivated as an ornamental
