= Fakou =

Traditional Soup of Niger and Northern Mali

Fakou, also known as Fakou Foye or Fakoye, is a traditional soup of the Songhai and Tuareg people in Niger and Northern Mali. This dark green, slightly thick soup is made from jute leaves scientifically known as Corchorus olitorius, commonly referred to as Mulukhiyah in North Africa and Ayoyo in Ghana.

== Ingredients ==
Fakou is typically garnished with lamb or beef, with the defining ingredient being the jute leaf. The traditional choice of oil used is cow butter (“Hawji” in Songhai)

== Preparation ==
To make Fakou sauce, the jute leaves is transformed into a semi-fine dry substance. Key ingredients include Kabé (Mousse Renne), Cumin powder, red pepper, black and white Penja pepper ("fêfê" in Songhai), Selim pepper, soumbala, dried small fish, date paste, cinnamon powder, green anise, nutmeg, and cow butter. The seasoning is adaptable to personal preference. The preparation involves adding water to a pot, incorporating the ingredients, boiling the mixture, and then introducing the Corète potagère.

Fakou is commonly served with rice.

== Distinctive traits ==
Fakou sauce's culinary appeal is marked by visible oil on the surface during cooking, enhancing the dish's taste and quality.
