= Cottonization =

Process that alters fiber properties

Cottonization is a process that adapts flax and hemp fibres for spinning with other staple fibres such as cotton or wool. Cottonization removes impurities (non-fibrous materials such as lignin or pectin) and shortens the fiber length of flax for subsequent spinning processes. Cottonized fibers are helpful in blending with other staple fibers such as cotton or wool.

== Process ==
Cottonization can convert flax to short single fibres. These short fibres can be spun similarly to cotton. It includes the process of removing the lignin that holds the hemp fibres together. Lignin gives stalks their rigidity, It acts as a glue that holds the plant cell wall together.

=== Methods ===
Methods of obtaining cottonized fibers are as below:

- Mechanical
- Chemical
- Enzymatic

== See also ==
- Retting – Isolating plant fiber by rotting all else
- Plasma treatment (textiles) – Surface modification process for textiles
