= Retting =

Isolating plant fiber by rotting all else

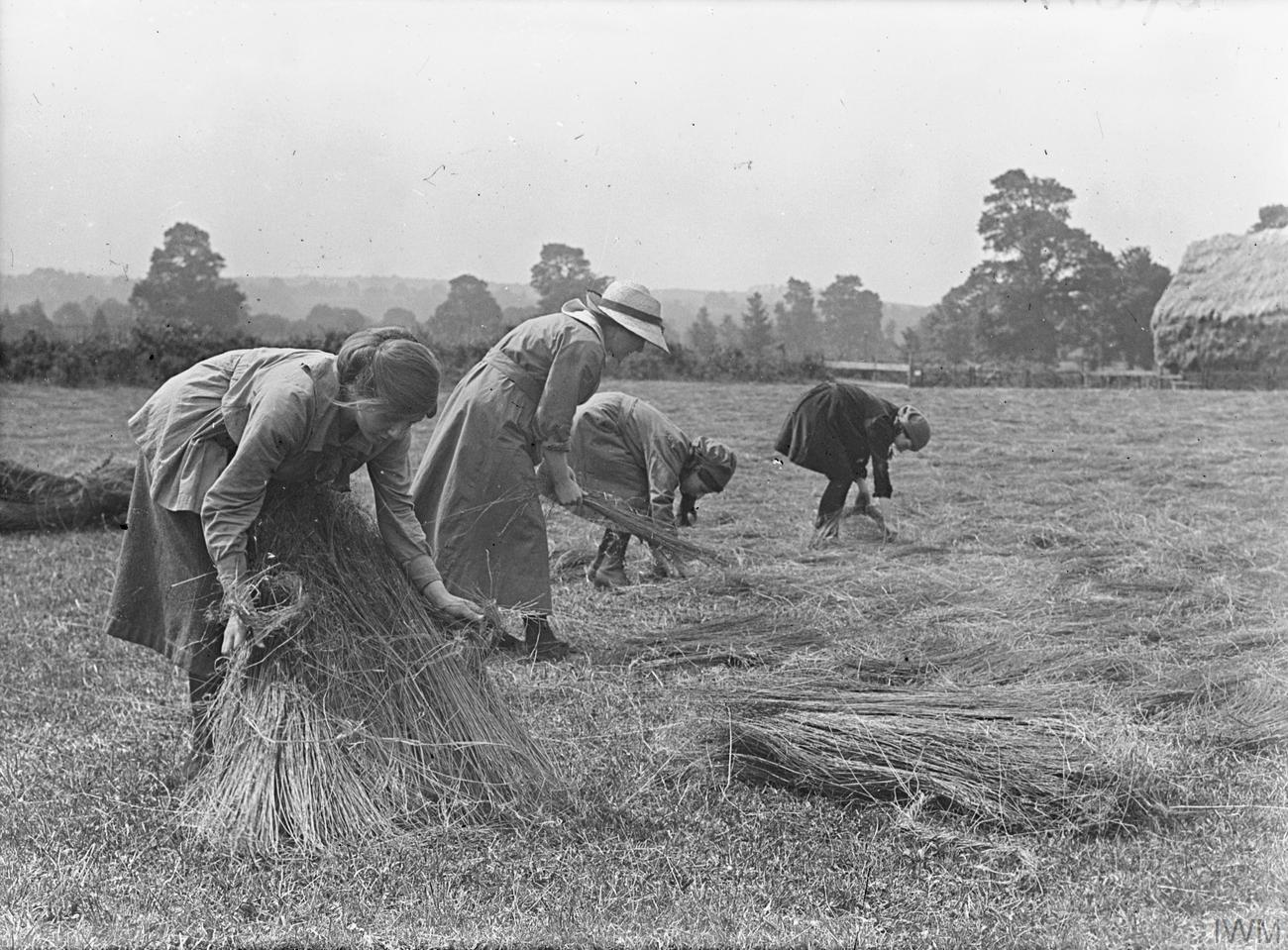
Flax being laid out in a field for dew retting, c. 1915-1918

Retting is a textile process for separating the bast fibre in plants from the non-fibrous materials to create fibers that can be spun into yarn. The separation is primarily achieved through either a microbial or chemical action degradating the cementing compounds that bind the bast fibres to other plant tissues, allowing the fibers to be isolated. Retting can be used to create fibers from plants such as flax, hemp, nettles, ramie, bamboo, and jute.

== Water retting ==
The two main methods of microbial retting are water retting and dew (field) retting. In water retting, plant stems (e.g., flax) are harvested and submerged in natural bodies of water. While underwater, anaerobic bacteria degrade the cementing compounds, typically pectin, allowing the bast fibres to separate from the woody tissues, called shive, in the stem. The stems are then removed from the water and dried by the sun before being cleaned to remove the shive. As the bacterial process was somewhat understood at the time of water retting's greatest popularity, practitioners were able to develop improvements to the process, including controlling the temperature of the water by submerging the stalks in contained tanks or pits, selecting for better microbial variety, and aerating the containers to reduce the smell and pollution generated by the bacterial action.

Water retted fibers are high quality, though the process produces more pollution than dew retting, has higher production costs, and the smell from anaerobic digestion lingers in the fibers. It is also possible to over- and under-rett: over-retting results from cellulase weakening the cellulose bast fibers; under-retting results in poor separation of the fibers and shive, requiring more labor to remove the shive.

== Dew retting ==
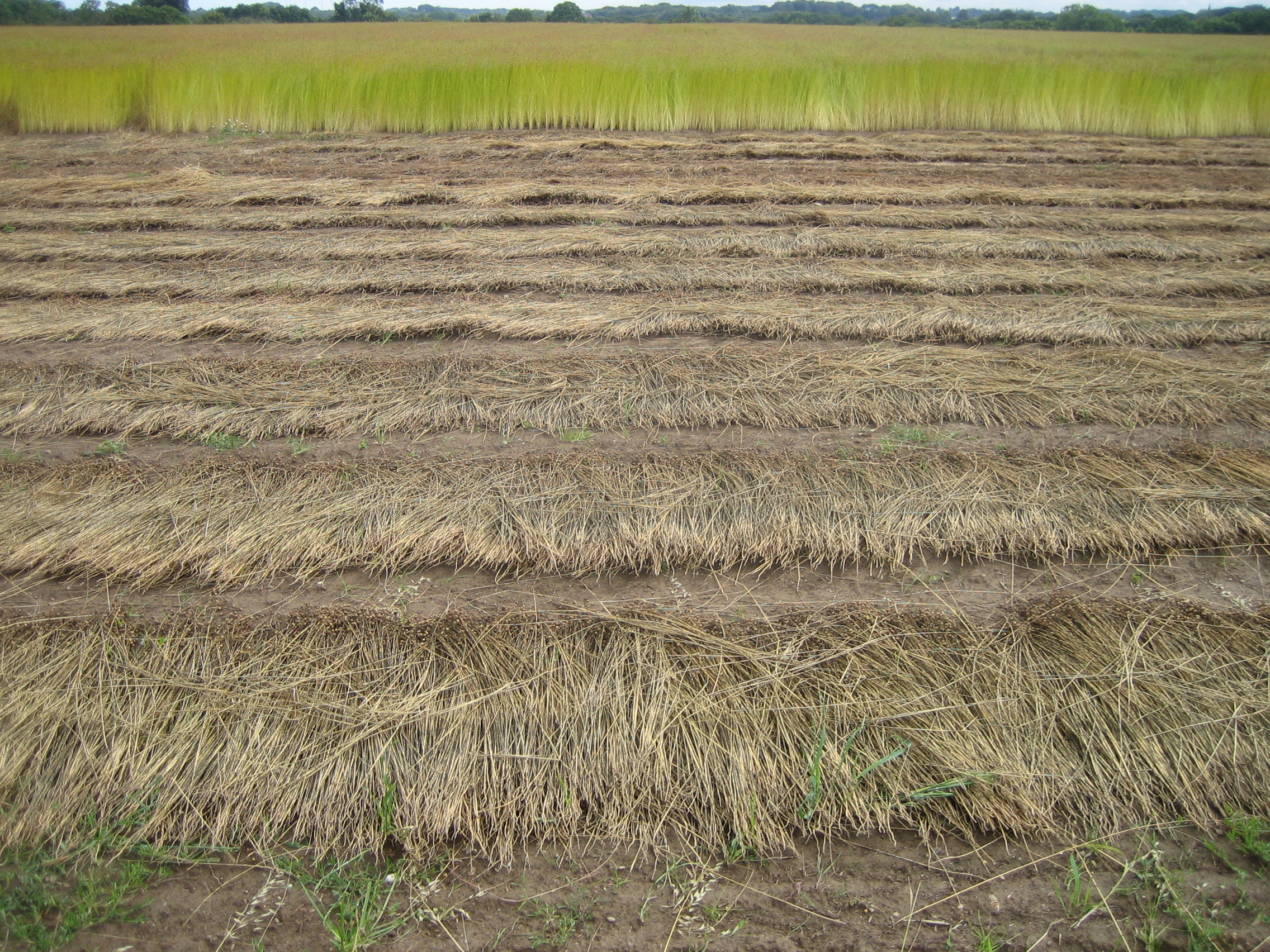
Dew retting of flax in Normandy (2009)

Dew retting has largely replaced water retting due to its lower production costs, higher fiber yields, and the absence of odor from the anaerobic process; however, it produces a lower and inconsistent quality fiber than water retting and takes longer (2-5 weeks compared to days for water retting).

In dew retting, plant stalks are harvested and then laid out in rows to be colonized by fungi. This process requires an appropriate moisture level and temperature conducive to bacterial colonization; areas that were previously known for linen production by water retting, like England, Ireland, and Scandinavia, have declined with the increase in dew retting, as the climate is not favorable to the process. Dew retting monopolizes large tracts of land while the stems are retting. The fibers are also typically dirtied with soil and fungi from lying on the ground. Since the process is less controlled than water retting, dew retting is impacted by climate extremes, which affect fungal growth. Dew retting is common in areas with limited water resources.

== See also ==
- Textile manufacture during the Industrial Revolution
- Timeline of clothing and textiles technology
- Cottonization
