= Camperdown Works =

Once the world's largest jute works, now defunct, in Dundee, Scotland

Coordinates: 56.473°N 3.006°W

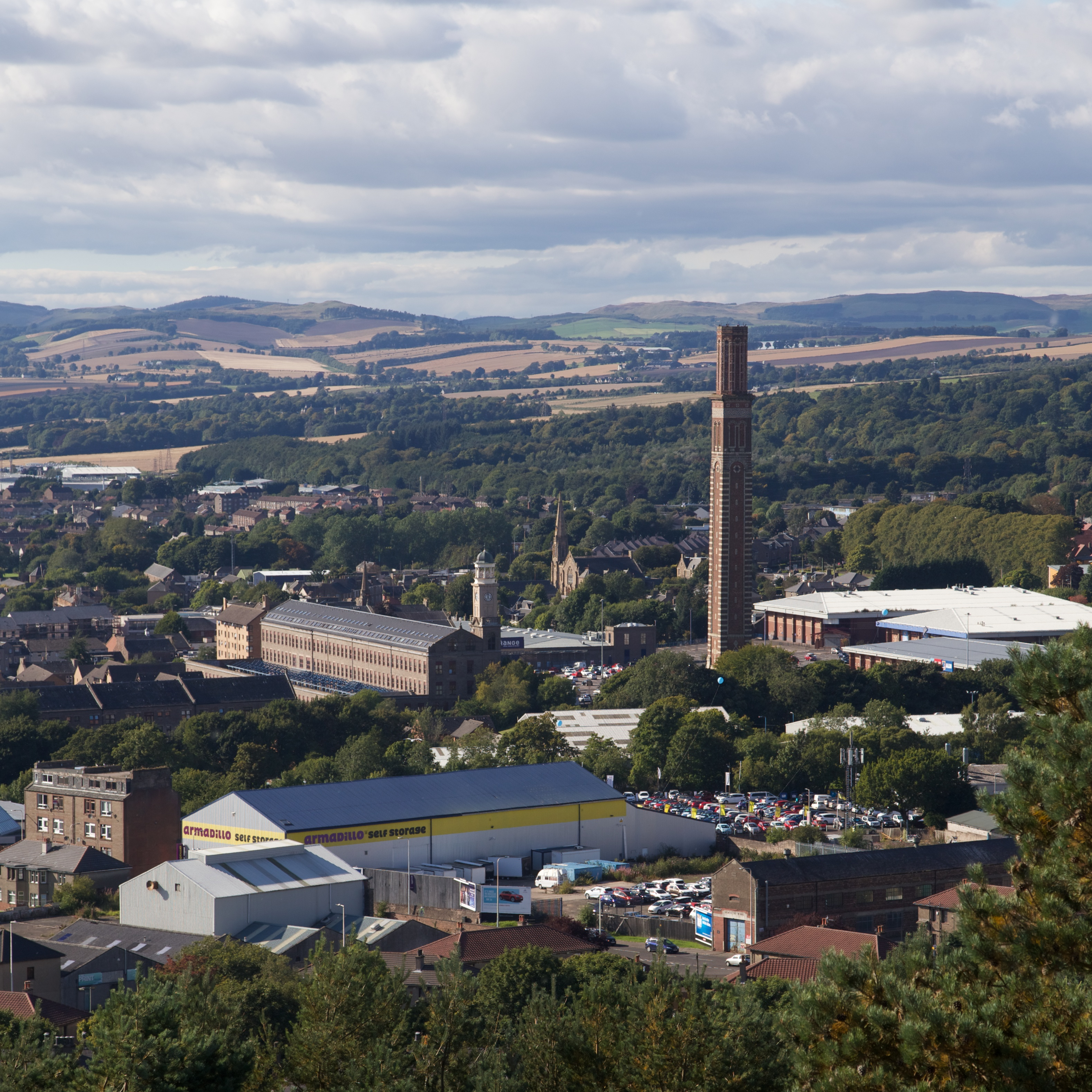
- The High Mill and Cox's Stack, the only remnants left of Camperdown Works

General information
- Status: Demolished, site redeveloped
- Location: Lochee, Dundee, Scotland
- Year built: 1849—1857
- Completed: 1866
- Closed: 1981
- Owner: Cox Brothers

Camperdown Works was a jute manufacturing complex in Dundee, Scotland, which covered around 30 acres and employing at its peak almost 6,000 workers. Developed from 1849 as a purpose-built and highly integrated industrial complex, it brought together spinning, weaving, dyeing and finishing processes on a single site served by its own railway branch. For a period in the later nineteenth century it was the world's largest jute works in the world and was owned by Cox Brothers.

The works formed part of Dundee’s emergence as the principal centre of mechanised jute manufacture within the British Empire, processing raw fibre imported largely from Bengal and exporting finished goods to international markets.

== History ==
The Cox family was connected with the linen trade in Lochee from the early 18th century when a member of the family was a small manufacturer in the area. The family's Scottish lineage, including members associated with the early development of the family's industrial enterprises in Dundee, is documented in Family Records by Ashworth Peter Burke (1897), which traces the family from the late 17th century.

In 1827 James Cock (subsequently known as Cox), the son of James Cock of Foggyley and Helen Scott, assumed control of the family business and in 1841 formed a co-partnering with his brothers, William Cox, Thomas Hunter Cox and George Addison Cox. The firm was quick to adopt the most recent improvements and moved over from the linen trade to jute trade. Another brother, Henry Cox, was generally resident in Calcutta, where he managed the firm’s business interests in India, reflecting the growing importance of the jute trade between Bengal and Dundee.

=== Construction and operation ===
Alexander Elliot in his book Lochee – As it was and is (1911), noted that each of the Cox brothers brought specialist skills to the firm: James, the salesman, expanded overseas sales, William was regarded as a reliable judge of yarns and materials, and Thomas oversaw finance and commercial management. George Addison Cox, “a qualified engineer. To him the entire control of the works was given. In each department the impress of a master mind is apparent, in construction, attention to detail, and in the productive power of appliances.” In addition to supervising the construction and operation of the works, George Addison Cox was responsible for the design and improvement of machinery used in the preparation and spinning of jute fibre. Several patents granted to him in the 1850s and 1860s related to machinery for handling jute and other fibrous materials.

Warden noted that the Camperdown Works of Cox Brothers appeared unusual in the district in carrying out the entire manufacturing process - from raw material to finished cloth - within a single works complex, with materials passing systematically between departments.

The development of Camperdown Works formed part of the wider Industrial Revolution in Scotland, during which Dundee emerged as a major centre of mechanised textile manufacture.

In 1849, construction began of Camperdown Works, in Lochee and within a few years all of their operations relating to the manufacture of jute were carried out on the site.

The first building to be erected on the site by the Cox Brothers was the power loom factory which was the largest then built in Dundee. A hand loom factory was built to its north in 1853, holding 225 looms. One of the most significant developments on the site was the High Mill, which author Mark Watson argues to have been one of the finest textile mills in Victorian Scotland. It was built in three stages from 1857 and included a 100-foot clock tower.

By the late 1860s the Works had developed into a large and highly integrated industrial complex.. In 1869 David Bremner described it as occupying eighteen acres of level ground, constructed on a “regular and well-considered plan” designed to allow extension without disrupting internal arrangements, indicating that the works had been deliberately planned to accommodate the future expansion of production. A branch line connected the Works to the nearby Dundee and Newtyle Railway, enabling raw materials to be delivered directly to the site and finished goods dispatched by rail to Dundee's harbour and wider transport networks.

The Jute fibre processed at Camperdown Works was imported primarily form Bengal, then the principal region of global jute cultivation, linking agricultural production in South Asia with mechanised textile manufacture in Dundee.

Raw jute was stored in large detached warehouses before passing through successive stages of manufacture arranged across purpose-built buildings. Bremner described the initial “batching” process, in which the fibre was treated with oil and water to soften it prior to spinning, followed by mechanical preparation and spinning processes similar to those used in flax manufacture. The machinery used at Camperdown was reported in 1869 to be of recent construction and largely made on the premises. The presence of engineering workshops and a foundry reflected a wider pattern in Dundee’s jute industry, where the development and adaptation of specialised machinery for processing jute formed an important part of local industrial activity.

Several machines used at the Works were of George Addison Cox's own design, and patents were granted in the 1850s and 1860s for machinery used in the preparation of jute and other fibrous materials. Contemporary accounts indicate that technical innovation at Camperdown formed part of a wider pattern within the Dundee textile industry, and within the Cox firm itself. William Cox in particular, was recognised for his expertise in power looms and developed improvements in hydraulic jute baling, increasing the weight of bales without enlarging their size, as well as introducing a new type of jute batching and softening machine.

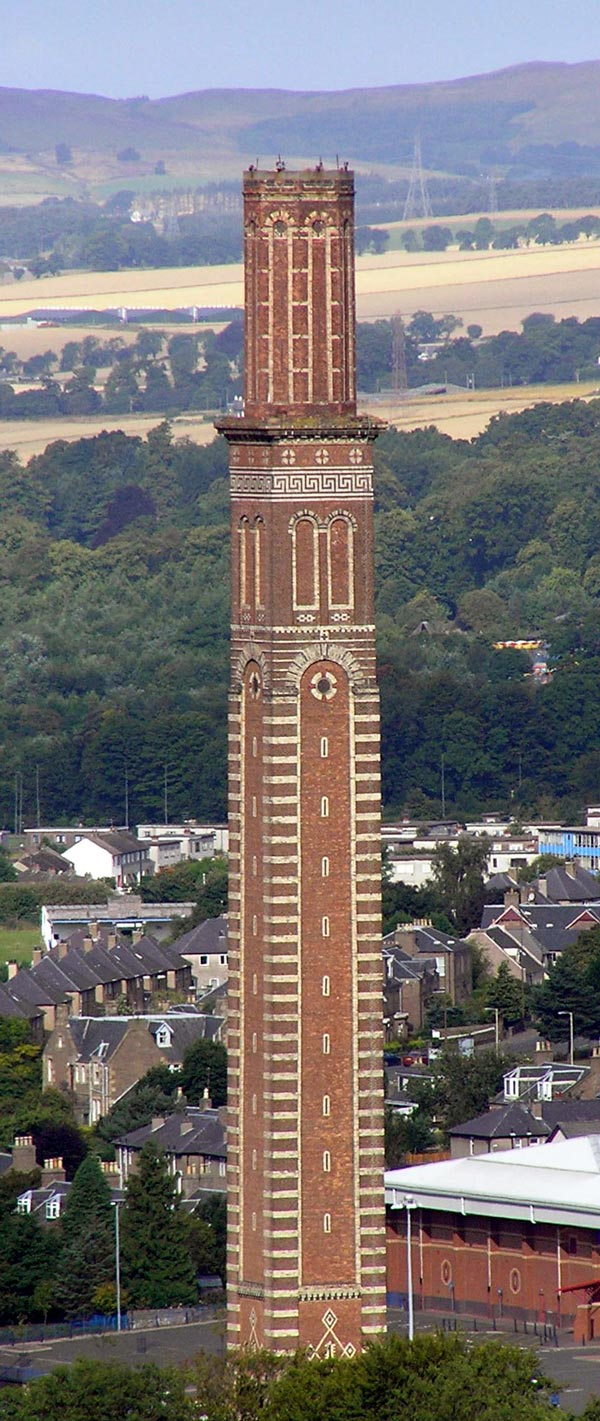
Cox's Stack, a Category A Listed Building in Lochee, Dundee, Camperdown Works, designed by George Addison Cox with James MacLaren, built 1865-6, visible on the city’s skyline.

Steam power was central to the operation of the Works. In 1869 the machinery was driven by engines with an aggregate nominal capacity of 580 horsepower (1,850 indicated horsepower), supplied by 22 boilers arranged in a single line. The smoke from the furnaces was carried off by a large chimney, later known as “Cox’s Stack”, completed in 1866. Bremner recorded the chimney as 300 feet in height, while later architectural sources describe it as 282 feet high. Coal consumption in the late 1860s was approximately 15,000 tons per year. "Cox's Stack" remains one of the most prominent industrial landmarks in Dundee. To commemorate this, there is a small bronze statue of Cox's Stack on a plinth in Dundee High Street that was unveiled by Prince Charles in 1995 (Now King Charles III).

In addition to weaving sheds containing hundreds of power looms and hand looms, the site included a foundry for the repair and manufacture of machinery, warehouses for raw materials and finished goods, a three-bay engine shed serving the branch railway, and stables capable of housing up to thirty horses. By 1878 the Works employed approximately 4,500 workers, rising to 5,000 by 1900. Bremner recorded 4,300 persons employed within the Works in 1869, in addition to 400 sack-sewers working from their own homes.

Contemporary descriptions also noted the scale and internal conditions of the buildings. Bremner stated that the storeys ranged from fourteen to seventeen feet in height and that the rooms were thoroughly ventilated, exceeding the requirements of contemporary legislation. A half-time school for workers’ children was later established on the site, built in 1884 and closed in 1896. Together these elements formed a largely self-contained industrial system integrating production, power generation, engineering workshops and transport infrastructure within a single coordinated site.

=== Development of the jute industry in Bengal ===
The jute industry was historically and culturally important in Bengal long before the establishment of mechanised mills. Prior to the mid-nineteenth century, jute grown in Bengal was used locally to produce rope, sacks and coarse cloth using traditional hand-loom techniques. During the later nineteenth century, however, large mechanised jute mills began to be established around Kolkata. The industry expanded rapidly: by 1882 there were 18 mills in operation and by 1901 the number had risen to 51. The development of the Bengal mills was closely connected with the earlier expansion of the jute industry in Dundee, which had pioneered the mechanised spinning and weaving of jute fibre during the nineteenth century.

As the industry matured, however, production increasingly shifted closer to the source of raw jute in Bengal, where labour costs were lower and the supply of fibre was readily available. This gradual shift contributed to the long-term decline of large-scale jute manufacturing in Dundee during the twentieth century.

The rapid expansion of mechanised mills in Bengal later formed the basis of what is now described as the Jute industry in Bangladesh, which eventually became one of the world’s largest centres of jute production.

== Management ==
Following James Cox's death in 1885 his son Edward took a key role in the management of the works and Cox Brothers Ltd which became a Limited Liability Company, in 1893. In 1920 the firm became a part of a new Dundee-based company Jute Industries Ltd. This was a new venture which acquired several of Dundee's jute works. Jute Industries' Chairman from 1920 to 1948 was James Ernest Cox, the son of Edward Cox. Jute Industries became Sidlaw Industries Ltd in 1971. In 1940 Jute Industries advertised themselves as 'the largest firm of jute spinners and manufacturers in Great Britain'

In addition to Camperdown Works, Cox Brothers had several offices. In 1888 these included premises in Meadow Place Dundee, as well as Glasgow, Manchester and London.

=== Closure ===
Production at the works ceased in 1981 and some parts of the complex were sold for demolition in 1985. The site was used as a double for 1940s Berlin in the 1980s BBC television drama Christabel.

== The Stack Leisure Park ==
Following the closure of the jute works, the site of Camperdown Works was sold to Michael Johnston, a local entrepreneur from Dundee in the 1980s and was redeveloped into The Stack Leisure Park which opened in 1992.

=== Construction ===
Following the purchase, the High Mill was redeveloped into flats and many of the buildings in the works were demolished to make way for a leisure park with the Cox's Stack being retained.

=== Features ===
The Leisure park originally consisted of an Odeon cinema, a William Low (later rebranded as Tesco) superstore, The Venue, a local nightclub, the Megabowl, a bowling alley and Gala Bingo.

By the late 2000s, many of the original tenants either left or were forced to shut down, leaving Gala Bingo as the sole business on site. Many of the buildings at the park were boarded up and left abandoned.

=== Revival ===
Following a period of abandonment, the site was then purchased by TJ Morris in 2012 who opened a Home Bargains store on site. The Range opened up a store on the site of the former Tesco store in 2014. Smyths opened a toy store in 2015 with The Gym Group opening up a gym next door in 2017.

In 2023, Greggs opened a restaurant and drive through at the entrance of the park and Home Bargains moved to the former Odeon site, which opened in December of that year.
