= George Addison Cox =

Scottish engineer and industrialist (1820–1899)

- Born: 1820; Lochee, Dundee, Scotland
- Died: May 6, 1899; Tunbridge Wells, Kent, England
- Occupations: Engineer and industrialist
- Known for: Design, engineering and development of Camperdown Works
- Spouse: Eliza Methven

George Addison Cox (1820 – 6 May 1899) was a Scottish industrialist and architect-engineer closely associated with the Camperdown Works in Lochee, Dundee, one of the largest integrated jute manufacturing complexes of the 19th century. During the Industrial Revolution in Scotland, he designed much of the Camperdown Works complex and oversaw its engineering layout and mechanical organisation, contributing to the growth of large-scale jute manufacturing in Dundee, then a major centre of the jute industry.

He oversaw the layout and installation of machinery at Camperdown Works, drawing on practical experience in mechanical design and mill engineering, and is credited with the engineering design of its landmark chimney, Cox's Stack, which remains a prominent feature of the city's industrial landscape.

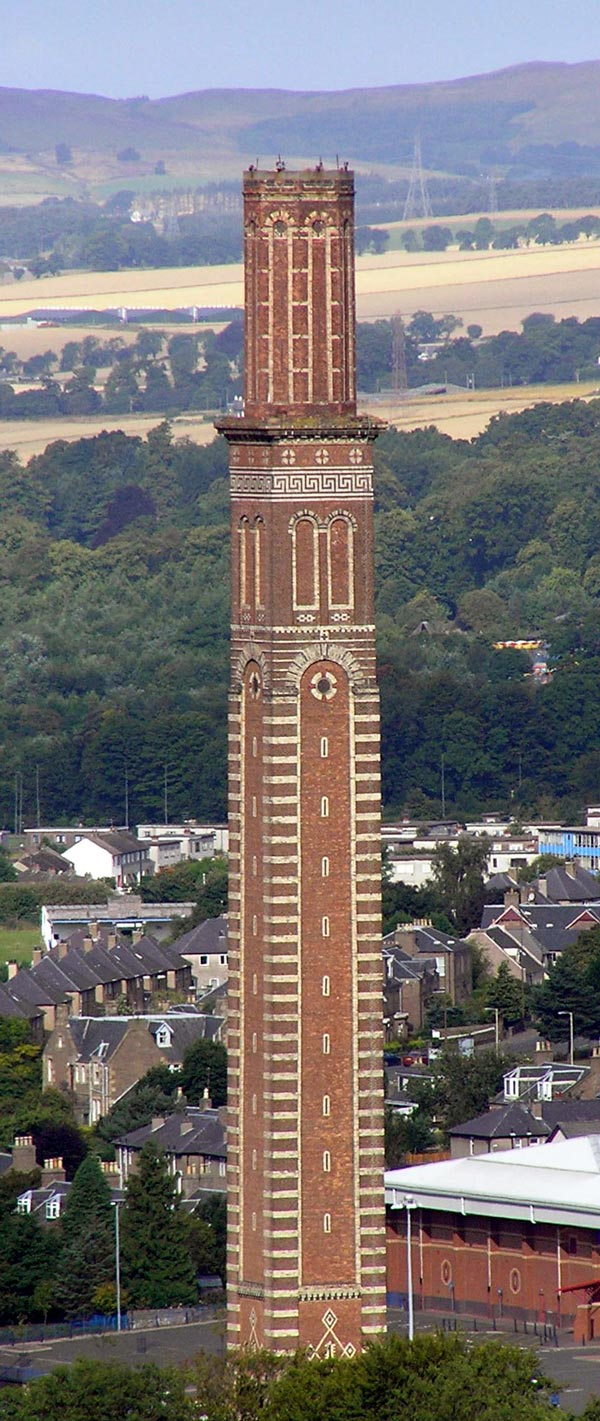
Cox's Stack, a Category A Listed Building in Lochee, Dundee, Camperdown Works, designed by George Addison Cox with James MacLaren, built 1865–6, visible on the city's skyline.

Through George Addison Cox's planning, engineering and supervision, the Camperdown Works grew to become the world's largest jute factory.

== Early life ==
Cox was born in Lochee in 1820, the youngest son of James Cock (later Cox) and Helen Scott. He later joined his brothers James, William and Thomas Hunter Cox in the family firm, which transitioned from linen to jute manufacture during the mid-nineteenth century. Another brother, Henry Cox, was generally resident in Calcutta to manage business interests there.

== Camperdown Works ==
According to the Dictionary of Scottish Architects, the construction of completely new works at Lochee began in 1850 to George Addison Cox's design. It lists and attributes the design of numerous buildings within the complex to Cox over the following three decades, noting Peter Carmichael's assistance in connection with the High (Sliver) Mill and James Maclaren's collaboration on Cox's Stack. The complex was planned as a single integrated manufacturing site, bringing together the full sequence of processes from raw jute to finished cloth.

Warden noted that the Camperdown Works of Cox Brothers were unusual in the district in carrying out the entire manufacturing process within a single works, with materials passing systematically between departments. This arrangement has been noted as a distinctive feature of the works.

By the 1870s the complex covered approximately thirty acres and employed several thousand workers. Its most prominent surviving feature is Cox's Stack, an 86-metre (282 ft) chimney, now a Category A listed building. It has been described in listing commentary as one of the most distinguished industrial chimneys in Scotland, noted for its height and elaborate decorative design. The engineering design is attributed to Cox, with architectural detailing by the Dundee architect James MacLaren. There is a small bronze statue of Cox's Stack on a plinth in Dundee High Street that was unveiled by Prince Charles in 1995 (Now King Charles III).

An early twentieth-century account described George Addison Cox as “a qualified engineer” to whom “the entire control of the works was given”, noting that in each department “the impress of a master mind is apparent.” Warden also noted that works were laid out on a regular plan, allowing materials to pass efficiently from department to department.

== Engineering work and patents ==
In addition to his role in the management of Cox Brothers, he was responsible for much of the engineering design work associated with the development of the firm's mills at Lochee. Contemporary descriptions credited him with overseeing the construction of the works and the installation of machinery used in the preparation, spinning and weaving of jute.

Cox patented a series of improvements to textile machinery during the mid-nineteenth century, reflecting successive stages of textile production. His earliest recorded patent related to improvements in machinery or apparatus for winding yarn or thread (1854), followed by a patent for improvements in the treatment and preparation of jute, hemp, flax and other fibrous materials (1863). His later patents included improvements in carpets, sackings, checks, bed-ticks or tickings, and other similar textile fabrics (1868).

Other members of the Cox family, including his brother William Cox, also contributed to technical developments in textile machinery. These developments reflected the challenges of adapting machinery originally developed for flax and other fibres to the processing of jute.

== Public service ==
He served as a justice of the peace and was later appointed deputy lieutenant of Dundee.

== Family ==
George Addison Cox married Eliza Methven (1827–1872) in 1848. She was the daughter of David Methven. According to Burke (1897), the couple had seven children: six sons and one daughter. Their children included James Cox; David Methven Cox; George Methven Cox; Alfred William Cox; Charles Thomas Cox; Edmund Connel Cox; and Jessie Methven Cox (6 July 1854 – 30 November 1928), who married Dr William Sinclair-Thomson (brother of Sir St Clair Thomson) on 6 October 1875 in Dundee.

George's fifth son, Charles Thomas Cox (c.1865–1948), was the subject of a Court of Session succession case, after his death, concerning the interpretation of his will, in which the court held that children conceived but not yet born at the time of his death were entitled to inherit under the terms of the settlement.

== Invertrossachs ==
In 1875 George Addison Cox purchased the Invertrossachs estate on the southern shore of Loch Venachar in Perthshire. According to Thomas Hunter, the estate extended for about 4 miles (6.4 km) along the southern shore of the loch.

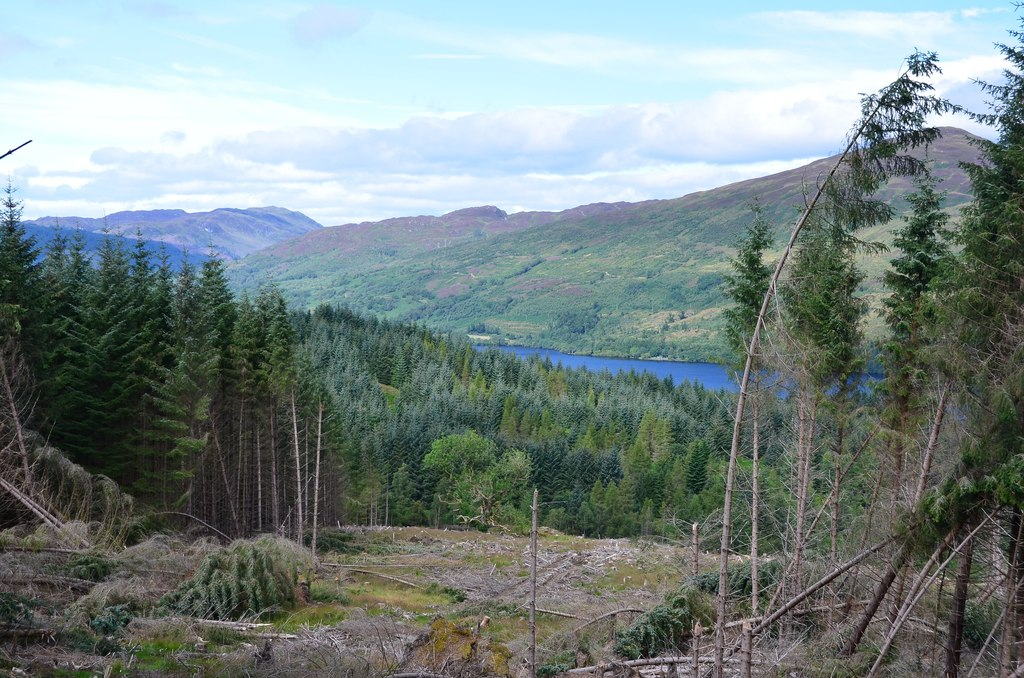
Loch Venachar in view

At the time of purchase it included about 300 acres of mature woodland, and over the following eight years Cox planted a further 200 acres, principally with larch, Scots pine and spruce. He also carried out extensive drainage, erected substantial stone dykes and wire fencing, improved grazing, and introduced better breeding stock for Blackface sheep and Highland cattle.

Hunter also presented the estates acquired by George Addison Cox and his brothers James and William as notable examples of the improvements undertaken by new proprietors in Perthshire during the late nineteenth century, describing extensive programmes of planting, drainage, road-making and landscape enhancement shortly after each estate was acquired.

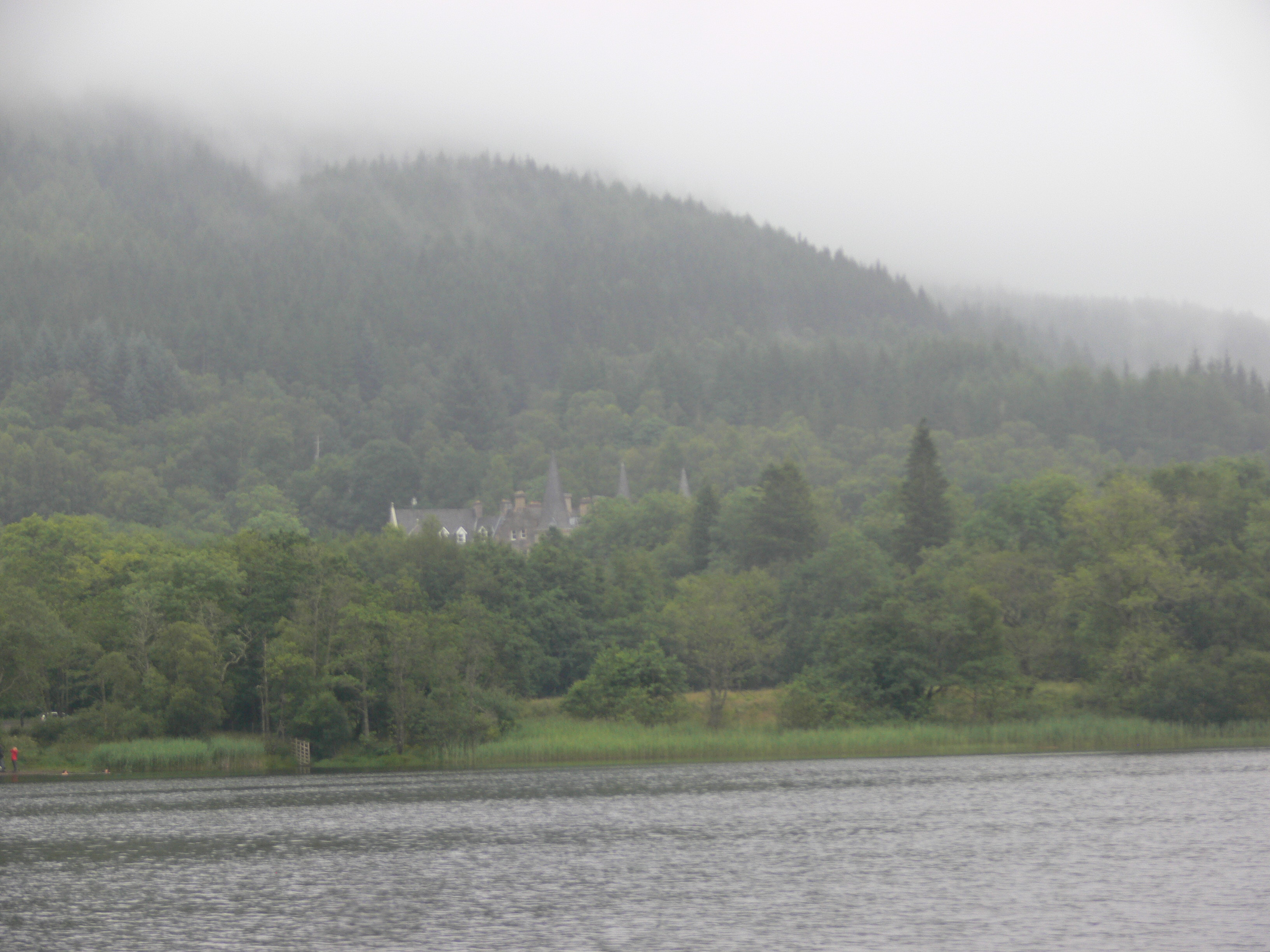
Southern shore view towards Invertrossachs from Loch Venachar

In 1893 Malcolm Ferguson described Invertrossachs House as occupying "a beautiful site on the brow of an elevated eminence overlooking the lake", commanding "a varied and magnificent look-out".

== Death ==
Cox died at Tunbridge Wells on 6 May 1899.

== See also ==
- YouTube video - Camperdown Works. Dr Kenneth Baxter takes a look at an interesting and important drawing of Dundee's famous Camperdown Works which is held by the University of Dundee Archive Services.
- Domesday Reloaded Camperdown Works Dundee 1986
- Cox Brothers Ltd, Jute Spinners and Manufacturers, and Cox Family Papers at University of Dundee Archive Services
- Cox Brothers, Jute Spinners and Manufactures, Dundee at University of Dundee Archive Services
