= Tambour lace =

Type of handmade lace

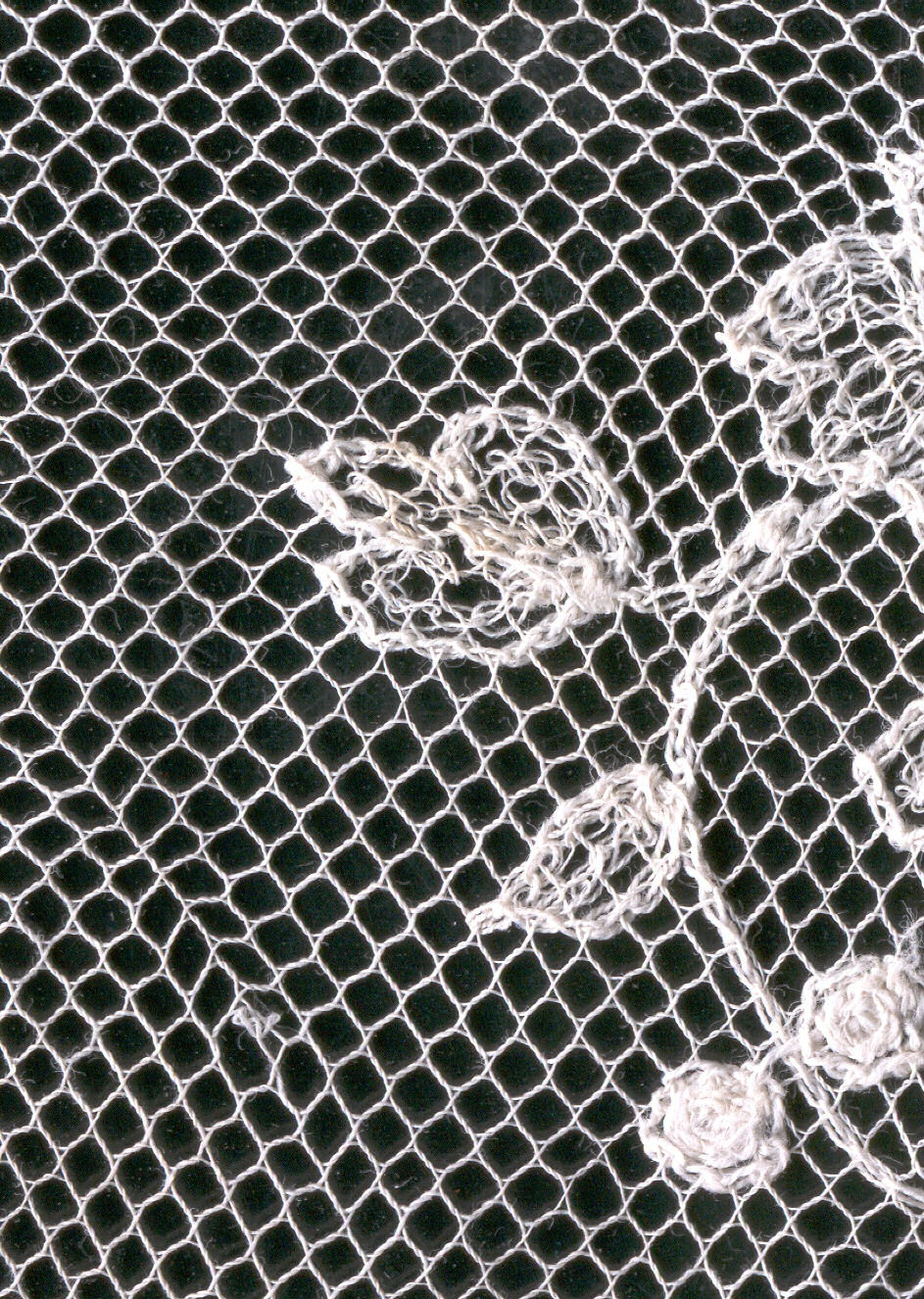
Lace from Lier

Tambour lace refers to a family of lace made by stretching a fine net over a frame (the eponymous tambour, from the French for drum) and creating a chain stitch, known as tambour, using a fine, pointed hook to reach through the net and draw the working thread through.

Lier lace is also produced as a stitch work on netting structure with a hook. It is one of the decorated net styles of lace that also include Coggeshall lace as well as the Irish laces Limerick and Carrickmacross.

The tambour embroidery technique became popular in western fashion during the 18th century. It was particularly fashionable in the early 19th century when applied to net fabrics, creating a look similar to lace.

== History and origins ==
Tambour embroidery was adapted from the traditional techniques used extensively in areas of Eastern Europe and Asia, such as Persia, India, and China. It can be traced to Ari work of the Kutch region of Gujarat, India, and chain stitch practised in China.

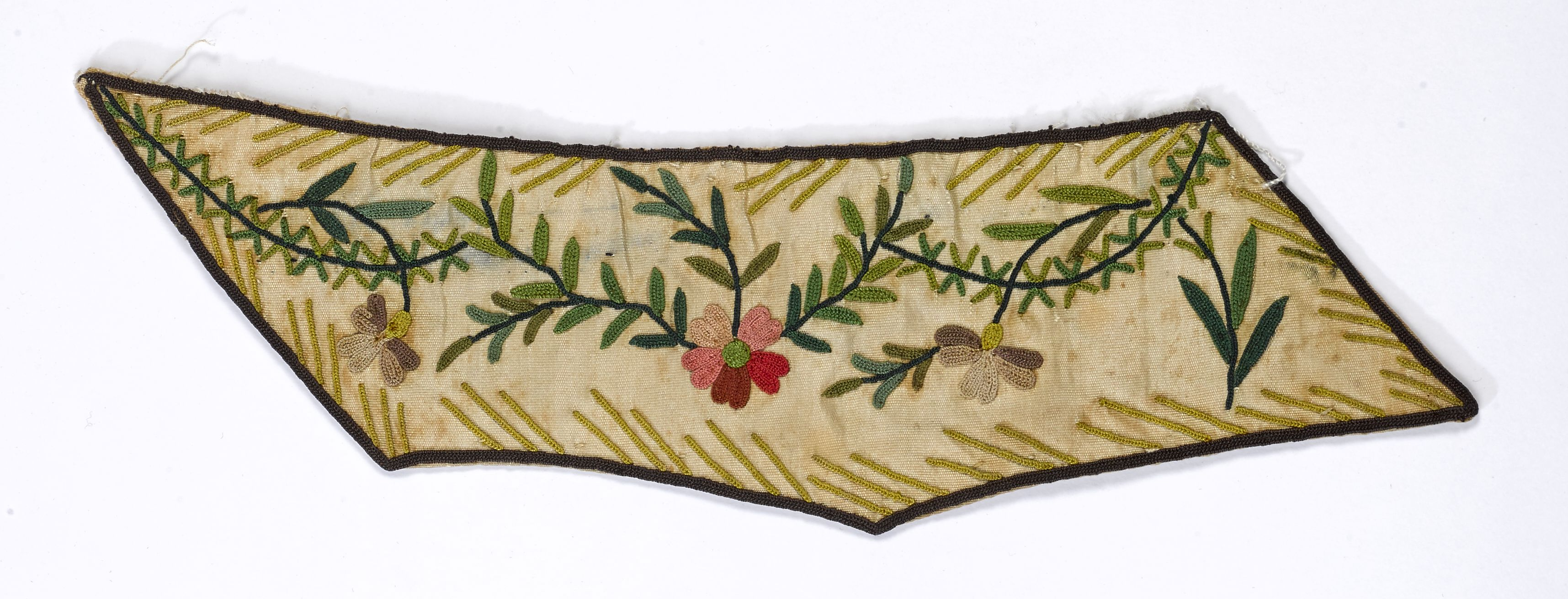
Tambour-worked waistcoat pocket detail, silk, c. 1770–1800. MoMu Fashion Museum Antwerp, ST130C

Textiles and garments of heavy fabrics such as jackets, waistcoats, and gowns featuring tambour embroidery were created in India for export in the 18th century. Pieces in imitation began to be manufactured in the west using adapted embroidery techniques due to the rising popularity of imported garments .

Little is heard of tambour lace until the 1760s when translucent muslins from India, already tamboured with sprigs, were coming into fashion.

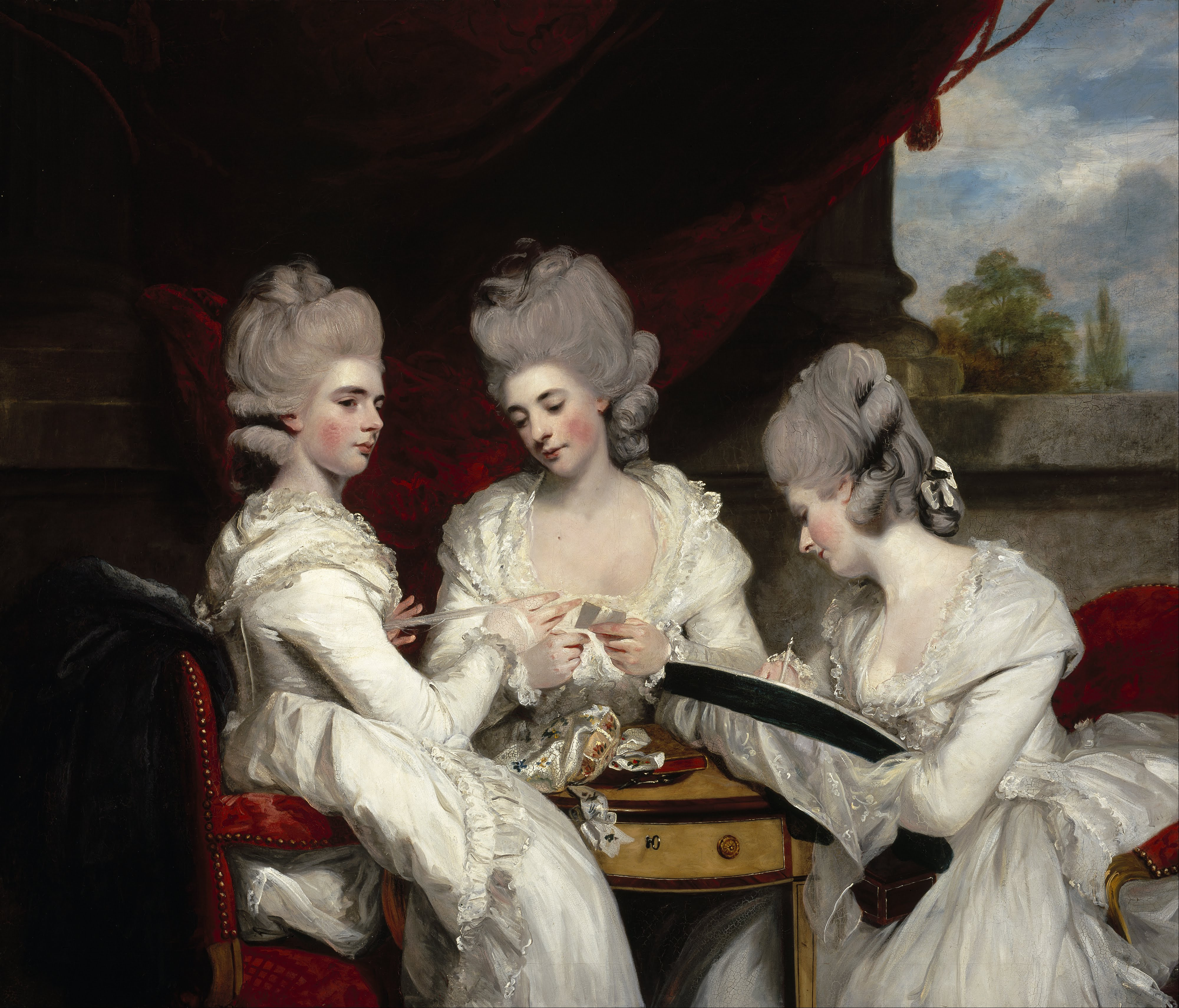
The Ladies Waldegrave by Sir Joshua Reynolds

In the second half of the 18th and into the early 19th century, tambouring was a fashionable pastime for ladies of the French and English courts. It was usually practised on fine muslin, therefore becoming associated with lace, and was known as sewed muslin or flowered muslin.

In western fashion garments and accessories of lightweight textiles were popular through the late 18th to the mid-19th century. Simple chain stitches of the tambour technique embellished clothing with cotton, silk, and silver guilt thread, as well as beads and sequins. Floral motifs and trailing forms reflected the Asian origins of the embroidery style, though much of the tambour work produced for the western market was manufactured in areas such as western Scotland.

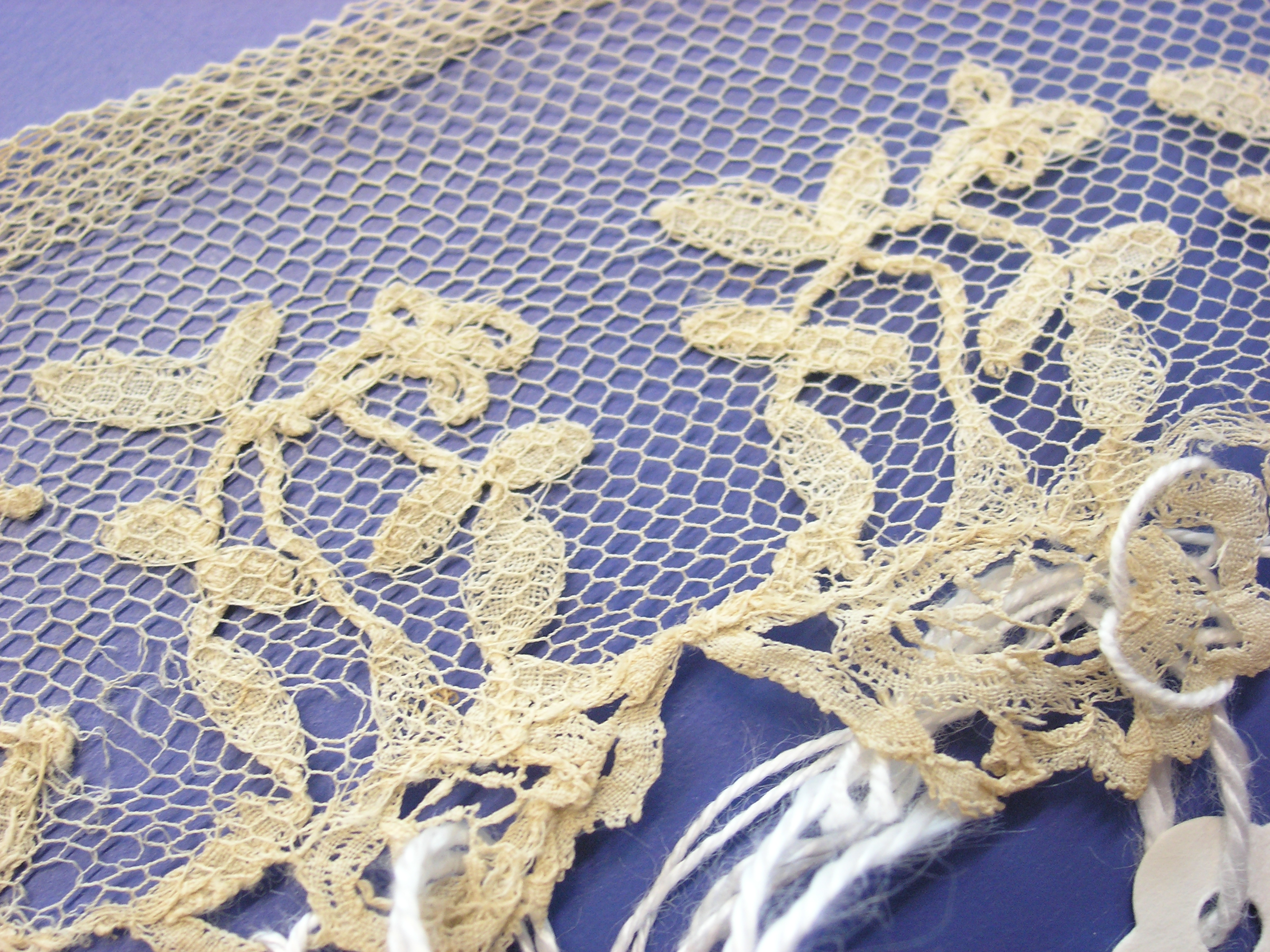
Lace (AM 1962.185-2)

Those creating tambour pieces in Britain, both in past-time and in industry, worked using a circular embroidery frame, adapting techniques from practitioners in India where traditionally tambour-work was created using only the hands. Later examples of the tambour technique were created using machine through technological development, with hand-made tambour-work being recognised as an artisanal craft.

Although tambour is often a surface embroidery, it is used in Limerick lace.

== See also ==
- Sewed muslin
- Embroidery
