= Mrs Jamieson =

English business woman 1800s; introduced sewn muslin

Mrs Jamieson (fl. 1810s), the wife of an Ayr cotton agent, was an enterprising philanthropist who introduced sewed muslin to Ayrshire ca. 1814. Perhaps inspired by Italian Luigi Ruffini, who in 1782 had set up an embroidery school in Edinburgh, she undertook to teach local women the necessary embroidery techniques, allowing them to work as outworkers at the trade. The finished product was widely marketed and exported, especially to North America. Her scheme had so much success that it was later exported to Madeira as relief work.
