= Lochee =

Suburb of the city of Dundee, Scotland

Coordinates: 56.473299°N 3.011276°W

Lochee: Scottish Gaelic: Loch Eighe
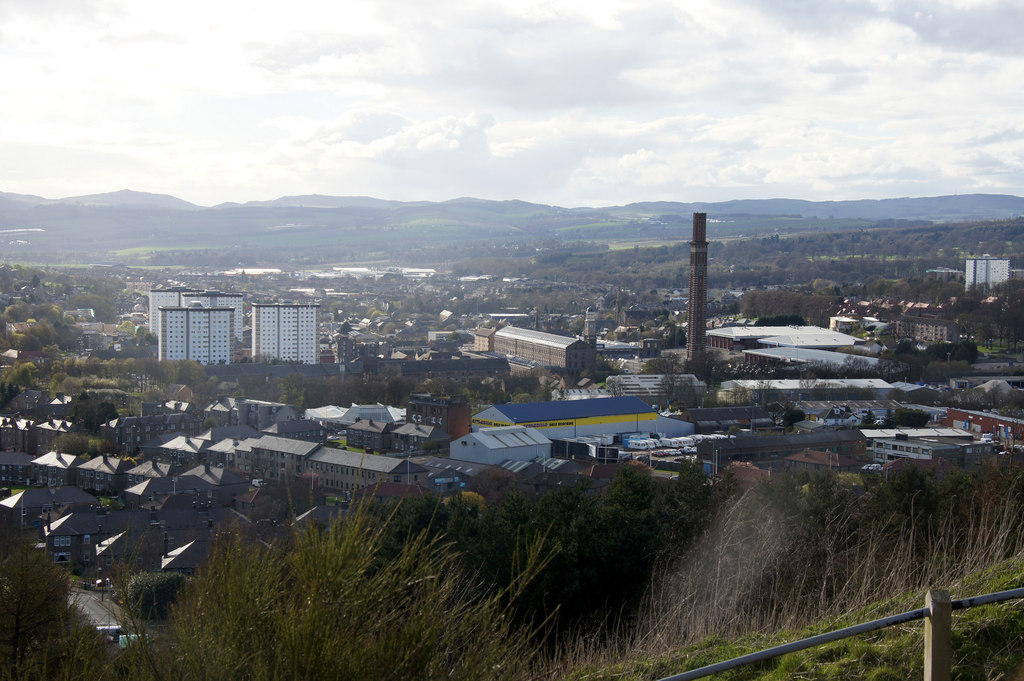

- Location within Dundee City council area Location within Scotland
- Population: 19,722
- OS grid reference: NO378317
- Council area: Dundee City
- Lieutenancy area: Dundee
- Country: Scotland
- Sovereign state: United Kingdom
- Post town: DUNDEE
- Postcode district: DD2
- Dialling code: 01382
- Police: Scotland
- Fire: Scottish
- Ambulance: Scottish
- UK Parliament: Dundee West
- Scottish Parliament: Dundee City West

Lochee (/lɒˈxiː/) is an area in the west of Dundee, Scotland. Until the 19th century, it was a separate town, but was eventually surrounded by the expanding Dundee. It is notable for being home to Camperdown Works, which was the largest jute production site in the world.

== History ==
=== Early history ===
The name Lochee is thought to come from Loch E’e or eye of the loch, referring to a small loch and burn which once ran through the area near Balgay. The site of the original settlement is believed to be close to present-day Myrekirk. Maps from the late 18th century show both Locheye and Lochee as place names.

In the 15th century the loch was drained by the Duncan family, who offered crofting land along the burn. One tenant was James Cox, a Dutch immigrant whose family became known for linen production. By the early 1700s the Cox family were established as linen merchants.

=== 18–19th century ===
By the mid-18th century weaving had become the principal occupation in Lochee, which developed as one of the main weaving districts supplying the linen trade of Dundee. Production largely operated through the domestic putting-out system, in which merchants supplied yarn to handloom weavers working in their own homes and collected the finished cloth for sale.

Around 1760 the Cox family’s linen business reportedly coordinated the work of about 300 weavers in the Lochee area, illustrating the scale of textile production already present in the district.

Historians note that Dundee’s later reputation as “Juteopolis” can obscure this earlier development. By the 1840s the city had already become the United Kingdom’s principal processor of flax and manufacturer of linen cloth, while the term “Juteopolis” itself was not applied to Dundee until 1863. Lochee’s long-established community of handloom weavers therefore provided a ready-made textile workforce when large-scale factory production expanded in the nineteenth century.

During the mid-19th century the growth of mechanised spinning and weaving transformed textile production in the Dundee district. Lochee, already a major weaving community and lying just beyond Dundee’s historic burgh boundary, became a natural location for the large mills that followed.

Lochee grew rapidly during the expansion of the jute industry. In 1849 the Cox Brothers established Camperdown Works, which became the largest jute manufacturing complex in the world and employed thousands of workers.

The best-known surviving feature of the works is Cox’s Stack, an 86-metre (282 ft) chimney whose engineering design is attributed to George Addison Cox, with the decorative architectural treatment by the Dundee architect James MacLaren. Its height, campanile-style form, and decorative brickwork make Cox’s Stack a striking feature of Lochee’s skyline, suggesting it was intended as a landmark as well as an industrial chimney. Cox's Stack is now a Category A listed building.

At its height, Lochee had its own railway stations, police and fire services, schools, library, swimming pool, casino, washhouse and many churches.

Many immigrants were attracted to the area by the prospect of employment in the city's jute mills. By 1855, there were 14,000 Irish immigrants in Dundee, most of whom stayed in Lochee, or 'Little Tipperary' as it would come to be known. In 1904, the Lochee Harp football club was formed by Lochee Irishmen as a means of recreation for the poor immigrants; the club still plays to this day.

In 1866 St Mary’s Catholic Church was opened to serve the growing Catholic community, many of whom were of Irish descent. In 1890 the Cox Brothers gave the community a 25-acre public space, now known as Lochee Park.

=== 20th century ===
The decline of the jute trade in the early 1900s brought hard times to Lochee. Many mills closed, but the area kept a strong sense of community. After the Second World War, old housing was replaced with new estates and high flats, though some of these tower blocks were later pulled down.

St Mary’s Church remained a focal point for local life, reflecting the area’s Irish roots.

=== 21st century ===
Lochee has seen major regeneration in recent years, including work on the High Street, new housing and community facilities.

One of the most notable changes has been the creation of the Stack Leisure Park, a retail and entertainment complex developed on the site of the former Camperdown Works.

Opening in stages from the late 1990s, it brought a cinema, bingo hall, restaurants and shops to the area, helping to replace lost industrial jobs with leisure and retail activity.

In August 2025, Lochee gained worldwide attention after a video of a teenage girl defending herself with weapons in the area’s St Ann Lane went viral online. Although described widely as "misinformation", in February of 2026, charges were brought against a man and woman for assault on the minor.

== Transport ==
Lochee is well connected to other parts of Dundee by public transport, with several bus services operating through the district. Services provided by Xplore Dundee include route 10, linking the area with Ninewells Hospital and Broughty Ferry, route 17 to Whitfield and Ninewells Hospital, and route 28 which runs between Myrekirk (ASDA) and the city centre.

Bus routes – Lochee
Bus route	Primary destinations	Bus stops in Lochee	Service provider
10	Ninewells Hospital; Broughty Ferry	Lochee High Street (near); Sinclair Street (at)	Xplore Dundee
17	Ninewells Hospital; Whitfield	Adamsons Court (at/opp); Ancrum Road (at/opp)	Xplore Dundee
28	Myrekirk (ASDA); City Centre	Lochee High Street (near); Grays Lane (at)	Xplore Dundee
57	Blairgowrie / Wellmeadow	Adamsons Court (at/opp); Ancrum Road (at/opp)	Stagecoach East Scotland

== Education ==
Lochee is served by several primary schools, including Ancrum Road Primary School to the east of the district, and St Mary’s Roman Catholic Primary School, which has long been a central institution for the local Catholic community.

For secondary education, pupils in the area generally attend the nearby St John’s R.C. High School, located on Harefield Road, while non-denominational pupils may attend schools in neighbouring districts depending on catchment arrangements.

== Politics ==
Lochee forms part of Dundee City Council’s Lochee ward, which elects four councillors using the Single Transferable Vote (STV) system.

At the most recent local government election in 2022, the ward returned councillors from both the Scottish National Party (SNP) and the Labour Party, reflecting the competitive political landscape of the area.

At the parliamentary level, Lochee lies within the Dundee West constituency for both the Scottish Parliament and the UK Parliament, seats which have traditionally been contested between Labour and the SNP, with the SNP currently holding both.

== Notable residents ==
Main page: Category:People from Lochee

== Demographics ==
The 2022 Census recorded a population of 19,722 in the Lochee ward, a slight rise from 2011. Covering 10.6 square kilometres, this gives a population density of about 1,865 people per square kilometre.

Lochee has one of the highest levels of deprivation in Dundee. In 2020, more than half of residents lived in areas ranked among the 5 per cent most deprived in Scotland, while over 80 per cent lived in the most deprived fifth. Child poverty rates were even higher.
