= Sewed muslin =

Embroidery artwork on fine muslin

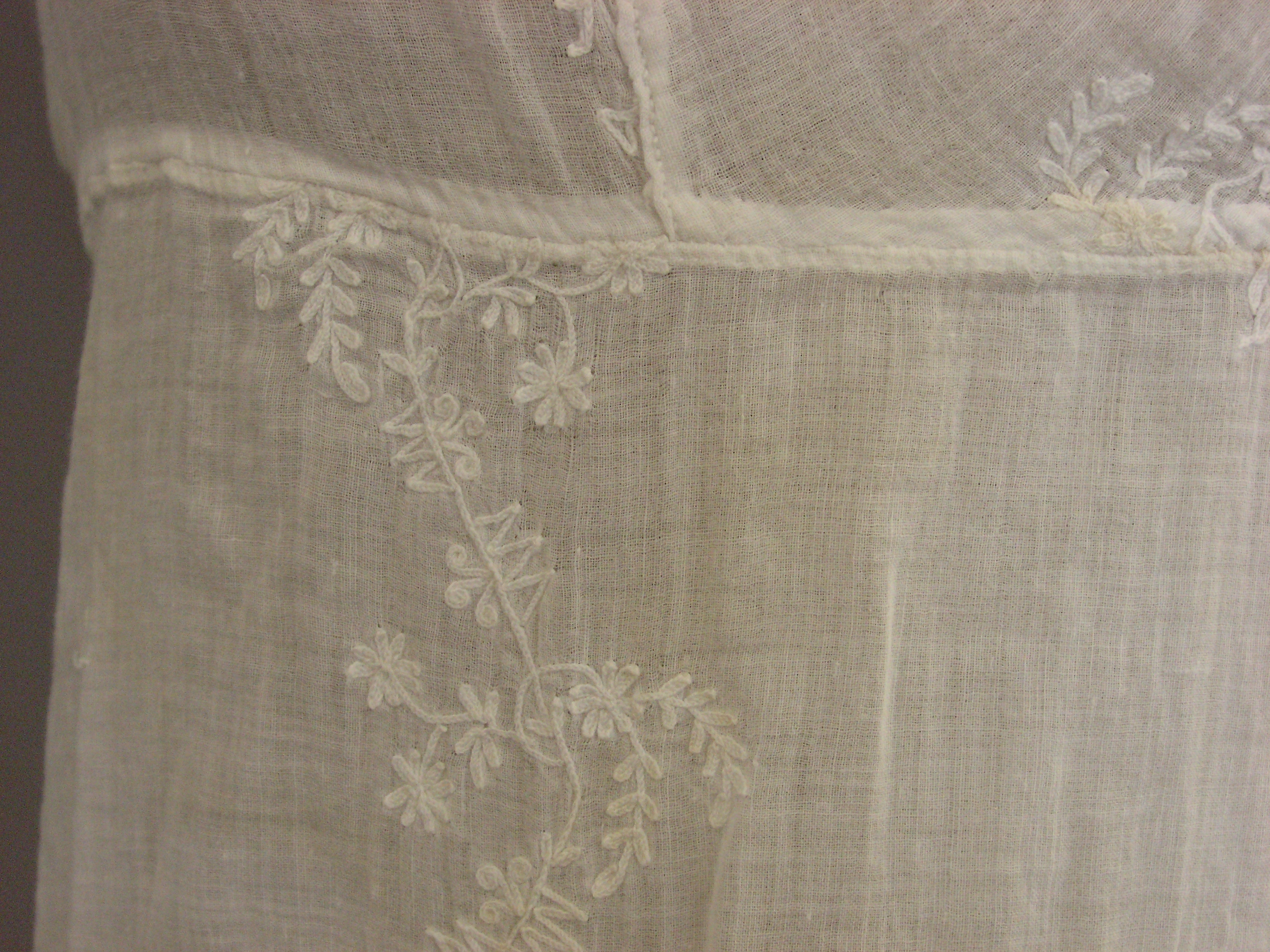
Detail of a flowered muslin dress, ca. 1805.

Sewed muslin was a fashion imported from Paris in the late 18th century. Related to tambour lace, it was worked on very fine muslin, and used a variety of stitches to create motifs, usually depicting flowers and plants (hence its other name, flowered muslin).

== Sewed muslin industry in Scotland ==
A notable developer of the industry in Scotland was Mrs Jamieson, the wife of an Ayrshire cotton agent. Seeing a philanthropic opportunity, she set out to teach local farmers' wives and daughters the trade, focusing on firm satin stitch, overcast fillings, and fine lace stitches in cut-out spaces. The designs were drawn up by professional draughtsmen in Glasgow before being sent out to be embroidered by outworkers. They were then bleached, made up, boxed and widely marketed, proving especially popular in North America.

In 1791, the industry provided (often part-time) employment to as many as 105,000 women and children in Scotland, or approximately 86% of the entire workforce. The impact of the industry on the local population was noted by the minister of Houston, Renfrewshire in the 1790s, when he wrote that it allowed many young women "not only [to] maintain themselves, but [to] buy fineries."

The muslins used in this industry came largely from local mills: the first cotton mills had been built in west Scotland in the 1770s, and by the 1780s the quality was high enough to supply the demand for fine white muslins, which became de rigueur to achieve the neo-classical style of dress.

The Ayrshire whitework industry was a victim of its own success, starting to decline from the 1830s onwards, after the patenting of the first embroidery machine in 1828, which allowed similar motifs to be produced at a fraction of the cost. It continued in popularity until the 1850s, when a combination of over-production and cotton shortages imposed by the American Civil War saw to its demise.

Sewed muslin from the wider Glasgow area came to be known as Ayrshire whitework, and is extremely similar to French whitework. The main difference between them is that French whitework is usually worked on cambric rather than muslin.
