= Jute industry in Bangladesh =

The jute industry is a historically and culturally important industry in Bangladesh dating back to during the growth of the East India Company in the Indian subcontinent. Despite once being one of the country's biggest industries and major export items, the jute industry has declined since the 1970s. Exports have fallen as other countries grow jute independently, decreasing the demand for jute to be exported, and other products like plastics and hemp find more widespread use.

As of 2021, Bangladesh holds the position of the second-largest producer of jute, accounting for 42 percent of total worldwide production, and leading in jute exports.

== History ==
=== Pre-colonial and colonial eras (before 1971) ===
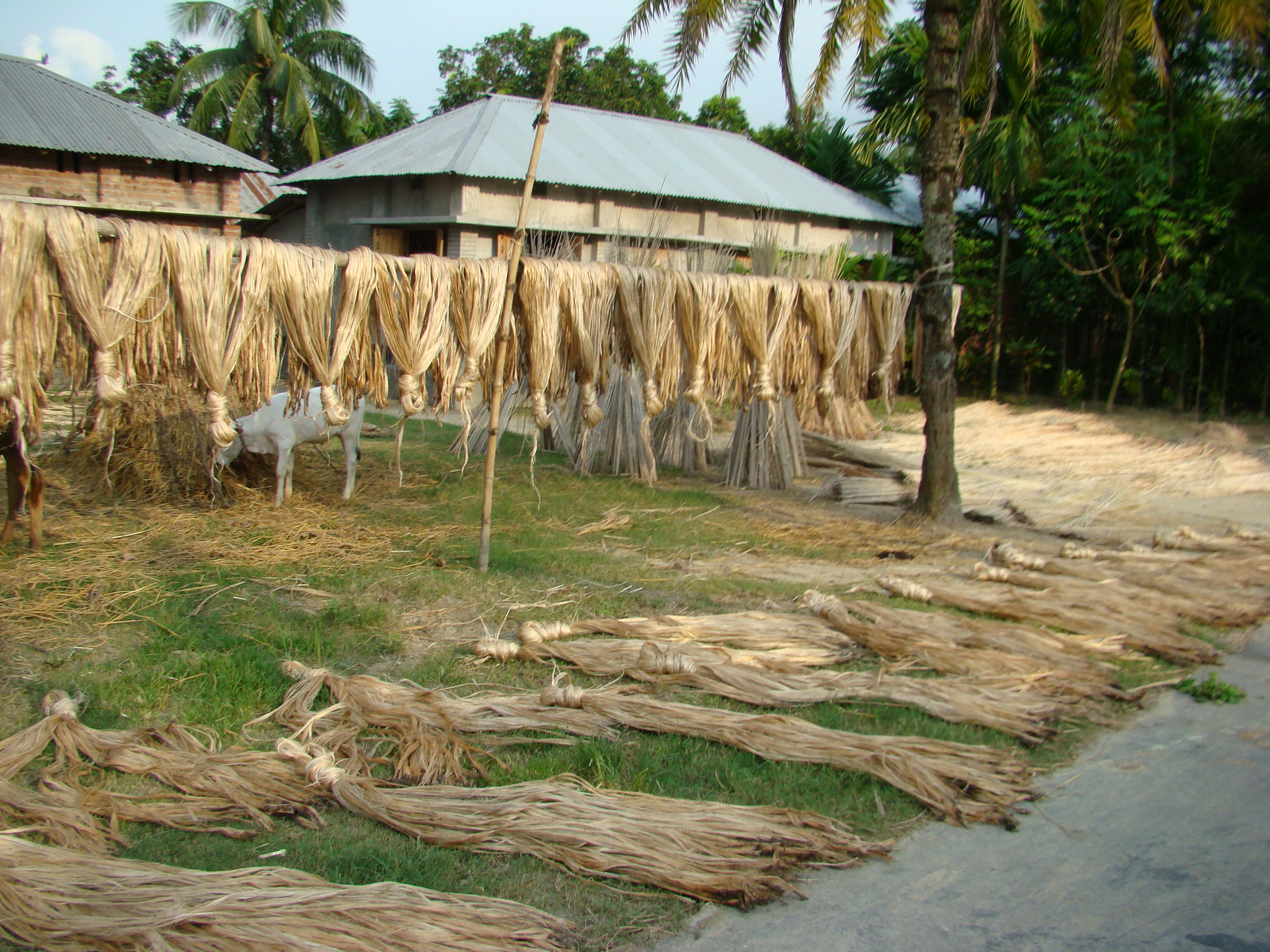
Drying jute fibre

Prior to the mid-nineteenth century, jute produced in Bengal was made into rope and clothing using local hand-looms. During the Napoleonic Wars (1803–1815), British supply of Russian flax ran short, and British mills considered jute as a potential alternative. However, manufacturing jute fabric in existing British industrial mills proved difficult, as jute was too coarse for the machines. The Balfour and Melville firms developed a process to weaken the fabric using water and whale fat. In 1838, Dundee mills received an order to manufacture sacks for sugar plantations in Dutch-controlled Java, so the mills produced jute burlap sacks using the Balfour and Melville methods. This generated demand and promoted Bengal-produced jute. Demand further increased following the Crimean War (1853–1856).

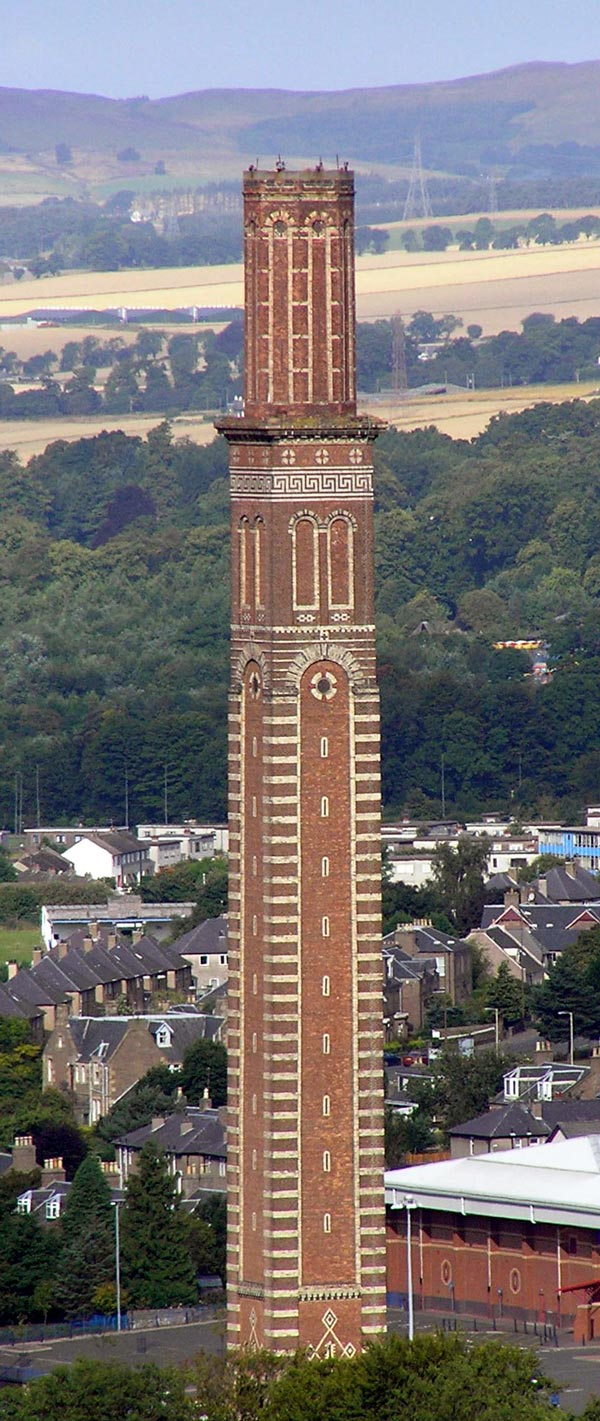
Dundee, Scotland, The 86m tall Camperdown Works Chimney known as Cox's Stack, built 1865-6, engineering design by George Addison Cox, a monumental reminder of the Industrial revolution in Scotland, now a Category A Listed Building visible on the city’s skyline.

During the nineteenth century the city of Dundee in Scotland became the principal centre of mechanised jute manufacture within the British Empire. Large integrated mills such as Camperdown Works processed imported fibre from Bengal and exported finished goods to global markets.

Thus, when the first jute mill was set up in Bengal, Dundee mills were already well-established and opening up new markets for their products. But the Kolkata industry made rapid progress once it started its journey.

In 1855, George Auckland, along with Bengali partner Shyamsunder Sen, established the first jute mill at Rishra, along the banks of the Hooghly River.

The Union blockade during the American Civil War restricted the supply of cotton from the Confederate States of America and made it necessary for British mills to find an alternative input. Jute was a good alternative, as it was relatively cheaper and could be sourced from a British colony. In 1873, the British Raj formed a commission led by H.C. Kerr to investigate the jute industry and jute cultivation in Bangladesh. They published a "Report on the Cultivation of, and Trade in, Jute in Bengal" in 1877. This report suggested that large-scale jute cultivation in the Bengal region could have begun in the 1840s.

In the later half of the 19th century, jute mills were opened around Kolkata, where worker numbers rapidly grew. By 1882, there were 18 mills, and by 1901, there were 51, with over ten thousand workers employed. The majority of the jute manufactured in the mills was exported to Australia, New Zealand, and the United States. The jute industry had become the second largest industry in British India after the cotton industry, and Kolkata became the centre of the jute trade. The majority of the factories were located outside Kolkata and were owned by foreigners.

In the 1920s, jute prices rose dramatically, leading to increased production. Jute prices fell in the 1930s, despite the Indian Jute Mills Association attempting to slow the price decline by reducing work hours. The British Raj formed the Bengal Jute Inquiry Committee to create reports on the state of the jute industry in Bangladesh during the Great Depression. The Committee published two reports: one in 1934, and another in 1939. The reports studied the cycle of lower production and higher prices one year and higher production and lower prices the next. It was recommended in 1940 that the government restrict the production of jute.

During World War II, jute production increased, and by the end of the war, there were 111 jute mills in the region. Jute production took place in East Bengal, while all 108 jute mills were located in West Bengal. After the Partition of India, where West Bengal went to India and East Bengal to Pakistan, jute production faced difficulties: East Bengal was left with no jute mills available. From 1947 to 1948, there was free trade between India and Pakistan, until India declared Pakistan a foreign country and imposed border control. Pakistan then began to develop its own jute mills in East Bengal. India and Pakistan attempted to continue the jute trade between East and West Bengal, despite both attempting to become self-sufficient in the production and processing of jute. India focused on domestic cultivation, while Pakistan focused on processing by encouraging domestic entrepreneurs to establish jute mills in East Bengal.

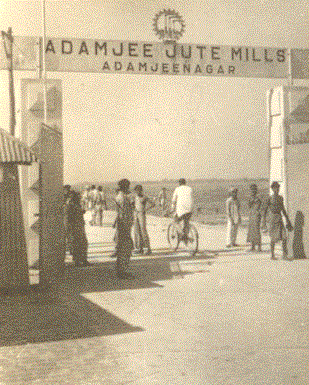
Entrance of Adamjee Jute Mills

Bawa Jute Mills Ltd., Adamjee Jute Mills, and Victory Jute Products Limited were established in East Bengal in 1951. Adamjee Jute Mills was built with financial support from the Pakistan Industrial Development Corporation. By 1960, the number of jute mills in East Bengal had increased to 14, and 12 of them were supported by Pakistan Industrial Development Corporation. The majority of these mills were founded by non-Bengalis. This generated some tension and prompted the Bengali government to encourage more Bengali entrepreneurs. Abul Kashem Khan, the Minister of Industry, developed a plan to divide the Pakistan Industrial Development Corporation into two new corporations, called West Pakistan Industrial Development Corporation and East Pakistan Industrial Development Corporation, to encourage more entrepreneurs from East Pakistan.

The East Pakistan Industrial Development Corporation lowered the minimum number of looms required to open a factory and encouraged small Bengali entrepreneurs. This increased the number of jute mills owned by Bengalis. By 1970, East Pakistan had 77 jute mills, employing 170 thousand people. Pakistan earned 77 million rupees from the export of jute from East Pakistan and became the world's largest exporter of jute. Jute as percentage of foreign revenue increased from 0.2 percent in 1952 to 46 percent in 1970.

=== Post-colonial era (1971–present) ===
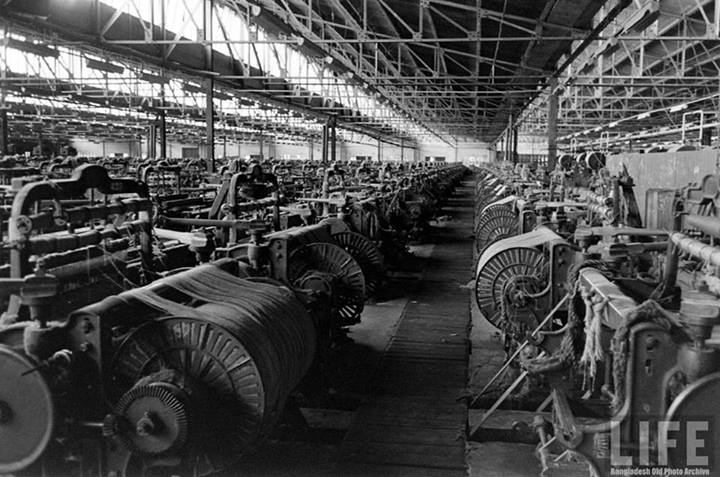
Machinery inside Adamjee Jute Mills

After the Bangladesh Liberation War and East Pakistan's independence, West Pakistan jute mill owners left the country, abandoning their facilities. The government of Bangladesh ordered the Bangladesh Jute Board to take over the empty mills and appointed administrators for them. The administrators proved to be inept because they were appointed through political connections. In 1972, the government, having added socialism to the constitution of Bangladesh, nationalised all industries, including jute. The nationalised jute mills were placed under the Bangladesh Jute Mills Corporation. Adamjee Jute Mills suffered from management problems after nationalisation. In addition, there was absenteeism and issues with union groups.

Bangladesh Jute Mills Corporation was given the task of controlling the price, purchase, and sale of jute in Bangladesh. In the 1970s, rising costs, the devaluation of the taka, and internal corruption led to Bangladesh Jute Mills Corporation incurring significant financial losses. In 1973, the Government established the Jute Division and placed it under the Ministry of Finance. In 1976, the Jute Division was turned into the Ministry of Jute.

In 1979, a government committee recommended that the government privatise the mills. From 1979 to 1980, three jute mills were returned to their previous owners and two were privatised. In the 1980s, the government provided subsidiaries and export bonuses to stimulate the industry. In 1982, Bangladesh returned 35 mills to private owners.

In 1990, the World Bank recommended that Bangladesh appoint a firm to study the condition of the jute industry in 1990. According to the firm's study, the jute industry had a liability of 20.75 billion taka with local banks, a liability almost 13 billion taka from state-owned jute mills under Bangladesh Jute Mills Corporation, and other remaining liabilities held by private jute mills. The study recommended reduction in capacity and privatisation of all government-held jute mills. The World Bank offered a $250 million USD loan to implement these recommendations. Bangladesh shut down four mills and made funds available to state-owned mills so that they could reduce their workforce. These changes did not reduce losses for the jute mills and the government failed to turn profit. The private jute mills were also under-performing, and two were shut down.

The jute grown in Bangladesh is now used to produce Hessian fabric, jute carpets, and sacks.

== Current state ==
In 2002, the government shut down Adamjee Jute Mills, the largest jute mill in Bangladesh. Despite this, remaining jute mills still fail to make profits, creating concerns for the government. By 2006, the government of Bangladesh had shares in 78 percent of jute mills in Bangladesh, owning 29 mills completely. In 2010, the Government of Bangladesh made it mandatory for wholesale manufacturers and sellers to pack rice, sugar, wheat, and fertilisers in jute bags. This requirement was expanded to include animal feed in 2018.

In 2018, Bangladesh Jute Mills Corporation recommended the Ministry of Jute and Textiles form a 100 billion taka fund, named the Jute Sector Development Fund, to develop the jute industry and provide low cost loans. The jute industry exports around one billion dollars' worth of jute from Bangladesh every year. In January 2018, the Government of Bangladesh imposed a ban on the export of raw or unprocessed jute to ensure adequate supply for the local market. The ban was lifted in June 2019 following the demands of the Bangladesh Jute Association.

From 2010 to 2019, the Government of Bangladesh has given about 7.5 billion taka to the Bangladesh Jute Mills Corporation. The corporation has not been able to turn profit, and it has been experiencing losses every year since 1980 with the exception of 2010-11 fiscal year. In 2019, The Daily Star described the Bangladesh Jute Mills Corporation as a "bottomless pit".

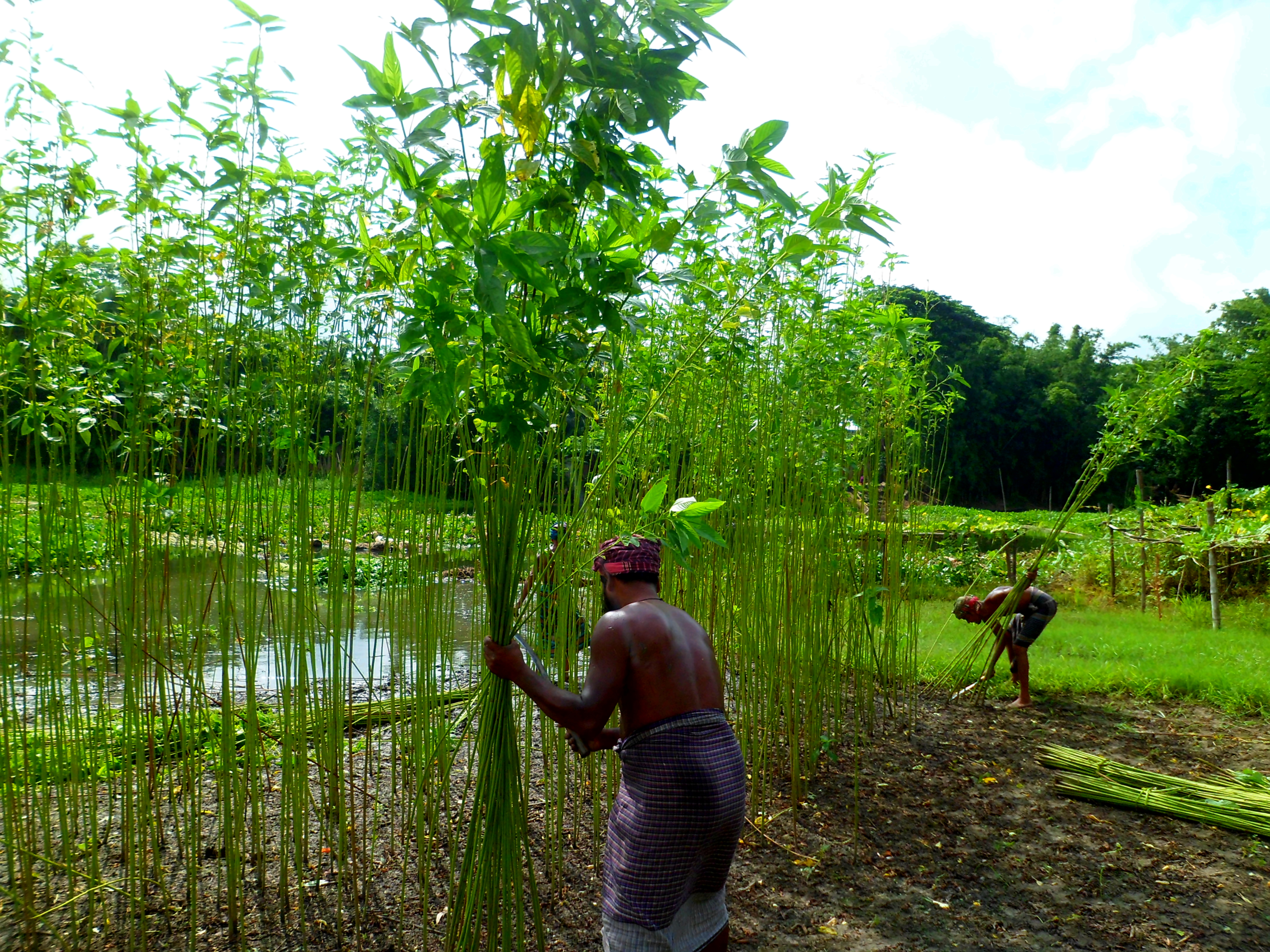
Jute plants being harvested

The private sector in Bangladesh are taking a renewed interest in jute as demand for biodegradable and sustainable natural fabric grows. Khiyoo Fashion House, a Bangladeshi company, produces garments and shoes using jute. In 2017, India imposed anti-dumping tariffs on jute hessian fabric, bags and yarn. In 2019, India expanded anti-dumping tariffs by imposing $125.21 USD on per tonne of jute sacks. This led to concerns being expressed by Bangladesh Jute Mills Association and Bangladesh Jute Spinners Association as India was a major destination for Bangladeshi jute. Janata Jute Mills and Akij Jute Mills remain as the two largest private jute mills in Bangladesh.

== Research ==
The Bangladesh Jute Research Institute, founded in 1936, is a government research institute and the oldest corporate research institute in Bangladesh. It was founded by the Indian Central Jute Committee in Dhaka Farms as the Jute Research Laboratory. It was upgraded by the Pakistan Central Jute Committee and renamed to the Jute Research Institute in 1951. In 2010, a research team decoded the genome of jute. The team was led by Maqsudul Alam, a Bangladeshi professor at the University of Hawaii, and included researchers from the Jute Research Institute, Datasoft, and the University of Dhaka.

NatUp Fibres, a company based in Normandy, France, has researched using jute to make interior components for cars. Currently, the components are made from flax, which is relatively more expensive. Golden Fibres Trade Centre exports Bangladeshi jute to car manufacturers in Germany. As of 2018, Bangladesh meets about 10 percent of the automobile industries demand for jute.

In 2018, the chief scientific officer at Bangladesh Jute Mills Corporation, Dr Mubarak Ahmad Khan, developed a jute-based polymer that could be used to manufacture biodegrade plastic bags called Sonali Bags.

== See also ==
- Jade trade in Myanmar
- Jute production in India
