= Jute trade =

Plant fiber industry

The jute trade is centered mainly around India's West Bengal and Assam, and Bangladesh. The major producing country of jute is India and biggest exporter is Bangladesh, due to their natural fertile soil. Production of jute by India and Bangladesh are respectively 1.968 million ton and 1.349 million metric ton. Bengal jute was exported to South East Asia from the 17th century by the Dutch, French and later by other Europeans.

By the 1790s a small export had developed to the Scottish city of Dundee, where the flax spinning industry could use a small percentage of jute to lower costs. Thomas Neigh, a Dundee merchant invented the mechanical process of spinning jute in 1833 by first soaking it in whale oil. British merchants exported raw jute from Bengal in increasing quantities from the 1840s to replace flax in the Dundee mills.

Dundee, employing more than half the population in the mills, became the global centre of the industry, and earned the nickname "Juteopolis."

In 1858, Indian financiers supported the importation of spinning machinery from Dundee in order to create their own industry, and by 1895, jute industries in Bengal overtook the Scottish jute trade. Many Scots worked in Bengal to set up jute factories for Indians, dominated by Marwari brokers such as G. D. Birla.

Today, nearly 75% of jute goods are packaging materials, such as burlap sacks. Problems such as obsolete machinery, strikes and lock-outs, and a lack of innovation have seen the Indian industry stagnate since independence. Jute coffee bags are perhaps the most famous product, known as hessian or burlap. These sacks found a military use starting in the Crimean War, and then in World War I the British War Office awarded their entire 1916 contract for sandbags to a Greek-Indian firm in Calcutta. It has been used in the fishing, construction, art and in the arms industry. India has the bulk of the jute industry (60%), but the raw jute comes mainly from Bangladesh which is the second-largest producer of jute products.

Carpet backing cloth (CBC), the third major jute outlet, is quickly growing in prominence. Currently it accounts for roughly 15% of the world's jute consumption globally. Other common jute products behind CBC are carpet yarn, cordage, padding, felts, decorative fabrics, and miscellaneous heavy-duty items for industrial use.

As more countries make efforts to reduce or ban plastic usage for consumer bagging, jute bags take a greater share of the market. India produces 60% of global jute products; however, problems such as lack of investment, water shortage, poor quality seeds, and loss of crop land to urbanisation slow its growth as a biodegradable substitute for materials such as plastic which contribute to pollution.

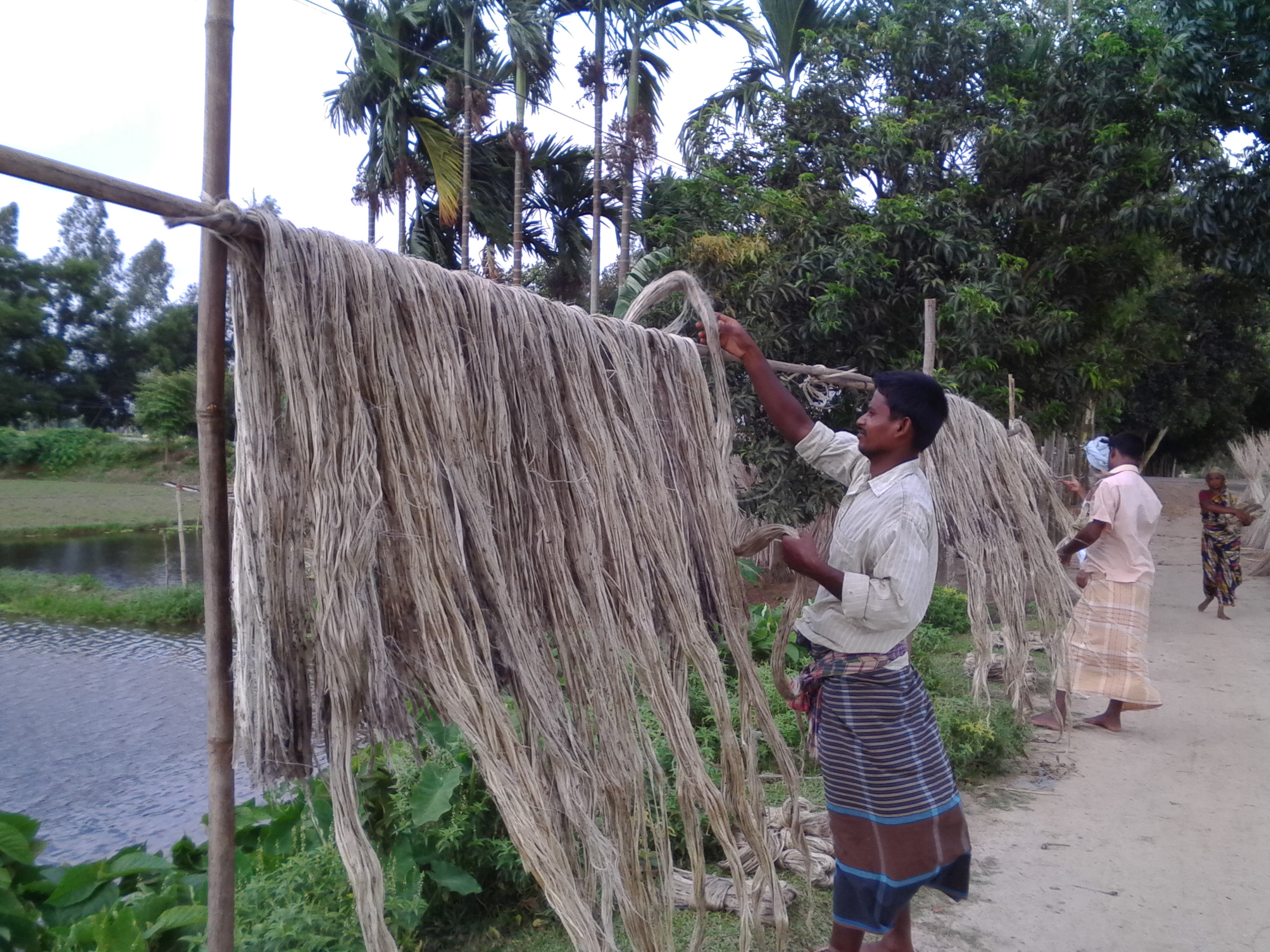
Bangladesh's jute cultivation

== History ==
Jute has been grown in the East Bengal region for centuries. It was produced for domestic consumption in the villages of present-day Bangladesh and West Bengal.

Jute was used for rope production until the modern era, but the creation of the Jute Industry led to the collapse of Indian handloom jute in the 1880s. In the 1850s roughly £250,000 of jute products were exported annually.

Jute was an export material demanded by South East Asia which was fulfilled by Indian and European trading firms.

The modern jute industry was not invented until 1833 in Dundee, but small quantities were used in flax and hemp spinning after 1790.

By the early part of the twentieth century, there were huge increases of finished jute exports and a massive reduction in the export of raw jute. India was gaining around £35 million per annum from processed goods, with only £8m earned by sales of raw jute to Brazil, New York, Japan, Germany and the United Kingdom.

Partition meant that 75% of the Jute growing areas were in Pakistan, but all 106 mills, the baling centres and export hubs were in India. Jute was the subject of the first inter-Dominion agreement, however, the devaluation of the Indian rupee and Pakistani demands for a share of the export tariff led to break downs.

250,000 workers were directly employed in the industry, supporting 4 million peasants and providing 20% of India's foreign earnings. Despite this, a long depression ensued due to the politics involved and the oligopolistic practice of the Indian Jute Mills Association.

The long depression in Jute is partly attributed to the exploitation by the Indian Jute barons who only pursued short term profit after purchasing the British invented and developed mills. Jute mills continue to close, 8 in the last few years, down to 55. Migrant workers have left the state, wages have not increased and strikes have been commonplace.

== Jute traders ==
=== East India Company ===
The British East India Company was the British Empire Authority delegated in Bengal from the 17th century until dissolved in 1857. The Dutch and the French were the first jute traders.

The company began exporting gunny sacks to South East Asia during the seventeenth and eighteenth century.

In the 1830s Thomas Neigh imported jute to Dundee and experimented using flax spinning machines to make cloth. This was not initially successful, but used as a small mixture with flax until they discovered that whale oil made it soft enough to be spun.

Demand for jute skyrocketed as its use in sacks, ropes, and cloth displaced flax.

Between 1833 and 1855, Bengal saw a boom in growing jute, but a decline in its cottage hand spinning.

In 1855 George Acland was financed by Bysamber Sen to import Dundee fabric spinning machinery (and whale oil) to start the first factory in India at Serampore.

Although a failure, he inspired the Borneo Company to start a steam-powered weaving and spinning mill in 1857, and soon a dozen companies began production for domestic Indian use and export to the east.

By 1908 Calcutta was the world's largest jute producer, having defeated Dundee. From the 1890s the Marwaris had entered the market as brokers (like the Birla group) and became the dominant owners of an industry employing over 300,000 workers.

=== Bangladeshi jute traders ===
Being a major player in the long history of jute trade and having finest natural fibre, Bangladesh has always had an advantage in raw jute trading. Bangladesh is still the largest producer and exporter of raw jute in the world. After the separation of Bangladesh (East Pakistan) with the breakup of British created East and West Pakistan (styled itself Pakistan) in 1971, the jute trading was not limited to specific groups in South Asia. After the independence of Bangladesh, most privately owned jute mills were nationalised under the socialist policies of the Awami League government.

Later, to control these jute mils in Bangladesh, the government built up Bangladesh Jute Mills Corporation (BJMC). No other jute mills were allowed to grow in the private sector before 1975. After Ziaur Rahman became Bangladesh president a new age dawned upon the Bangladesh jute industry. This incident grew many raw jute traders from different corners of Bangladesh who used to supply raw jute to BJMC owned jute mills. This group of traders are called Beparis, who buy raw jute directly from the farmers.

Bangladesh Jute Mills Corporation (BJMC), a public corporation in Bangladesh, is the largest state owned manufacturing and exporting organisation in the world in the jute sector.

BJMC owns and operates a number of jute mills around Bangladesh:

- Dhaka Zone: Bengal Jute Industries Limited, Pride Jute Mills Ltd (established: 2003), Golden Jute Industries Ltd (established: 2012) Bangladesh Jute Mills, Karim Jute Mills, Latif Bawany Jute Mills, U.M.C Jute Mills, Janata Jute Mills, Qaumi Jute Mills, Rajshahi Jute Mills. Mony Jute Goods Handicrafts and textiles.
- Khulna Zone: Afil Jute Mills Ltd, Aleem Jute Mills, Carpeting Jute Mills, Crescent Jute Mills, Eastern Jute Mills, Jessore Jute Industries, Peoples Jute Mills, Platinum Jubilee Jute Mills, Star Jute Mills
- Chittagong Zone: Amin Jute Mills, Amin Old Field, Gul Ahmed Jute Mills, Hafiz Jute Mills, Karnafuli Jute Mills, Development of Decorative Fabric, M.M. Jute Mills, R.R. Jute Mills, Bagdad-Dhaka Carpet Factory, Furat Karnafuli Carpet Factory

BJMC also operates mills that do not deal in jute, including Galfra Habib Ltd., Mills Furnishing Ltd. and Jute-Fibre Glass Industry.

Jute cultivation and jute trade in Bangladesh are sectors where significant incidence of child labour has been observed and recorded in the 2014 TVPRA List issued by the Bureau of International Labor Affairs.

=== Dundee Jute ===
The entrepreneurs of the Dundee jute industry in Scotland were called the Jute Barons.

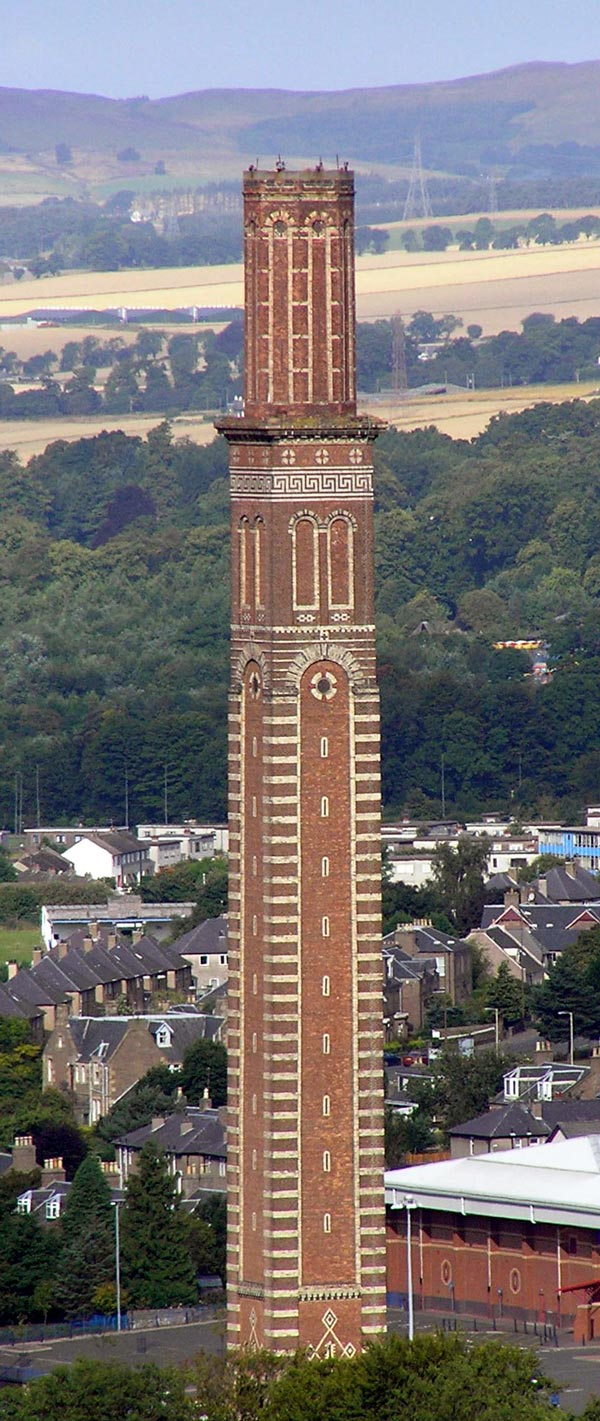
Cox's Stack, a Category A Listed Building in Dundee, Camperdown Works, designed by George Addison Cox with James MacLaren, built 1865-6, visible on the city’s skyline.

Dundee was a centre of flax spinning and the whale oil industry. They realised that jute could be mechanically spun if whale oil was added.

They created a huge new industry making bags for the transport of goods like coffee and as sandbags. By the later nineteenth century, as part of the wider Industrial Revolution in Scotland, Dundee had become the principal centre of jute manufacture within the British Empire and one of the largest producers worldwide, with production, shipping, engineering and finance closely interconnected within the city’s economy.

Among the largest of the city’s jute manufacturing complexes was Camperdown Works in Dundee, developed from 1850 by the firm of Cox Brothers to the engineering design of George Addison Cox; by the late nineteenth century it had become the largest jute works in the world and its great chimney, Cox’s Stack, completed in 1866,, is now a Category A listed building, a monument of the city’s jute industry and a prominent symbol of Dundee’s past industrial landscape.

The Dundee jute industry started to decline when the machinery manufacturers sold the machinery to Indian merchants who benefitted from easier access to raw materials and lower pay.

This is a famous example of free trade in which the liberal government was elected to not enact trade barriers allowing the Calcutta industry to win.

Given that the "Dundee Jute Barons" had ownership stakes in Calcutta and Dundee, the decline in Scotland was not so burdensome on them. Over 50% of the workers in Dundee were in Jute and two-thirds were women, much of the remainder were children because they could be paid less.

The boom had led to slums, over crowding, poor working conditions and low pay.

=== Post-independence in India ===
The Indian Jute Mills Association is the apex body controlling the Indian trade.

Birla is the most famous business giant in India which began as a Jute broker.

The Birla family is Marwari along with Mittal and Bajaj. Indian Jute is considered to be dominated by Marwari.

The industry has faced considerable trouble, for example, a mill owner was murdered by his workers in 2015 when he proposed cutting down hours. 6 such murders have occurred in recent years.

The Jute Industry in India depends on government purchase. Since the millennium government procurement for mandatory packaging in jute has decreased and is only now being reversed - at the consumer level – by the plastic ban.

=== Pakistani Jute Traders Pre-1971 ===
After independence from British colonial rule, East Bengal with possessing the finest jute fibre stock, lacked an effective industrialised jute manufacturing. Several groups of mainly Gujarati clans came into the jute industrialisation business by setting up several jute mills in Chittagong, Khulna, Dhaka and Narayanganj.

Among these families, the most significant ones are:

- The Bawanis
- The Adamjees
- The Ispahanis
- The Sattars
- The Maniyas
- The Khans

== See also ==
- International Jute Study Group
