= Jute production in India =

Jute cultivation and production in India

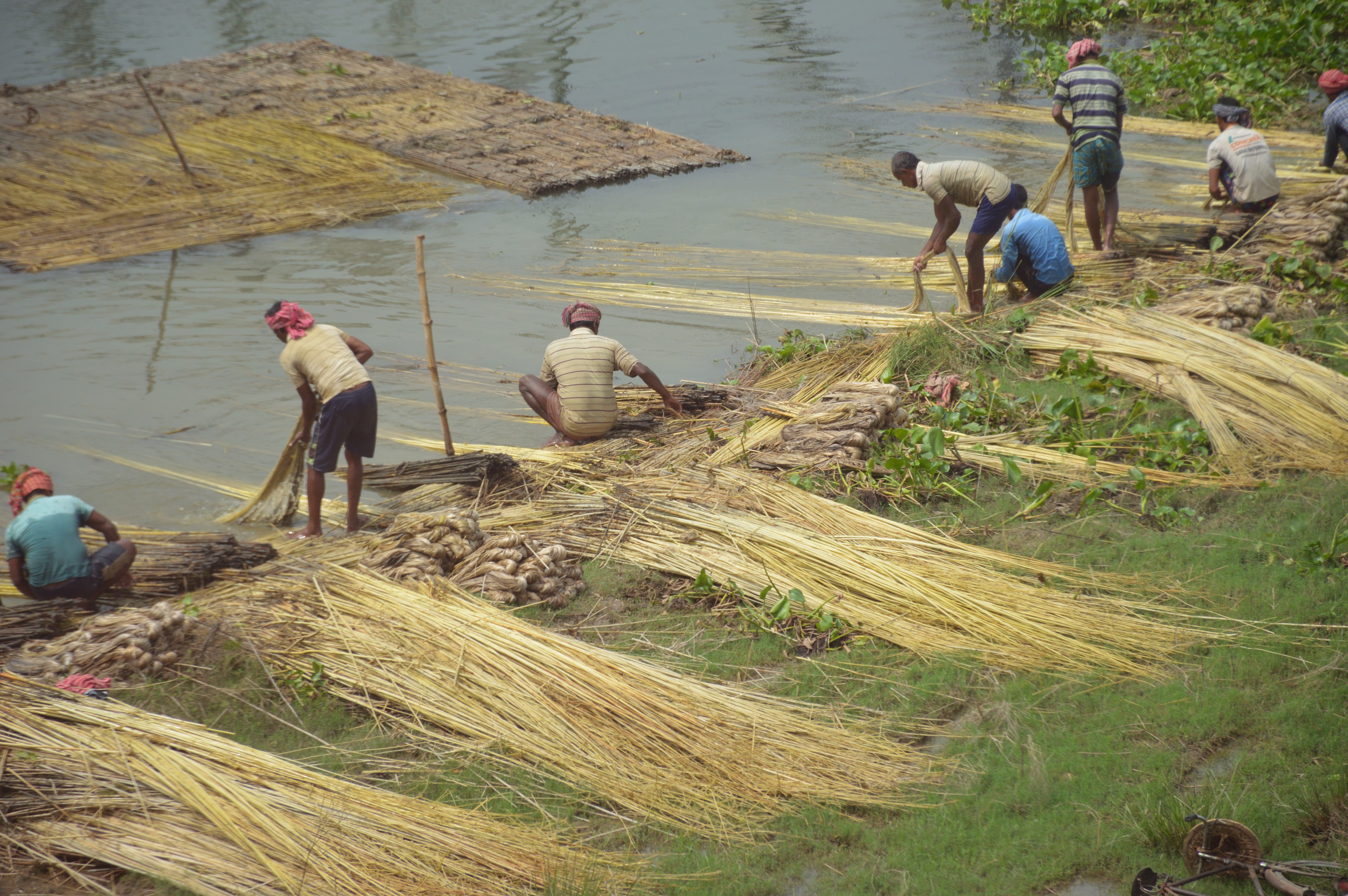
Jute Extraction From Retted Jute Stem in Nadia, West Bengal

Jute production in India is integral to the country’s agricultural and industrial economy. India is the world’s largest producer of jute, accounting for about 75% of estimated world production. Jute is a natural fiber obtained from plants of the genus Corchorus, and is widely used for making sacks, mats, ropes, and eco-friendly packaging materials.

Jute production is a labour-intensive industry. It employs about two lakh workers in West Bengal and 4 lakh workers across the country.

== History ==
Jute has been used for making textiles in the Indus valley civilization since the 3rd millennium BC. A preserved structure of jute on a ceramic artifact from the site of Harappa that is dated to 2200–1900 BC was found.

For centuries, jute has been a part of the culture of some parts of West Bengal and Assam. The British started trading in jute during the seventeenth century. During the reign of the British Raj, jute was also used in the army. The first jute mill started production in Bengal in 1856. British jute barons grew rich by processing jute and started selling manufactured products made from it. Dundee Jute Barons and the British East India Company set up many jute mills in Bengal, and by 1895 jute industries in Bengal overtook the Scottish jute trade. Many Scots emigrated to Bengal to set up jute factories.

After the Partition of India, many jute-growing areas became part of Bangladesh (East Pakistan), while most processing mills remained in India. This led to initial shortages of raw jute. To solve this crisis, the Indian government launched the "Grow More Jute" campaign in September 1949, encouraging farmers to grow jute instead of paddy. Later, the Jute Packaging Act of 1987 boosted the industry by mandating the use of jute sacks for packaging essential goods, which guaranteed a steady market for Indian jute farmers.

As of 2020, India has produced 1,807,264 tonnes of jute. Currently, there are 70 jute mills in India, of which about 60 are in West Bengal along the banks of Hooghly River.

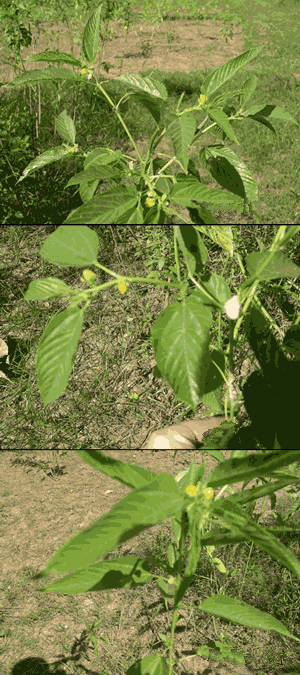
Jute plants (Corchorus olitorius and Corchorus capsularis)

== Cultivation and production ==
Jute is grown as a Kharif crop, and is sown during the monsoon season and is harvested between the months of July and October. India produces over one million metric tonnes of jute annually and cultivates it on hundreds of thousands of hectares of land. The sector is largely dependent on government procurement, which involves the purchase of jute products worth ₹5,500 crore every year. Most of the jute is consumed domestically due to its strong domestic demand, with an average domestic consumption of 90% of total production.

The principal jute-growing belt lies in the Ganges–Brahmaputra delta, which provides ideal conditions for cultivation of jute. Jute is mainly cultivated in the states of West Bengal, Bihar and Assam. West Bengal alone accounts for about 50% of India's raw jute production. Jute is also cultivated in the states of Odisha, Andhra Pradesh, Tripura and Meghalaya.

As per the Ministry of Agriculture & Farmers' Welfare's Third Advance Estimates for the 2024-25 agricultural year, India's raw jute production is estimated at 83.08 lakh bales (each weighing 180 kg), marking a decline from 92.52 lakh bales in the previous year.

== Varieties ==
Jute in India is obtained from two species of the genus Corchorus. They are Corchorus olitorius (tossa jute) and Corchorus capsularis (white jute).

== Exports ==
India is one of the world’s leading exporters of jute and jute products, including raw fibre, yarn, and diversified goods such as bags, mats, etc. The country exports jute products to many countries, including the United States, the United Kingdom, Germany, Turkey, and countries in the Middle East and Africa.

During 2021-22, the United States was the highest importer of Indian jute, with a value of US$118.3 million, a 26% increase from the previous year.

== Government organizations ==
The National Jute Board is a statutory body under the Ministry of Textiles, Government of India. It is responsible for the development of the jute sector. It undertakes activities related to market development, export promotion, and support for jute cultivation and manufacturing.

The Jute Corporation of India Limited (JCI) is central public sector undertaking under the ownership of Ministry of Textiles, Government of India. It was incorporated in 1971. Its primary role is to procure raw jute at Minimum Support Price (MSP) and to promote improved cultivation technology.

== Diseases ==
Jute crops are affected by diseases such as stem rot, anthracnose, and wilt, caused mainly by fungi. These diseases reduce plant growth, fibre quality, and yield.

== See also ==
- Jute
- Jute cultivation
- Jute industry in Bangladesh
