= Acland Mill =

First jute mill established in India

- Industry: Jute
- Founded: 1855; 171 years ago in Rishra, Bengal Presidency, British India
- Founder: George Acland
- Defunct: 1858
- Fate: Burnt down in 1858

The Acland Mill was the first jute mill established in India. The mill was established in 1855 by British entrepreneur George Acland and Bengali financier Babu Bysumber Sen in Rishra, Bengal Presidency, British India (present-day West Bengal, India).

== Background ==
At the beginning of the nineteenth century, jute manufacturing in India and Bengal was inefficient and of poor quality. The Crimean War interrupted the supply of flax and hemp from the Russian Empire to Britain, which enabled the Bengali jute trade to permanently take the place of the flax and hemp supply. By the middle of the eighteenth century, Bengal exported large quantities of raw jute to supply the flax industry in Dundee.

The founder of the Acland Mill was George Acland, an English entrepreneur, owner of coffee plantations in Ceylon, and former marine in the East India Company's Marine, from Devonshire. He initially had the idea to grow rhea grass to serve as a substitute for flax and hemp, to make up for losses he had acquired through other business ventures. However, John Kerr, a machine manufacturer, advised Acland to manufacture jute products in Bengal instead.

== Mill history ==
In 1855, George Acland, in collaboration with a Bengali financier named Babu Bysumber Sen and a Dundee jute overseer, installed the first jute spinning machinery at Rishra. Acland Mill was then established as the first jute mill in India. The mill was built on land that formed a part of the Garden House property once owned by Warren Hastings.

The Acland Mill was managed by Charles Smith, a jute mill overseer from Dundee. The mill produced 8 tons of jute yarn per day in its first two years of operation, which were in turn sold to local weavers. In about 1857, the mill expanded to handweaving coarse gunny cloth on a small number of frame hand looms.

During the Indian Rebellion of 1857, Acland hired seamen from the Sailors' Home in Calcutta, along with the staff that operated the mill, to guard his property. Around this time, Acland also formed the mill into a limited liability company named Rishra Twine and Yarn Mills Co. Ld.

== Reestablishments and legacy ==
After the mill burnt down in 1858, Acland reestablished the mill in 1862 under the new name of the Ischera Yarn Mill. In 1868, the Ischera Yarn Mill was wound up and auctioned off to new owners. After it was partially closed down from 1868 to 1872, the mill was again restarted under the name of the Calcutta Jute Mills Co., Ld. This mill prospered primarily because of the British demand for cotton caused by the American Civil War, by providing a supply of jute bags to Bombay (present-day Mumbai).

In 1877, the mill was transferred to the A.R. McIntosh and Co., after which it became bankrupt in 1880. It was then purchased by the Champdany Jute Company (James Finlay & Co) in 1880 and later renamed as the Wellington Jute Mills.

The minor success that the Acland Mill enjoyed in the Bengali jute trade prompted the establishment of several other jute mills in Calcutta. One such mill was established in 1859 by the Borneo Company, which enjoyed much success in the late 1860s and early 1870s.

== See also ==
- Adamjee Jute Mills - first jute mill in East Pakistan (present-day Bangladesh)
- Jute trade
