= Adamjee Group =

Conglomerate company in Karachi, Pakistan

- Type: Corporate group
- Founded: 1896
- Founder: Haji Dawood
- Headquarters: Karachi, Pakistan
- Key people: Adamjee Haji Dawood; Abdul Wahid Adamjee
- Website: adamjees.com

Adamjee Group (Urdu pronunciation: [ˈaː.dəm.dʒiː] AH-dum-jee) is a group of companies headquartered in Karachi, Pakistan. The group was previously headed by Sir Adamjee Haji Dawood.

As of 2007, it is unofficially estimated that the owners of Adamjee Group are among the top 40 wealthiest families in Pakistan.

== History ==
Adamjee Group was founded by Haji Dawood in 1896. The family holding company was formally registered as Adamjee Sons, Ltd. in Pakistan. In 1964, Time described Gul Mohamed Adamjee as the jute king of Pakistan. Initially originating as a jute and banking conglomerate, Adamjee later spread to other industries such as tea, textiles, matches, sugar, paper board, chemicals, engineering and insurance.

== Subsidiaries ==
Enterprises under the umbrella of the group are:

- Ad Power
- Panther Trading
- Commodities Trading
- Matual Trading Co.
- Adamjee Pharmaceuticals
- Coastal Enterprises
- Adamjee Diesel Engineering
- Pacific Multi Products
- Adamjee Engineering
- Chempro Pakistan
- Enesel Industries
- Sahara Buying Services
- Adamjee Automotive
- Adamjee Polymers Company
- Adamjee Durabuilt
- Adamjee Corporation

=== Former subsidiaries ===
==== East Pakistan ====
Former enterprises which were based in East Pakistan are:

- Jute
  - Adamjee Jute Mills
  - Jute Fibers Ltd.
  - R. Sim & Co. (operated jute presses)
- Sugar
  - National Sugar Mills
- Textile
  - Orient Textile Mills Ltd.
  - Meghna Textile Mills Ltd.
  - Khulna Textile Mills Ltd.
- Tea
  - National Tea Company Limited (now owned by the Bangladeshi government)
  - Aroma Tea Ltd.
  - Patrakola Tea Company Ltd.
  - Adamjee Tea Gardens Ltd.
- Cement
  - Assam-Bengal Cement Company Ltd.
- Insurance
  - Adamjee Insurance Ltd.
- Other
  - Dhaka Vegetable Oil Mills Ltd.
  - National Tubes Limited
  - Dacca Tobacco Industries Ltd. (nationalised in 1972, later acquired by Akij Group, then sold to Japan Tobacco International)
  - Gammon East Pakistan Ltd. (a civil engineering and construction firm)
  - Premier Laminations Ltd.(a company that produced polyethylene bags)
  - Star Particle Board Mills Ltd. (now owned by Partex Group)
  - Adamjee Sons Ltd. (A holding company which owned the shares of the group's subsidiaries along with properties, tea gardens, and stock in other corporations on behalf of the Adamjee family. It was nationalized by the Government of Bangladesh in 1971 and continues to be run as a state-owned enterprise today.)

==== West Pakistan ====
- Adamjee Insurance, sold to Nishat Group in 2004
- Muslim Commercial Bank (nationalized in 1972 under Zulfikar Ali Bhutto and were compensated by the government)
- Orient Airways (became PIA in 1955)
- Adamjee Industries
- Adamjee Sugar Mills in Mianwali, sold to Fecto Group in 1975
- Adamjee Paper and Board Mills in Nowshera
- DDT Factory in Nowshera, factory closed in 1994

== See also ==
- List of largest companies in Pakistan
