= JF (Bangladesh) Limited =

- Formation: 1896
- Headquarters: Chittagong, Bangladesh
- Region served: Bangladesh
- Official language: Bengali
- Website: jfbd.com

JF (Bangladesh) Limited, previously known as James Finlay Bangladesh, is a prominent shipping and logistics business in Bangladesh. It is a successor firm of James Finlay Limited, a leading Scottish trading company in the British Empire.

== History ==
The company was incorporated in Bengal in 1901. After the end of colonial rule, the British Finlays Group operated the company for 57 years, until 2004, when it was sold to a group of Bangladeshi businessmen under the JF (Bangladesh) Limited name.

It received a gold medal for exports from 2000 to 2001 from Prime Minister Khaleda Zia. It was forced to deposit 2.38 billion BDT into the government exchange during a crackdown on corruption in Bangladesh from the 2006–2008 Bangladeshi political crisis.

They represent 52 global charter vessels company in Bangladesh. It provides seamen to shipping companies around the globe. It works as a consultancy and warehouse services to The New Sylhet Tea Estate Limited, Baraoora (Sylhet) Tea Company Limited, Consolidate Tea & Lands Co. (Bangladesh) Limited, and the Burjan Tea Estate Limited.

The company is headquartered at Finlay House in Agrabad, Chittagong.

== Subsidiaries ==
- Local representative of Protection and indemnity insurance
- Local representative of Lloyd's Agency.
- Liner Agency Representation
- Local agent of InterOil
- Finlay Bazar
- Finlay Travels
