= Bangladesh Jute Mills Association =

Bangladeshi group

- Formation: 1982
- Headquarters: Dhaka, Bangladesh
- Region served: Bangladesh
- Official language: Bengali

The Bangladesh Jute Mills Association (Bengali: বাংলাদেশ পাট মিলস অ্যাসোসিয়েশন) is an association of jute mill owners in Bangladesh. This along with the Bangladesh Jute Spinners Association and Bangladesh Jute Goods Exporters' Association represents the interest of the jute industry in Bangladesh. It was established by Samsul Islam in 1982. Abdul Barik Khan is the secretary of the association.

== History ==
Jute is a major industry in Bangladesh and in 1947-1948 made up 80 percent of the exports from East Bengal. In 1969-1970 period, jute was responsible for 46 percent of foreign exchange earning by Pakistan. After the Independence of Bangladesh, the government nationalized major jute mills under the Bangladesh Jute Mills Corporation. By 1975–1976, jute exports had declined to make up only 25 percent of the export from Bangladesh. Bangladesh Jute Mills Association was founded in 1982 as the government started to denationalise jute mills and returning them to private ownership.

The Bangladesh Jute Mills Association is composed of 35 jute mills. From 1997 to 1998, jute mills in Bangladesh produced 100 thousand metric ton of jute. By 2013, member ship had expanded to include 88 jute mills. The membership expanded as the government of Bangladesh privatised a significant number of state owned jute mills.

In the 2003 annual general meeting of the Bangladesh Jute Mills Association, Mirza Ali Behrouze Ispahani was elected chairman of the association. The association has been lobbying the government of Bangladesh to provide a stimulus package. India had placed anti dumping tariff on jute products from Bangladesh.
