= BJMC =

BJMC may refer to:

- B. J. Medical College, medical college in Pune, India
- B.J. Medical College, Ahmedabad, medical college in Ahmedabad, India
- Bangladesh Jute Mills corporation, a public corporation that owns and manages all government jute mills in Bangladesh
- Team BJMC, sporting club in Bangladesh
