= Adamjee Haji Dawood =

Pakistani businessman (1880–1948)

Sir Adamjee Haji Dawood
- آدم جی حاجی داؤد
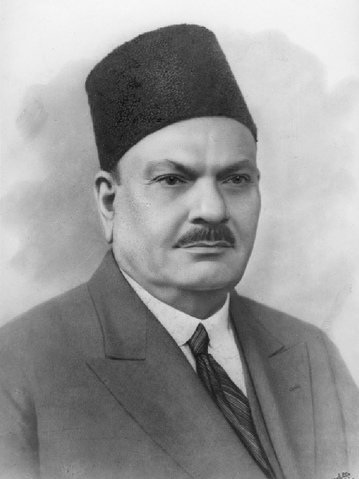
- Born: 30 June 1880; Jetpur, Bombay Presidency, British India
- Died: 27 January 1948 (aged 67); Karachi, Dominion of Pakistan
- Occupation: Businessman
- Spouse: Maryam Bai (m. 1898)
- Children: Abdul Wahid Adamjee (son); Zakaria Adamjee (son); Gul Muhammad Adamjee (son)

Sir Adamjee Haji Dawood Bawany (30 June 1880 – 27 January 1948) was a Pakistani businessman and philanthropist who founded Adamjee Group. He was also an activist in the Pakistan Movement.

== Early life ==
Adamjee Haji Dawood was born in 1880 in Jetpur, Bombay Presidency in British India into a Memon family. While still in his teens, he ventured out to Burma and started operating as an independent businessman. The first few years of his career were spent in the rice, safety matches in wooden boxes, and jute trade.

By 1922, he had accumulated sufficient resources and a strong presence in the commodities markets, enabling him to set up his first industrial venture – a match factory in Rangoon. In 1927, he returned to establish a jute mill in Calcutta. The Adamjee Jute Mills Limited was the third jute mill to be set up by an Indian and the first Muslim-owned public company in British India. To capture this emerging niche, Adamjee along with Mr. G. D. Birla of Birla Jute, broke into this monopolistic trade controlled by the East India Company until that time.

He was also an avid educationist and philanthropist. He was responsible for financing and helping a number of educational institutions in present-day India and Pakistan.

== Career ==
By the 1940s, Dawood had become a prominent figure in the business circles of India and Burma. His recognition was acknowledged by Muhammad Ali Jinnah, who became a good friend and appointed him advisor to the freedom movement of the Muslims, which eventually led to the creation of Pakistan. Dawood convinced the entire Memon and many from other Gujarati Muslim communities to migrate to Pakistan. With this vision in mind again at the request of Jinnah, he also established two major institutions along with Mirza Ahmad Ispahani i.e. The Muslim Commercial Bank Limited and the Orient Airways Limited, forerunner of Pakistan International Airlines. The purpose of this was to assist the migration process by providing transport of Muslims to Pakistan and to create banking facilities in the new country, Pakistan.

== Death and legacy ==
Once Pakistan was created, Dawood and his sons established businesses in both East Pakistan (now Bangladesh) and West Pakistan. Following financial difficulties in Pakistan in January 1948, Jinnah invited him to participate in the establishment of the State Bank of Pakistan, it was during this meeting that he suffered a heart attack and later died on the night of 27 January 1948. The founder of Pakistan, Muhammad Ali Jinnah stated on his death that his death would leave a vacuum in Muslim business community which would be hard to fill. Jinnah called it a "National Loss" to Pakistan and said that Adamjee Haji Dawood was a loyal Muslim and had rendered great service in our struggle for Pakistan.

On 27 August 1947, Mohammad Ali Jinnah's finance team approached Adamjee Dawood for help because India had not released the share of funds due to Pakistan. So the newly created country Pakistan was in financial trouble. Adamjee Haji Dawood wrote a 'blank cheque' secured against all his industrial assets and personal wealth which enabled the country to handle its financial crisis successfully.

== Awards and recognition ==
- In recognition for his services to his countrymen, the British government knighted him in June 1938.
- The Government of Pakistan honoured Sir Adamjee Haji Dawood by minting a postage stamp titled 'Pioneers of Freedom' on 14 August 1999.
- Adamjee Government Science College is named after his family.
