= Jute mill =

Factory for processing jute

A jute mill is a factory for processing jute. There is evidence of jute fibre extraction dating back to the Han dynasty, with a fragment of jute paper being discovered in Dunhuang, in the Gansu Province. The first known mechanical jute mills are believed to have been converted flax mills, the oldest possibly being establish in Dundee, after a contract was agreed with the East India Company, for the supply of jute as a substitute for then scarce flax, in 1820. By the mid-1800s jute mills were being established in British India, George Acland's Mill of 1855, at Rishra, being the oldest. The world's largest jute mill was the Adamjee Jute Mills at Narayanganj in Bangladesh, which closed all operations in 2002.

== In popular culture ==
Jack London worked in a jute mill before becoming a successful writer.

In the 1931 Howard Hawks film The Criminal Code, the main character Robert Graham spends six years working in a jute mill in prison.

In the 1939 Charles Vidor film Those High Grey Walls, a prisoner is assigned to work in the prison jute mill.

In the 1984 film Paar, the lead character and his wife work in a jute mill.

== See also ==
- Textile manufacturing
