= Beparis =

Jute traders in West Bengal, India and Bangladesh

Beparis are a group of traders or intermediaries in the raw jute trade, that stock and supply raw jute to jute mills in West Bengal, India and Bangladesh. The jute mills generally don't buy raw jute from the farmers. For the supply of raw jute, the jute mills rely on the Beparis who directly buy raw jute from the farmers.
