= Abdul Wahid Adamjee =

Pakistani industrialist

- Born: 1908; Rangoon, Burma Province, British India
- Died: 4 July 1972 (aged 63–64); Karachi, Pakistan
- Occupation: Businessman
- Years active: 1925–1972

Abdul Wahid Adamjee (1908 – 4 July 1972) was a Pakistani industrialist.

== Early life ==
Adamjee was born in 1908, in Rangoon, Burma Province, British India. He completed his education in Burma. He was the eldest son of Adamjee Haji Dawood, the founder of Adamjee Group.

== Career ==
Adamjee joined the Adamjee Group in 1925. He worked in the match factory and rice mill of the group in Burma. From 1938 to 1948, he expanded the group in British India. He succeeded his father as the head of the Adamjee Group and Adamjee family, after his death on 27 January 1948. He expanded the Adamjee Group and played an important role in the industrialization of Pakistan. He founded the Adamjee Jute Mills in Dacca, East Pakistan which was the largest jute mill in the world. He established Adamjee Tea Gardens in East Pakistan, then the largest tea fields in the world. In 1958, he was awarded the Hilal-e-Pakistan by the Government of Pakistan. He served as the chairman of Pakistan Industrial Credit and Investment Corporation. The Adamjee group was estimated to be worth more than 60 million dollar in 1971, more than half of which was lost when Bangladesh became an independent country.

== Death ==
Adamjee died on 4 July 1972, aged 64, in Karachi, Pakistan.
