= Jute cultivation =

Process of growing the jute plant

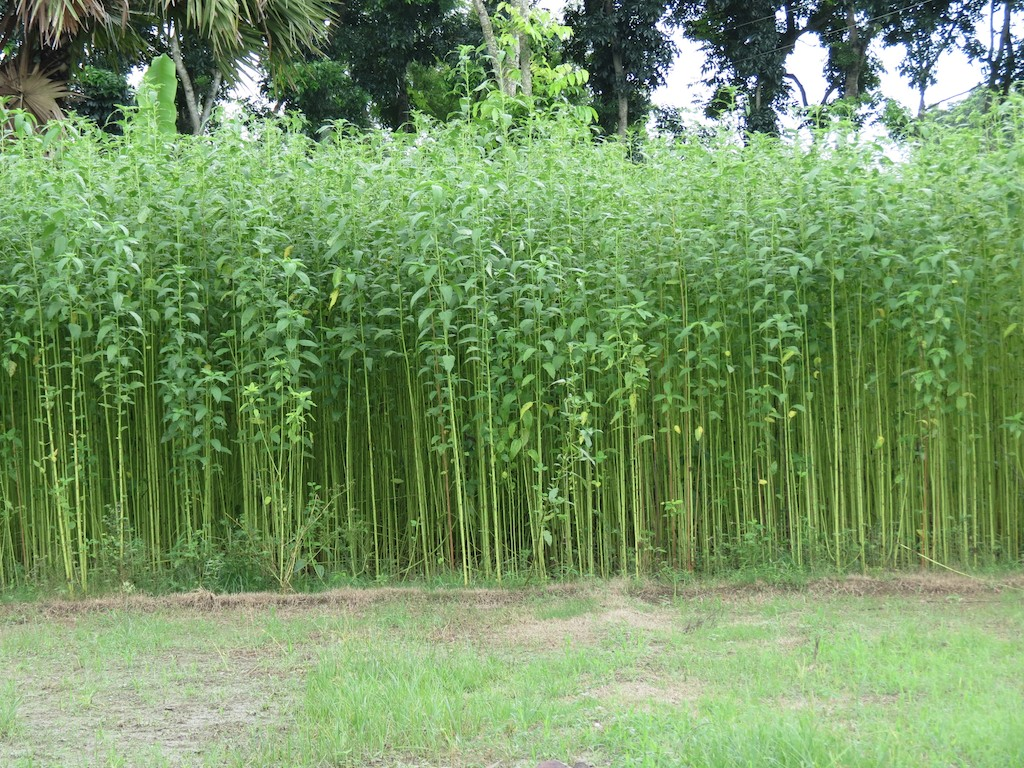
Jute field in Bangladesh.

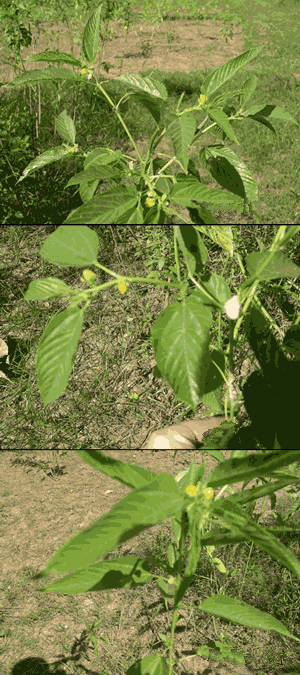
Jute plants (Corchorus olitorius).

Jute is one of the most important natural fibers after cotton in terms of cultivation and usage. Cultivation is dependent on the climate, season, and soil.

Almost 85% of the world's jute cultivation is concentrated in the Ganges Delta. This fertile geographic region is shared by India (mainly West Bengal) and Bangladesh. China also has a dominant place in jute cultivation. On a smaller scale, Thailand, Myanmar (Burma), Pakistan, Nepal, and Bhutan also cultivate jute.

== Cultivation ==
To grow jute, farmers first scatter the seeds on cultivated soil. When the plants are about 15–20 cm tall, they are thinned out. About four months after planting, harvesting begins. The plants are usually harvested after they flower and before the flowers go to seed. The stalks are cut off close to the ground, tied into bundles and soaked in water for about 20 days. This process softens the tissues and breaks the hard pectin bond between the bast and hurd (inner woody fibers) and permits the fibers to be separated. The fibers are then stripped from the stalks in long strands and washed in clear, running water. Then they are hung up or spread on thatched roofs to dry. After 2–3 days of drying, the fibers are tied into bundles. The suitable climate for growing jute is a warm and wet climate, which is offered by the monsoon climate during the fall season, immediately followed by summer. Temperatures ranging to more than 25 °C and relative humidity of 70%–90% are favorable for successful cultivation. Jute requires 160–200 cm of rainfall yearly with extra needed during the sowing period. River basins, alluvial or loamy soils with a pH range between 4.8 and 5.8 are best for jute cultivation. Jute cultivation in red soils may require high dosage of manure. Plain land or gentle slope or low land is ideal for jute cultivation. Since the jute seeds are small in size, land should be finely tilled, which can be done by careful ploughing.

== Retting ==
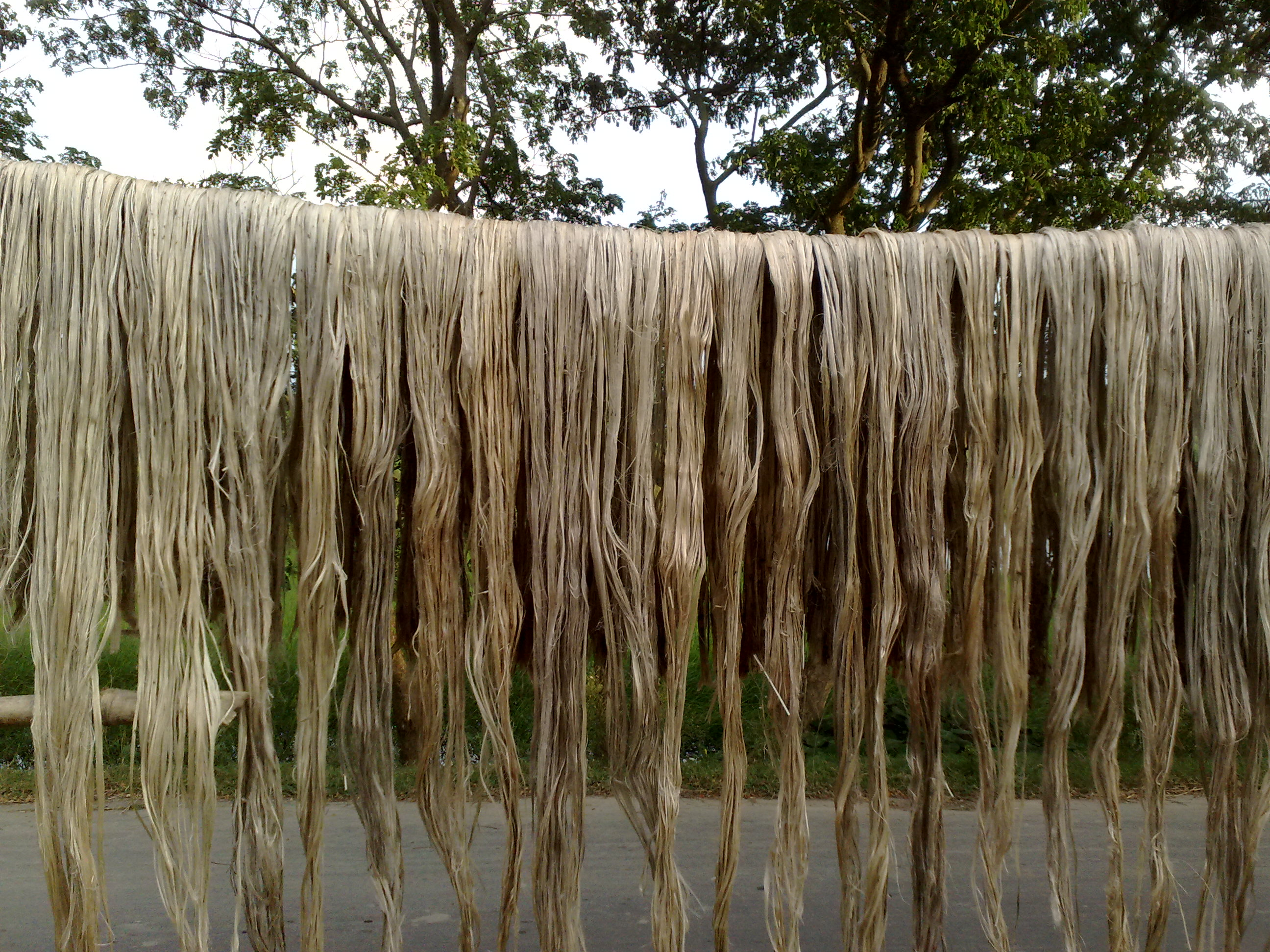
Jute fiber being dried in sunlight after natural or microbial retting

Retting is the process of extracting fibers from the tough stem or bast of the bast fiber plants. The available retting processes are: mechanical retting (hammering), chemical retting (boiling & applying chemicals), steam/vapor/dew retting, and water or microbial retting. Among them, water or microbial retting is a centuries-old, widely popular process of extracting fine bast fibers. However, choice of retting process depends on the availability of water and cost.

The stalks stay submerged in water for 20 days. However, the retting process may require less time if the quality of the jute is better. In most cases, the fiber extraction process of bast fibers in water retting is done by farmers while standing under water.

When the jute stalk is well retted, the stalks are grabbed in bundles and hit with a long wooden hammer to loosen the fibers from the jute hurd or core. After loosening the fibers, the fibers are washed with water and squeezed dry. The extracted fibers are further washed with water and allowed to dry on bamboo poles. Finally, they are tied into small bundles to be sold into the primary market.

== Major producers ==
The Ganges delta contributes more than 80% of the jute production in the world. The Ganges delta can be sub-divided into the following geo-graphical regions in terms of jute cultivation:

- Jat area (Brahmaputra Alluvium): This comprises the districts of Dhaka, Mymensingh, and Comilla of Bangladesh. The area annually receives fresh deposit of silts carried down by the flood water. Soils are acidic, the texture varies from sand loam to clay loam. According to commercial quality, the best quality jute, the Jat type, grows in this area.
- District area (Ganges Alluvium): This comprises part of the districts of Kushtia, Jessore, Khulna, Rajshahi, Pabna, and Dhaka of Bangladesh and major portion of West Bengal of India. This area has soil of slight alkaline clay loam to light loam in gray to dark gray color. The type of jute grown in this area is known as District Jute, which is next to Jat Jute in order of quality. The jute fibre grown in this region is further divided into two major varieties, such as: Hard District Jute and Soft District Jute.
- Northern area (Teesta Silt): This comprises part of Dinajpur, Rangpur Lalmonirhat, Gaibandha, Kurigram, Nilphamari and Panchagarh districts, East Bogra, and Sirajganj of Bangladesh and some parts of North Bihar Purnea and West Bengal of India. The region has sandy soil with low moisture retention capacity. Soil retention is slightly acidic.

=== Strengths of major jute producing countries ===
India is the world's biggest producer of jute, followed by Bangladesh. Jute is primarily grown in West Bengal, Odisha, Assam, Meghalaya, Tripura and Andhra Pradesh.

- India is the largest producer or cultivator of jute in the world. Its 1987 law mandating the use of jute for certain packaging is one reason it is also the largest consumer of jute in the world.
- Bangladesh is currently the second largest producer of jute fiber, now overtaken by India. The Jat Area, popular for producing high quality jute fiber, is located in Bangladesh. Therefore, Bangladesh is able to supply the highest quality of jute fiber in the world. However, Bangladesh falls behind its other competitors in applying recent technological advancements. In terms of world export of jute fiber, Bangladesh's share is more than 70%, which makes Bangladesh the largest exporter of jute fiber in the world.

== History ==
In classical antiquity, Pliny recorded that jute plants were used as food in Ancient Egypt.

For centuries, jute has been an integral part of the culture of East Bengal and some parts of West Bengal, precisely in the southwest of Bangladesh. Since the seventeenth century, the British started trading in jute. During the reign of the British Empire jute was also used in the military. British jute barons grew rich processing jute and selling manufactured products made from jute. Dundee Jute Barons and the British East India Company set up many jute mills in Bengal and by 1895 jute industries in Bengal overtook the Scottish jute trade. Many Scots emigrated to Bengal to set up jute factories. More than a billion jute sandbags were exported from Bengal to the trenches during World War I and also exported to the southern United States region to bag cotton. It was used in the fishing, construction, art and the arms industry. Initially, due to its texture, it could only be processed by hand until it was discovered in Dundee that by treating it with whale oil, it could be treated by machine.

Jute was produced in Taiwan from the 1700s to the 1960s, when the use of plastic became common. During Japanese rule, production increased until World War II, and was centered south of Fengyuan, Taichung, and north of Yunlin County.
