= Platinum Jubilee Jute Mills =

Government-owned mill in Khulna, Bangladesh

- Formation: 1954
- Headquarters: Dhaka, Bangladesh
- Region served: Bangladesh
- Official language: Bengali
- Website: bjmc.gov.bd/site/page/fa641c29-67d9-443c-8a7d-50f42abd66ec/Platinum-Jubilee-Jute-Mills-Limited

Platinum Jubilee Jute Mills (Bengali:প্লাটিনাম জুবিলী জুট মিলস্) is a Bangladesh government owned jute mill in Khulna. It is owned by Bangladesh Jute Mills Corporation. It is one of the oldest and largest jute mill of Bangladesh.

== History ==
Platinum Jubilee Jute Mills was established in 1954 in Khalishpur Thana, Khulna.

During the Bangladesh Liberation War in 1971, 56 workers were burned alive by Pakistan Army in the boiler room of the mill. A number of non-Bengali workers were killed by Bengalis during the war. After the Independence of Bangladesh, Platinum Jubilee Jute Mills, along with other Pakistan owned Jute Mills, were nationalized and placed under Bangladesh Jute Mills Corporation, a state owned company.

Platinum Jubilee Jute Mills terminated workers of the Carpet Baking Cloth unit in September 2007. Jute Mills Workers' Development Committee carried out marches with coffins. Fire service used water cannons to prevent workers from self-immolating during protests. It continued to use firewood in 2011 despite a government ban. It supplied raw materials to Daulatpur Jute Mills.

Since 2013, Platinum Jubilee Jute Mills stopped payments to the provident fund and gratuity. The mill fails to pay workers on time increasing difficulty for current and former workers. Bangladesh Jute Mills Corporation signed an agreement with China Textile Industrial Corporation to morderize Platinum Jubilee in 2016. The mill struggled with funds in 2018.

Platinum Jubilee Jute Mills struggled with production in 2019 due to shortage of raw materials. One worker died in a fast unto death protest despite requests by Begum Monnujan Sufian, State minister for labour and employment, to end the protests. In 2020, the government closed Platinum Jubilee Jute Mills, along with 24 other jute mills, terminating the workers and evicted them from staff quarters. The closure was approved by Prime Minister Sheikh Hasina. At the time of closure the mill was operating at 10 percent capacity. A worker died of a heart attack after seeing the termination letter on Facebook. Workers protested against the closure and demanding unpaid wages. Two worker leaders were pickup by unidentified men and found 20 hours later in police custody. Paat-Shuta O Bostro Kol Sramik Karmachari Sangram Parishad, a worker's platform, called for the reopening of the mill and mordernization.

The mill was leased to Akij Group which failed to restore normal operations.

In 2024, Bangladesh Jute Mills Corporation invited international bids for leasing Platinum Jubilee Jute Mills and five other mills.
