= International Jute Study Group =

Research institute in Bangladesh

- Formation: 2002; 24 years ago
- Headquarters: Dhaka, Bangladesh
- Region served: Bangladesh
- Official language: English
- Website: International Jute Study Group

The International Jute Study Group (IJSG) is an intergovernmental organization of states that functions as the international commodity board for jute, kenaf, and related fibres. The IJSG functions as a body of the United Nations Conference on Trade and Development. Its main purpose is to ensure transparency in the international trade of jute and kenaf.

The creation of the IJSG was negotiated in 2000 and 2001 in Geneva and was agreed to in a multilateral treaty known as the Agreement establishing the Terms of Reference of the International Jute Study Group. The IJSG was intended to replace the International Jute Organization, which had ceased to exist. The agreement was ratified by Bangladesh, the European Union, India, and Switzerland, and the IJSG came into existence on 27 April 2002, with headquarters in Dhaka, Bangladesh.

Switzerland withdrew from IJSG in September 2002. The states that remain in the IJSG account for approximately 60 per cent of the world's jute trade.
