= James Finlay & Co =

UK business

James Finlay & Co was formed in 1750 and under the leadership of Kirkman Finlay became one of Scotland's leading cotton manufacturers and merchants. In the 1860s the firm came under the control of John Muir and diversified into Indian tea plantations. The cotton business was eventually closed and, after an unsuccessful period of diversification, Finlay concentrated on its core interests of tea and other agricultural produce. In 2000, the firm was acquired by John Swire & Son.

== Early history ==
James Finlay was born in Killearn Stirlingshire in 1727. He started work in the textile trade until he had enough money to become a merchant and manufacturer. In 1769 he was made a "Burgess and Gild Brother" in Glasgow enabling him to build up a modest business. When James died in 1790, the assets of the firm were £11, 785. It was James's younger son, Kirkman Finlay, that took the firm into manufacturing and made it a major force in the Scottish cotton industry.

Kirkman was born in 1773 and took over the firm at the age of 17 on the death of his father. It was he who was responsible for the early growth of James Finlay & Co. broadening the merchanting and turning the firm into one of the leading Scottish cotton manufacturers. The increase in Finlay's trade required more capital and in 1792 Kirkman widened the basis of the firm by what Brogan described as entering into partnership with the Glasgow merchants Leitch and Smith, and Stirling, Gordon, These two firms were among the larger Glasgow West India merchants, and Devine noted that Leitch and Smith and Stirling, Gordon & Co held about fifty per cent of the capital stock of James Finlay & Co. These new relationships helped Finlay expand its export of cotton manufactures to Europe.

Having expanded the firm's traditional merchanting, Kirkman moved into manufacturing by purchasing three large cotton mills: Ballindalloch in 1798, Catrine in 1801 and Deanston in 1806 becoming "probably the single largest producer of cottons in Scotland".

The firm established branches overseas, initially in Europe, but later further afield. These branches were often in the form of partnerships between Finlay and local management and included Manchester, 1799; Heligoland, 1807; and London and Malta in 1809. Also acquired was Easton, Alston & Co. in 1805 which exported cotton and other goods to The Bahamas. This connection led to the establishment of branches in the United States at New York, New Orleans and Charleston. Raw cotton was imported to Glasgow and finished cotton goods exported.

Kirkman campaigned actively against the monopoly of the East India Company and in 1813 legislation ended the company's monopoly of the India trade. In 1816, James Finlay & Co. sent out a shipment of goods and was the first merchant house in Scotland to open up direct connection with India, opening up a branch in Bombay. By the time of Kirkman's death in 1842, James Finlay & Co. was a leading Scottish manufacturer, trading with America, and across Europe and Asia. A measure of his rise to prominence were his public offices. As early as 1813 he was elected Lord Provost of Glasgow; he also became a Governor of the Forth and Clyde Navigation, President of the Chamber of Commerce and a Member of Parliament.

== Decline ==
Kirkman Finlay had long been the dominant personality in the company and there seemed no natural succession. After his death in 1842, the firm was reconstituted with the four sons of Kirkman and two Buchanan distant cousins. The partners agreed to continue the business with a view to liquidation but that strategy was never fully implemented. However, in 1843, the connection with the London branch was terminated and in 1844 the three cotton mills were advertised for sale. Only Ballindalloch found a buyer and the Company kept the other two. Losses were incurred in 1847 and 1848; by then John Finlay was the only son of Kirkman left in the firm, and non-family members had been brought in as partners. The first change in its fortunes came from one of the newer partners, James Clark, appointed in 1847, who proposed that he also become a partner in Wilson, James & Kay and a new company should manage their joint sales. Considerable sums had to be spent modernizing the Catrine and Deanston mills and the Indian agency business was revived. In 1858 the Company formally merged with Wilson, James & Kay under the James Finlay name. James Clark held 30% of the shares with Messrs. Williams and Kay holding a further 45%. The remaining Finlay family director (John) and his cousin Archibald Buchanan held the final 25%: the Finlay family no longer controlled the company.

== Sir John Muir ==
One of the new partners appointed in 1861 was John Muir. That was the year the American Civil War started; supplies of cotton were curtailed and the cotton mills were closed. John Muir turned to India to source the firm's cotton and opened offices in Calcutta and Bombay. Muir gradually built up his capital in the firm and by 1871 he owned 8 of the 30 shares. John Finlay died in 1873 and when Archibald Buchanan retired in 1883, Muir became the sole owner of James Finlay & Co. The Calcutta branch was formed as Finlay Muir and first acted as agency business for cotton and other goods. Muir then diversified into the manufacture of jute, forming the Champdany Jute Company in 1873. A second mill was added in 1880 with the purchase of the Acland Mill, later renamed as the Wellington Jute Mills. The two spinning mills employed 5,000 workers.

In 1882 the firm's Scottish cotton mills were declared unremunerative and John Muir and the junior partners agreed to invest "a considerable amount of capital" in two tea companies. According to Brogan. he diverted most of the firm's resources to this entirely new venture. "The general business of merchant and agent was well understood by the firm, but the development and management of tea estates was something entirely new." John Finlay & Co was to act for the tea companies in Glasgow and the joint partnership of Finlay Muir & Co, in Calcutta as agents in India.

Finlay's operations were extensive. The firm cleared forests, built roads, planted estates and employed thousands of workers. Muir also made advances to estates in order to secure agency appointments. This eventually led to the creation of what became known as the Finlay Group of companies. The four companies were: Consolidated Tea & Lands Co Ltd; Amalgamated Tea Estates Co Ltd; Kanan Devan Hills Produce Co Ltd; and Anglo-American Direct Tea Trading Co Ltd. Consolidated Tea had been formed in 1896 from the merger of North and South Sylhet Tea companies. Amalgamated Tea was formed in 1896 to consolidate various estates. Kanan Devan was formed in 1897 to hold a tract of land in North Travancore. Anglo American Direct Tea Trading formed in 1898; in addition to the acreage it acquired it formed large distribution businesses.

Like Kirkman Finlay before him, Sir John Muir's commercial achievements brought public recognition. He too became a Lord Provost and was created a Baronet in 1892. By the time of his death in 1903, Finlay had 274,000 acres planted and employed 70,000 Indian workers and a large staff of superintendents, managers and assistants from Scotland. It was the leading Indian tea supplier in the UK market.

== Corporate ownership ==
Sir John Muir had four sons and six daughters. Upon his death in 1903, the business was supervised by trustees and the management was led by the eldest son, Alexander Kay Muir. In 1909 a private limited company was formed to consolidate the various interests of James Finlay. These included the Glasgow merchanting business and the Catrine and Deanston Mills, the interests of the firm in the Liverpool and London merchanting businesses, and all the interests of Finlay Muir in the Indian sub-continent.

The fall in commodity prices and the devaluation of the Indian rupee after WWI caused severe losses for Finlay; amongst other things, Champdany Jute was placed in liquidation. However, after a recovery in profits, the firm was floated on the Stock Exchange in 1924. The following year, Finlay acquired land in Kenya and formed The African Highlands Produce Co., now James Finlay (Kenya); Finlay planted estates and Kenya became an important producer of tea and flowers. In general, the inter-war period was difficult for Finlay, with the depression, falling commodity prices and Indian cotton manufacture suffering from Japanese imports, The Scottish mills also incurred losses but were kept open.

== Rationalization and new ownership ==
Following WWII a new mill was built at Catrine and Deanston reconstructed but it was not sufficient to keep them viable and the mills were closed in the mid-1960s. The Indian jute and cotton mills had been sold after Indian independence so with the closure of the Scottish Mills, James Finlay's main activities were tea plantations and merchant banking. From there, a gradual diversification began taking the Company into North Sea oil, manufacturing and the USA.

A further catalyst for change came with the purchase of a near 30% shareholding in the company by Slater Walker; when it ran into financial difficulties, the shareholding was sold in October 1976 to John Swire & Sons. That year saw the rationalization of the associated tea companies in India into one unit and these were subsequently sold to Tata Sons in 1977 in return for a 20% holding in Tata Finlay. After the rationalization, the UK interests comprised merchant banking; North Sea oil; tea trading; confectionary and beverages. Overseas, the interests were in financial services, especially Australia; merchanting; and plantations, including Kenya, Bangladesh, and India. Plantations accounted for over half the profits. By the end of the 1970s, Finlay was seeking to reduce its dependence on tea and increase its tropical agriculture base. Finlay also increased its investment in US oil and in merchanting. However, the diversification was not successful and both oil and banking experienced intermittent losses. In 1995, a policy decision was made to dispose of the non-core businesses, leaving plantations, specialty teas, tea trading and beverages. In September 2000, James Finlay was fully acquired by John Swire and in that decade its core interests were tea; agricultural products including rubber, flowers and timber; and logistics and agency services.
