= Fecto Group =

Corporate group based in Lahore

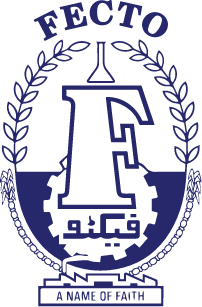
- Type: Corporate group
- Founded: 1952; 74 years ago
- Founder: Ghulam Muhammad A. Fecto
- Products: Cement and tractors
- Website: fectogroup.com

The Fecto Group (Urdu pronunciation: [ˈfɛk.to] FEK-toh) is a group of companies based in Pakistan.

== History ==
Fecto Group was founded by Ghulam Muhammad A. Fecto. After the partition of India in 1947 he migrated to Dhaka and started a trading business dealing in electrical goods and home appliances in 1952.

It then moved to western Pakistan where it transitioned into manufacturing, securing the agency of sugar in 1975.

In 1981 Fecto Cement Limited was established and production commenced in 1990. It is considered a small player in the domestic market holding a 1.3% market share.

== Associated companies ==
=== Listed ===
==== Fecto Cement ====
Originally established in 1981, Fecto Cement officially began production in 1990 operating as a public limited company. Regarded as a small producer locally its plant is located in Sangjani, Islamabad.

In 1982, the ICT Industries and Labour directorate granted Fecto Cement a 30-year lease to operate within Margalla Hills National Park, an area which was officially designated as protected in 1980. In 2011, as the original lease was approaching its expiration in 2012, ICT officials extended Fecto Cement's lease by an additional 18 years. The following year, the Capital Development Authority (CDA) provided consent for Fecto Cement's operations. However, in July 2013, the CDA withdrew its no-objection certificate. In 2016 Fecto Cement's lease was cancelled and a challan of Pkr 420 million had been prepared against the company for operating illegally in the Margalla Hills.

=== Unlisted ===
- Fecto Belarus

== Former associated companies ==
=== Baba Farid Sugar Mills ===
Baba Farid Sugar Mills Limited was incorporated in Sindh in 1978 as a public limited company. In 2010, after years of not being able to produce positive operating results, it was acquired by Patoki Sugar Mills.

=== Fecto Sugar Mills ===
Fecto Sugar Mills Limited was incorporated in 1975 in Darya Khan, Bhakkar District. It also operated a particle-board unit. It was listed on the Karachi Stock Exchange until 2011. It was subsequently acquired by the Imporient Group and renamed Darya Khan Sugar Mills Limited.
