= Janata Jute Mills Limited =

- Formation: 1967
- Headquarters: Ghorashal, Palash Upazila, Narsingdi District
- Region served: Bangladesh
- Official language: Bengali
- Website: janata-sadat-jute.com

Janata Jute Mills Limited is a Bangladesh jute mill in Ghorashal, Palash Upazila, Narsingdi District. It is owned by Akij Group and together with its sister mill, Sadat Jute Industries Limited, is the largest jute manufacturer and exporter in Bangladesh.

== History ==
Janata Jute Mills Limited was established in 1967 and first mill started production in 1969. The second mill, Sadat Jute Industries Limited, was established in 1985 in Debidwar Upazila, Comilla.

Janata Jute Mills Limited announced plans to expand production to jute shopping bags in 2014. It was exporting jute sacks in Thailand and after failing to meet demand from its own factory had outsourced sacks from two other mills.

In June 2020, Sk Bashir Uddin, managing director of Akij Group purchased Janata Jute Mills and Sadat Jute Industries for seven billion Bangladeshi Taka. The mills exports to 125 countries products worth US$55 million in 2019. Then deputy managing director Mahmudul Huq stated the reason for selling the mill was the managing director Najmul Huq could not give time to the mill due to his age and his daughters had settled in the United States.

In MArch 2022, the Mill signed a research agreement with Biochemistry & Molecular Biology Department of the University of Dhaka. It received funding from Infrastructure Development Company Limited to place solar panels on the rooftop of the mill. It received the silver export trophy in 2023 and again in 2024.

On 7 September 2024, Janata Jute Mills Limited was closed by AkijBashir Group, the holding company, after workers attacked, looted, and vandalized administration and security building of the mill.
