= Adamjee Jute Mills =

Bangladeshi jute mill

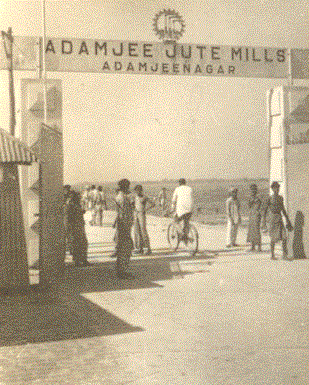
- Adamjee Jute Mills entrance (1950)
- Type: Public
- Industry: Jute
- Founded: 1950
- Founder: Abdul Wahid Adamjee
- Defunct: 2002
- Fate: Nationalised in 1972; Dissolved in 2002
- Headquarters: Narayanganj, Bangladesh
- Key people: A.W. Adamjee; Gul Mohammad Adamjee; Zakaria Adamjee
- Products: Jute related products
- Owner: Adamjee Group of Companies (1950–1971); Bangladesh Jute Mills Corporation (1972–2002)
- Number of employees: 25,000

Adamjee Jute Mills was a jute mill in Bangladesh. It was established in Narayanganj in 1950 by the Adamjee Group. It was the second jute mill in East Pakistan (present-day Bangladesh) after Bawa Jute Mill, which was the first Jute Mill in East Pakistan. Gradually, the mill became the largest jute mill in the world, exceeding the jute mills of Calcutta (now Kolkata), India, and Dundee, Scotland. The mills were nationalised after the independence of Bangladesh in 1972. It was operated by the Bangladesh Jute Mills Corporation before being closed down in 2002.

== History ==
Adamjee Jute Mills was set up by Abdul Wahid Adamjee, Pakistan's foremost industrialist, and scion of the wealthiest family in the country. Initially, the said project was a partnership between the Adamjees and Pakistan Industrial Credit and Investment Corporation (PICIC), the government's industrial arm). The Adamjee family, however, soon took control of the project, and eventually built it into the largest jute mill in the world. In 1947, when India was partitioned, there were 108 jute mills in Bengal but all were located in West Bengal which went to India. After the Independence of Pakistan, Muslim entrepreneurs were asked by the government of Pakistan to create proposals for a jute mill in East Bengal. In December 1949, the Adamjee Group presented to the government of Pakistan a proposal for the jute plant. The capital for the mills were to be provided by Adamjee Brothers and the Pakistan Industrial Development Corporation 50-50 equally. Siddhirganj was chosen as the site of mill due to the good river, road, and rail communication facilities.

The first of three 1000-loom mills started production on 19 December 1951, the second in December 1952. In May 1954, violence clashes took place between Bengali and Bihari workers at the jute mills. The Police and East Pakistan Rifles were deployed to control the situation. In the clashes, 90 were killed and 250 injured. The third mill went into production in March 1956. In 1964, the firm added 128 broad looms to produce wide hessian cloth for which there was strong demand in the United States as backing cloth for tufted carpets.

The Adamjee family lost control of the mill in 1971 during the Bangladesh Liberation War and it was nationalized after the Independence of Bangladesh. During the war, Bengali workers were replaced by Bihari workers in the. After the war ended, the Bihari workers in the factory were protected by the Indian Army. It employed over 25,000 workers when it was closed on 30 June 2002. Since the nationalization, the mill had accumulated 12 billion taka in losses.

== Present ==
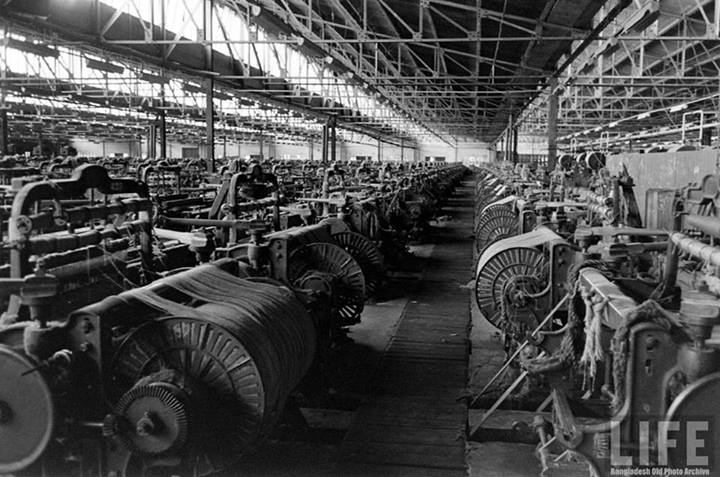
Machinery inside Admajee Jute Mills

After a strong battle for survival, Adamjee Jute Mills was officially closed down in 2002 despite huge protests from local policy makers and political opponents. In that place, a new industrial zone has been installed, Adamjee Export Processing Zone. In August 2011, the jute and textiles ministry sent a proposal to the prime minister of Bangladesh seeking her approval for rebuilding the second unit of the Adamjee Jute Mills in Narayanganj on 11 acres of land at an estimated cost of Tk 6087.2 million.
