= Bangladesh Jute Mills Corporation =

Public corporation which manages jute factories in Bangladesh

- Abbreviation: BJMC
- Formation: 1972; 54 years ago
- Founder: Ministry of Textiles and Jute
- Type: State owned association
- Legal status: Operational
- Purpose: Functioning as an umbrella of all jute factories in Bangladesh
- Headquarters: Adamjee Court Annex-1, 115–120 Motijheel, Dhaka, Bangladesh
- Region served: Bangladesh
- Official language: Bengali, English
- Chairman: Md. Kabir Uddin Sikder, NDC, PSC
- Parent organization: Directorate General of Jute
- Affiliations: Bangladesh Jute Research Institute; Bangladesh Agricultural University; BUTEX; NITER; Bangladesh Football Federation
- Website: www.bjmc.gov.bd

Bangladesh Jute Mills Corporation (BJMC, Bengali: বাংলাদেশ পাটকল করপোরেশন) is a public corporation that manages all government-owned jute factories and industries in Bangladesh. The corporation is located in Dhaka, the capital city of Bangladesh. In addition to the jute mills, it also owns several public entities for the purposes of funding and revenue collection.

== History ==
The BJMC corporation was formed in 1972 when the government of Bangladesh nationalised all the jute mills in the country as part of an effort to institute new socialist policies. Headquartered at Motijheel, Dhaka, the corporation is currently responsible for managing nine state-run jute mills in Bangladesh, including Adamjee Jute Mills. In 2016, the government announced plans to upgrade the jute mills by spending US$340 million with Chinese assistance.

The corporation also has a professional football team called Team BJMC.

== List of nationalised jute mills ==
About 78 jute mills were nationalised following the independence of Bangladesh. Later they became subsidiaries of the Bangladesh Jute Mills Corporation. The list is given below:

- Adamjee Jute Mills
- Afil Jute Mills
- Ajax Jute Mills
- A. K. Khan Jute Mills
- Aleem Jute Mills
- Alhaj Jute Mills
- Alijan Jute Mills
- Allied Jute Mills
- Amin Jute Mills
- Anowara Jute Mills
- A. R. Howlader Jute Mills
- Ashraf Jute Mills
- Bawa Jute Mills
- Broad Burlap Industries
- Carpeting Jute Mills
- Chandpur Jute Mills
- Chittagong Jute Mills
- Co-operative Jute Mills
- Crescent Jute Mills
- Delta Jute Mills
- Dacca Jute Mills
- Dawood Jute Mills
- Eastern Jute Mills
- Fauji Chatkal Jute Mills
- Gul Ahmed Jute Mills
- Hafez Jute Mills
- Hamedia Jute Mill
- Hussain Jute Mills
- Jabbar Jute Mills
- Janata Jute Mills
- Jessore Jute Mills
- Karim Jute Mills
- Kohinoor Jute Mills
- Latif Bawany Jute Mills
- Maqbular Rahman Jute Mills
- M. M. Jute Mills
- Mohsen Jute Mills
- Meghna Jute Mills
- Munawar Jute Mills
- National Jute Mills
- Nawab Abdul Malek Jute Mills
- Nawab H. Askari Jute Mills
- Nishat Jute Mills
- New Dacca Industries
- Pak. (Bangladesh) Jute Mills
- Pakistan (Bangladesh) Fabric Co.
- People's Jute Mills
- Pubali Jute Mills
- Purbachal Jute Mills
- R R. Jute Mills
- Sarwar Jute Mills
- Sattar Jute Mills
- S. K. M. Jute Mills
- Sonali Jute Mills
- Star Jute Mills
- Star Alkaid Jute Mills
- Sultana Jute Mills
- Taj Jute Backing Co
- United Jute Mills
- Victory Jute Products
- W. Rahman Jute Mills
- Daulatpur Jute Mills
- Mymensingh Jute Mills
- Nabarun Jute Mills
- Platinum Jubilee Jute Mills
- Qaumi Jute Mills
- Mashriqui Jute Mills
- Associate Bagg. Co.
- Bangladesh Fabric Co.
- Sonar Bangladesh Jute Mills
- Gawsia Jute Mills
- N. Askari Jute Mills
- Transocean Fibre Processors
- Amin Old Field
- N. A. Malek Jute Mills
- M. R. Jute Mills
- Banani Jute Mills
- Mills Furnishing
