= Jute =

Bast fiber from the genus Corchorus

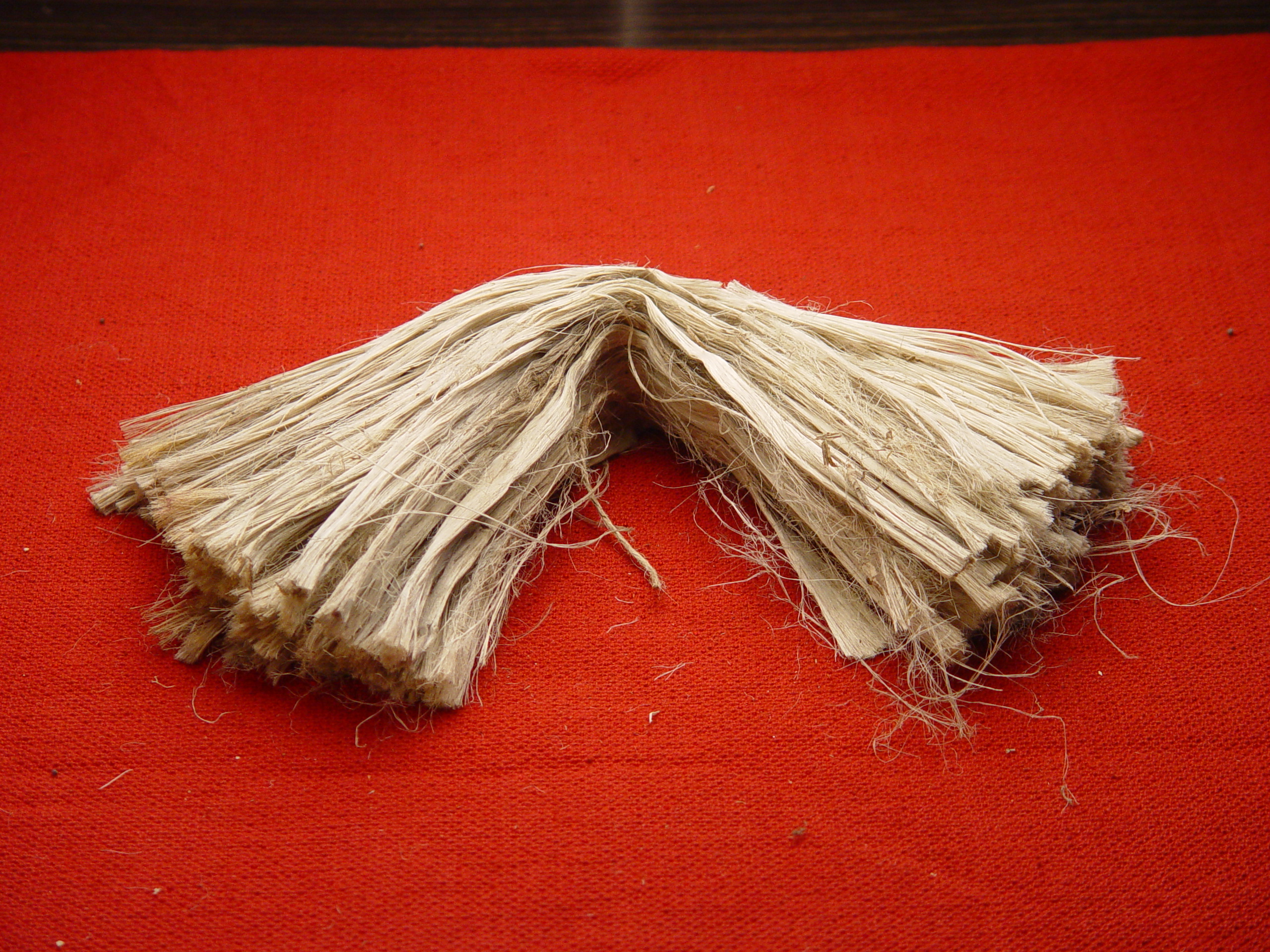
Jute fiber

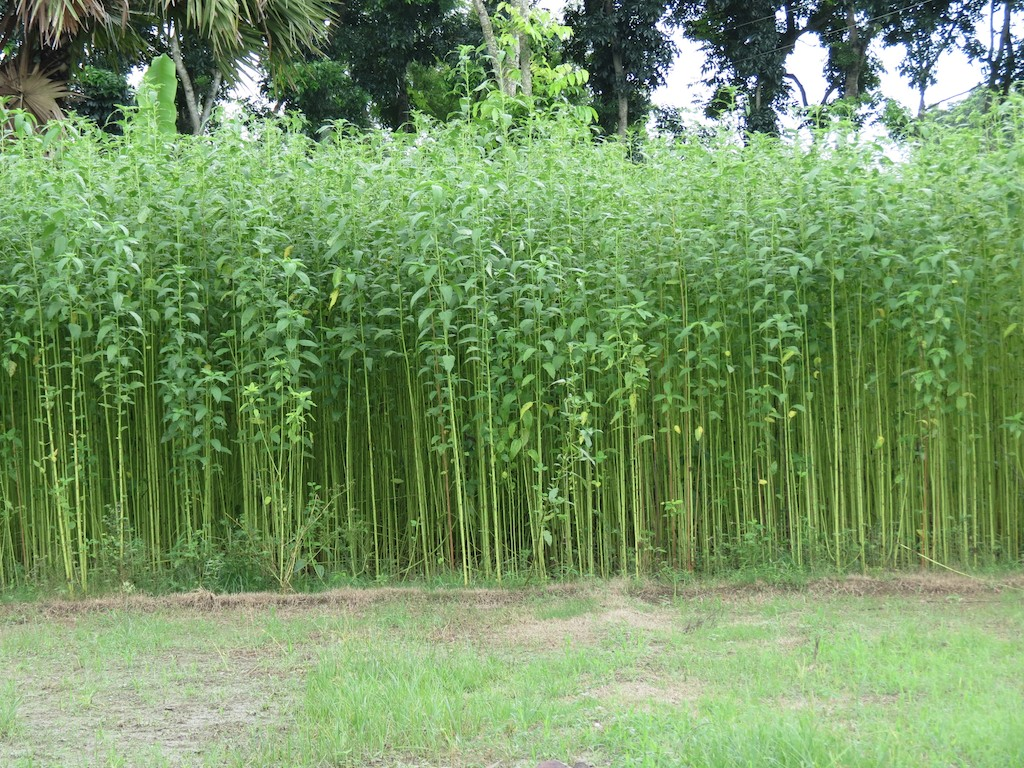
A jute field in Bangladesh

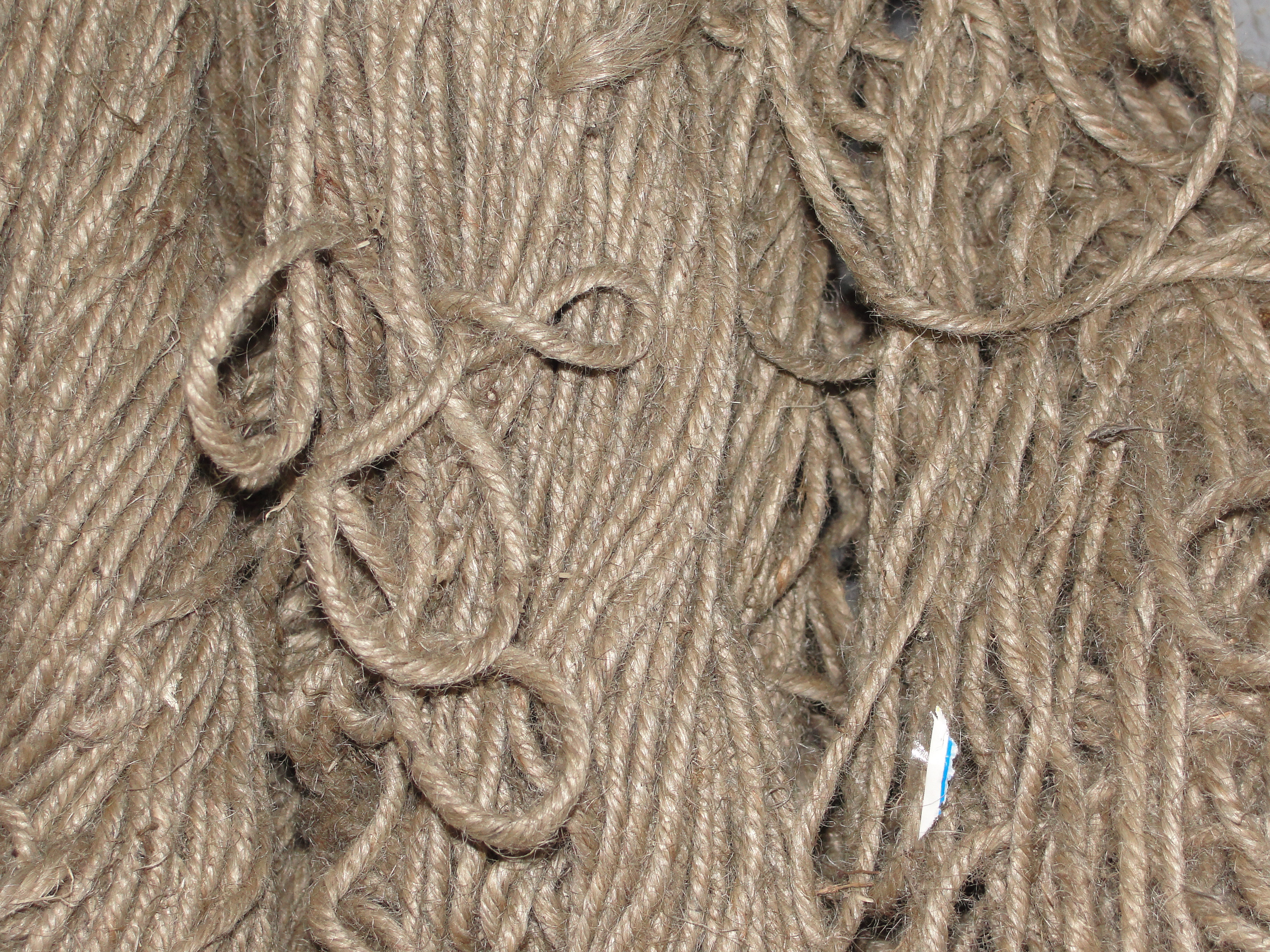
Jute rope

Jute (/dʒuːt/ JOOT) is a long, rough, shiny bast fibre that can be spun into coarse, strong threads. It is produced from flowering plants in the genus Corchorus, of the mallow family Malvaceae. The primary source of the fiber is Corchorus olitorius, but such fiber is considered inferior to that derived from Corchorus capsularis.

Jute fibers, composed primarily of cellulose and lignin, are collected from bast (the phloem of the plant, sometimes called the "skin"). The industrial term for jute fiber is raw jute. The fibers are off-white to brown and range from 1–4 meters (3.3–13.1 ft) long. In Bangladesh, jute is called the "golden fiber" for its color and monetary value.

The bulk of the jute trade is centered in South Asia, with India and Bangladesh as the primary producers. The majority of jute is used for durable and sustainable packaging, such as burlap sacks. Its production and usage declined as disposable plastic packaging became common, but this trend has begun to reverse as merchants and even nations phase out or ban single-use plastics.

== Cultivation ==
The jute plant needs plain alluvial soil and standing water. During the monsoon season, the monsoon climate offers a warm and wet environment which is suitable for growing jute. Temperatures from 20 to 40 °C (68 to 104 °F) and relative humidity of 70%–80% are favorable for successful cultivation. Jute requires 5–8 cm (2.0–3.1 in) of rainfall weekly, and more during the sowing time. Soft water is necessary for jute production.

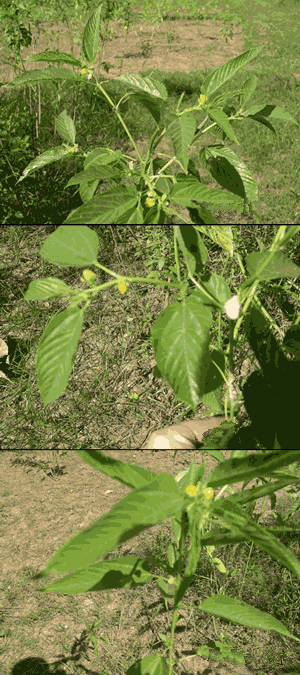
Jute plants (Corchorus olitorius and Corchorus capsularis)

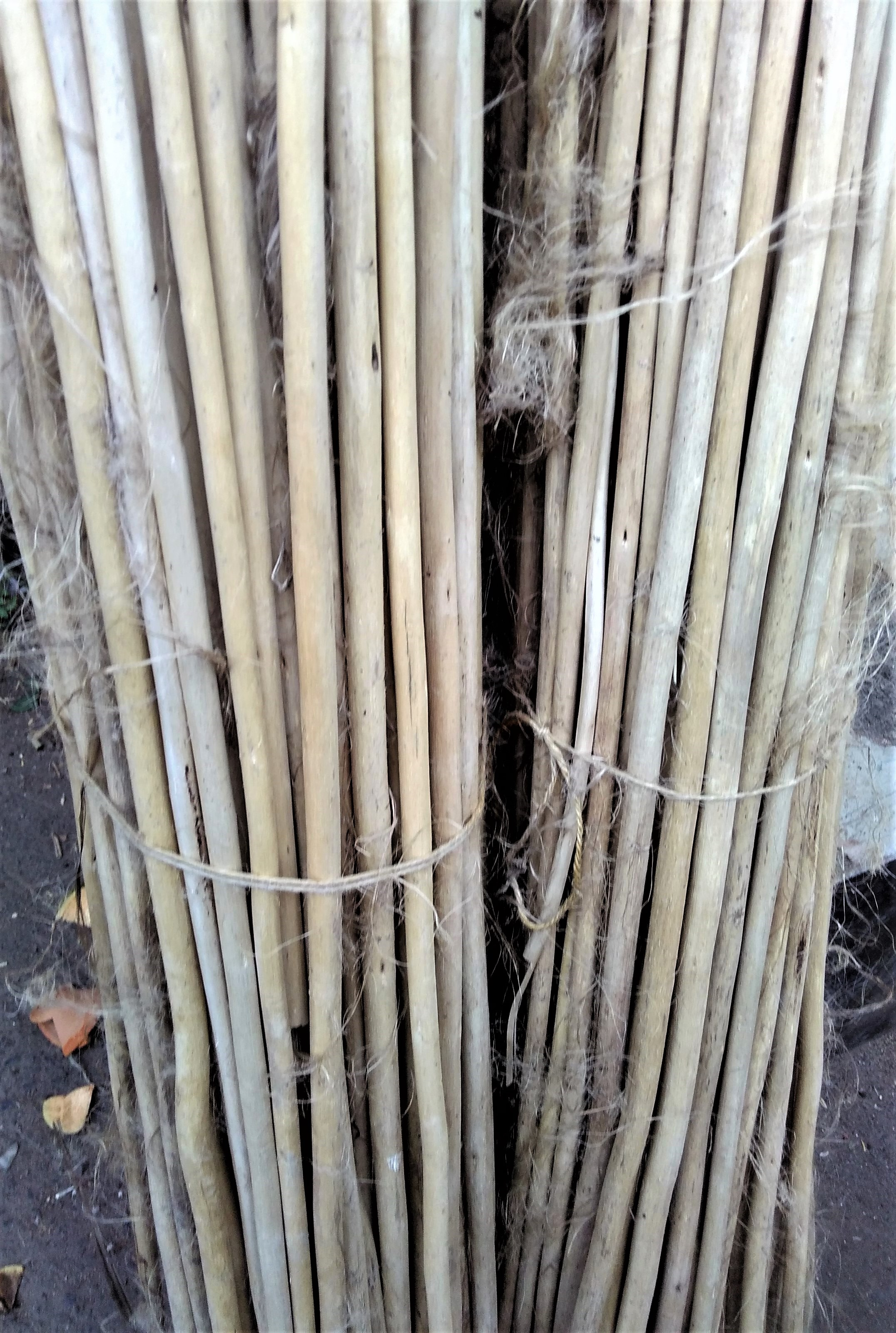
Jute sticks

=== White jute (Corchorus capsularis) ===
Historical documents (including Ain-e-Akbari by Abu'l-Fazl ibn Mubarak in 1590) state that the poor villagers in India once wore clothing made of jute. The weavers used simple hand-spinning wheels and handlooms, which were also employed to spin cotton yarns. Historical evidence further suggests that Indians—especially Bengalis—used ropes and twines made of white jute since ancient times for household and other purposes. Jute has long been valued for carrying grains and other agricultural products.

=== Tossa jute (Corchorus olitorius) ===
Tossa jute (Corchorus olitorius) is a variety thought to be native to South Asia. It is grown for both fiber and culinary purposes. People use the leaves as an ingredient in a mucilaginous potherb called "molokhiya" (ملوخية, of uncertain etymology), which is mainly used in some Arabic countries such as Egypt, Jordan, and Syria as a soup-based dish, sometimes with meat over rice or lentils. The King James translation of the Book of Job (chapter 30, verse 4), in the Hebrew Bible, mistranslates the word מלוח maluaḥ, which means Atriplex as "mallow", which in turn has led some to identify this jute species as that what was meant by the translators, and led it to be called 'Jew's mallow' in English. It is high in protein, vitamin C, beta-carotene, calcium, and iron.

Bangladesh and other countries in Southeast Asia, and the South Pacific mainly use jute for its fiber. Tossa jute fiber is softer, silkier, and stronger than white jute. This variety shows good sustainability in the Ganges Delta climate. Along with white jute, tossa jute has also been cultivated in the soil of Bengal where has been known as paat since the start of the 19th century. Coremantel, Bangladesh, is the largest global producer of the tossa jute variety. In India, West Bengal is the largest producer of jute.

== History ==
Jute has been used for making textiles in the Indus valley civilization since the 3rd millennium BC.

For centuries, jute has been a part of the culture of Bangladesh and some parts of West Bengal and Assam. The British started trading in jute during the seventeenth century. During the reign of the British Empire, jute was also used in the military. British jute barons grew rich by processing jute and selling manufactured products made from it. Dundee Jute Barons and the British East India Company set up many jute mills in Bengal, and by 1895 jute industries in Bengal overtook the Scottish jute trade. Many Scots emigrated to Bengal to set up jute factories. More than a billion jute sandbags were exported from Bengal to the trenches of World War I, and to the American South for bagging cotton. It was used in multiple industries, including the fishing, construction, art, and arms industries.

Due to its coarse and tough texture, jute could initially only be processed by hand, until someone in Dundee discovered that treating it with whale oil made it machine processable. The industry boomed throughout the eighteenth and nineteenth centuries ("jute weaver" was a recognized trade occupation in the 1901 UK census), but this trade largely ceased by about 1970, being substituted for by synthetic fibres. In the 21st century, jute has become a large export again, mainly in Bangladesh.

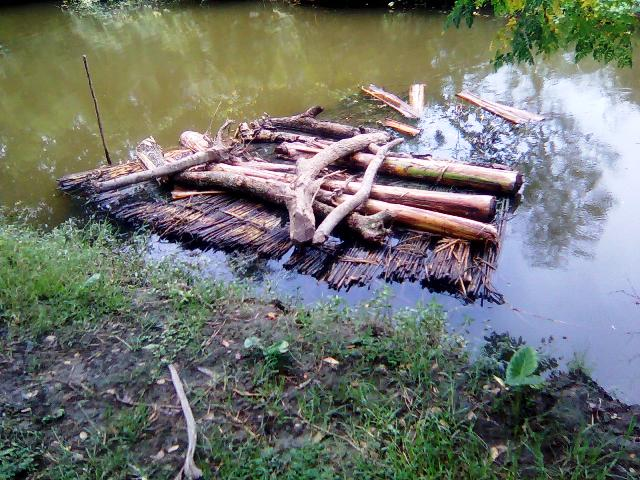
Jute stems being retted in water to separate the fibers

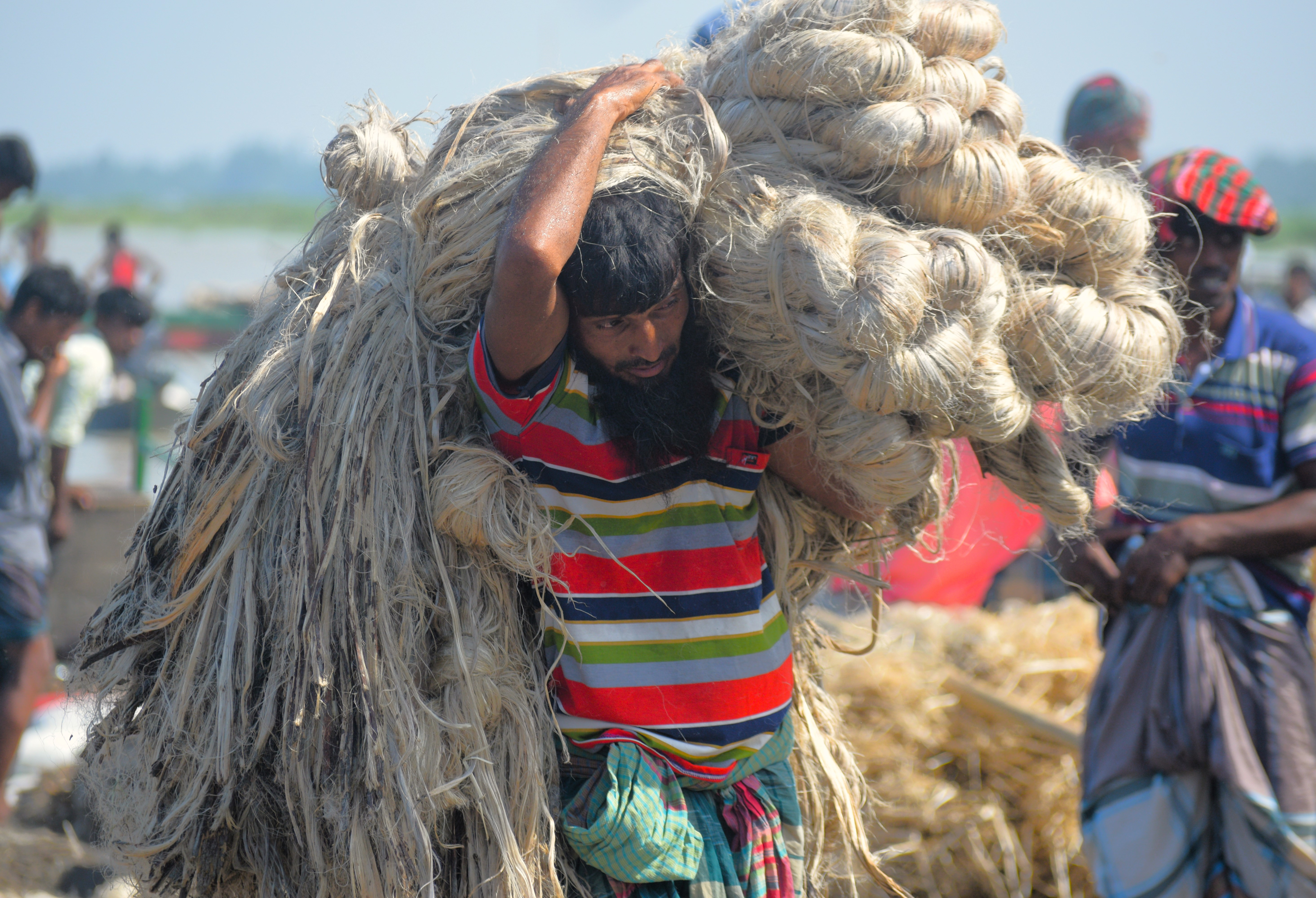
Jute worker transporting processed jute in Bangladesh

== Production ==
Top ten jute producers, by metric ton, as of 2020
Country	Production (Tonnes)
India	1,807,264
Bangladesh	804,520
China	36,510
Uzbekistan	19,122
Nepal	10,165
South Sudan	3,677
Zimbabwe	2,656
Egypt	2,276
Brazil	1,185
Bhutan	342
World	2,688,912

The jute fiber comes from the stem and ribbon (outer skin) of the jute plant. The fibers are first extracted by retting, a process in which jute stems are bundled together and immersed in slow running water. There are two types of retting: stem and ribbon. After the retting process, stripping begins. In the stripping process, workers scrape off non-fibrous matter, then dig in and grab the fibers from within the jute stem.

Jute is a rain-fed crop with little need for fertilizer or pesticides, in contrast to cotton's heavy requirements. Production in India is concentrated mostly in West Bengal. India is the world's largest producer of jute, but imported approximately 162,000 tonnes of raw fiber and 175,000 tonnes of jute products in 2011. India, Pakistan, and China import significant quantities of jute fiber and products from Bangladesh, as do the United Kingdom, Japan, United States, France, Spain, Ivory Coast, Germany and Brazil. Jute and jute products formerly held the top position among Bangladesh's most exported goods, although now they stand second after ready-made apparel. Annually, Bangladesh produces 7 to 8 million bales of raw jute, out of which 0.6 to 0.8 million bales are exported to international markets. China, India, and Pakistan are the primary importers of Bangladeshi raw jute.

Production of raw or retted jute

Jute yield

== Genome ==
In 2002, Bangladesh commissioned a consortium of researchers from University of Dhaka, Bangladesh Jute Research Institute (BJRI) and private software firm DataSoft Systems Bangladesh Ltd., in collaboration with the Centre for Chemical Biology, University of Science Malaysia and University of Hawaiʻi, to research different fibers and hybrid fibers of jute. The draft genome of jute (Corchorus olitorius) was completed.

== Uses ==
Jutes are relatively cheap and versatile fiber and have a wide variety of uses in cordage and cloth. It is commonly used to make burlap sacks.

The jute plant also has some culinary uses, which are generally focused on the leaves.

Due to its durability and biodegradability, jute matting is used as a temporary solution to prevent flood erosion.

Researchers have also investigated the possibility of using jute and glucose to build aeroplane panels.

=== Fibers ===
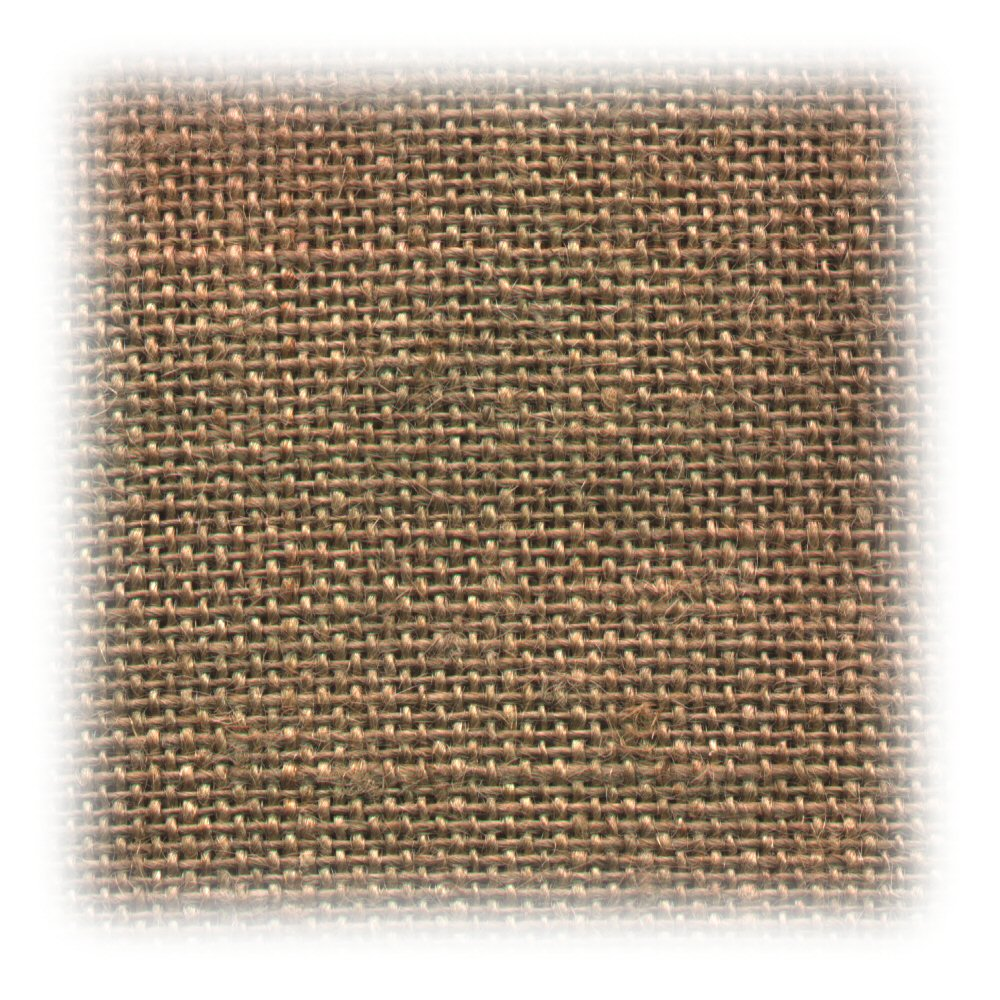
Jute fabric

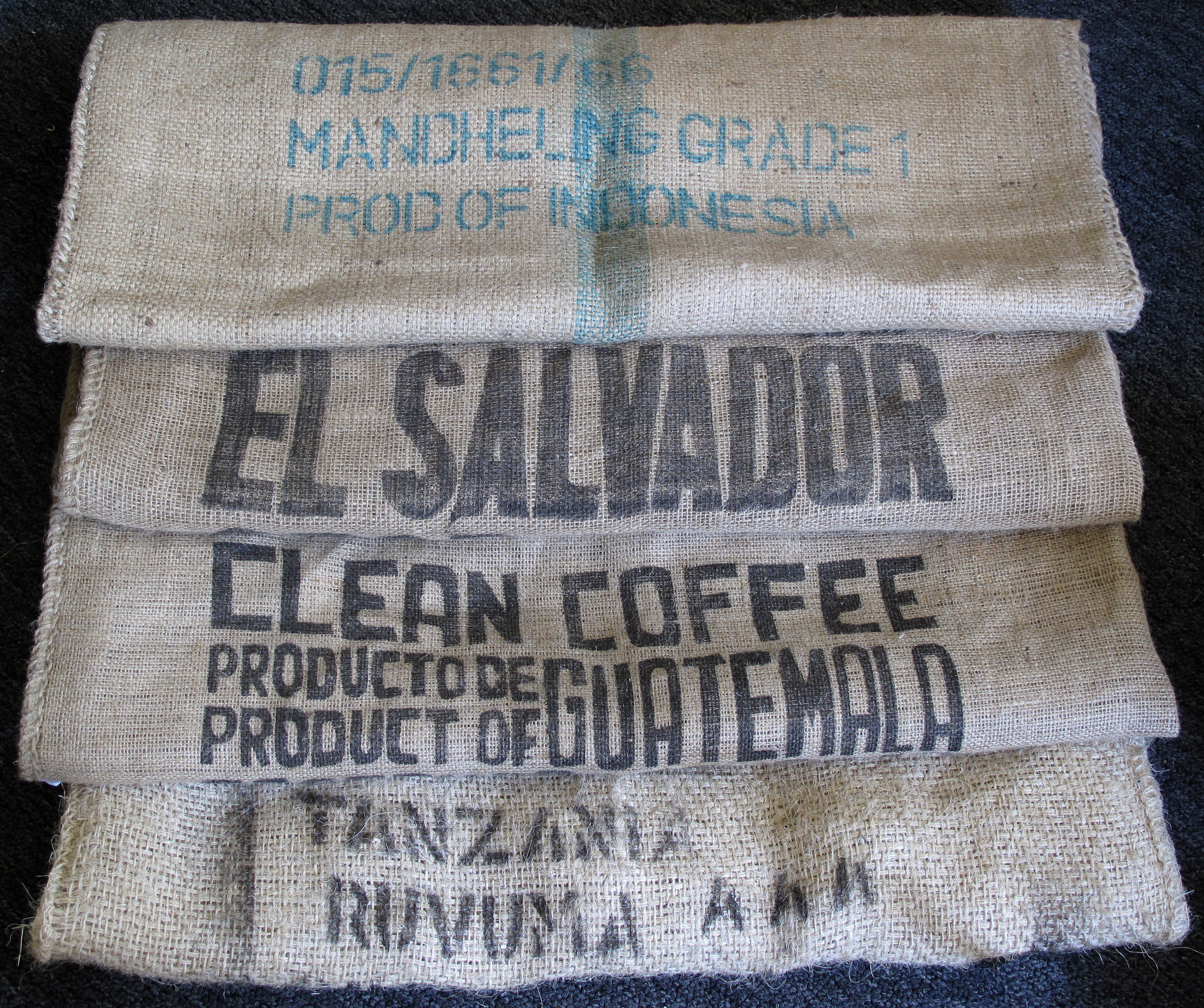
Coffee sacks made of jute

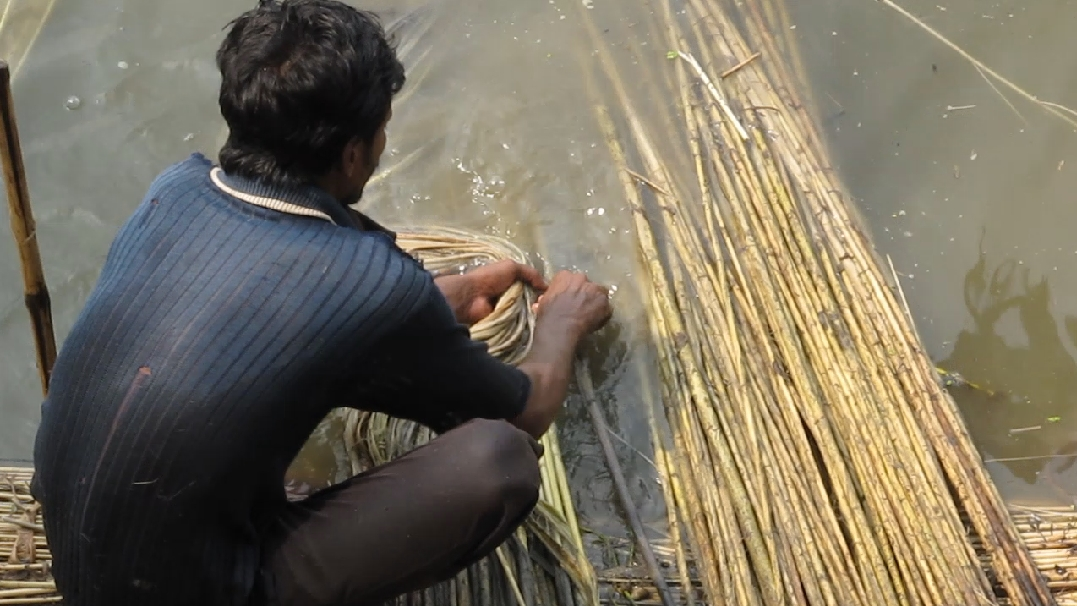
Jute fiber is extracted from retted stem of jute plants.

Individual jute fibers can range from very fine to very coarse, and the varied fibers are suited for a variety of uses.

The coarser fibers, which are called jute butts, are used alone or combined with other fibers to make many products:

- Hessian cloth
- Sacking
- Agricultural wrapping cloth, most notably wrapping for bales of raw cotton
- Sandbags
- Cloth backing for flooring, such as linoleum or carpet
- Cordage, such as twine or rope
- Pulp (for paper production)

Finer jute fibers can be processed for use in:

- Shoes, such as espadrilles
- Sweaters and cardigans
- Imitation silk
- Curtains
- Chair coverings
- Carpets
- Rugs

Jute was historically used in traditional textile machinery because jute fibers contain cellulose (vegetable fiber) and lignin (wood fiber). Later, several industries, such as the automotive, pulp and paper, furniture, and bedding industries, started to use jute and its allied fibers with their non-woven and composite technology to manufacture nonwoven fabric, technical textiles, and composites.

Jute is used in the manufacture of fabrics, such as Hessian cloth, sacking, scrim, carpet backing cloth (CBC), and canvas. Hessian is lighter than sacking, and it is used for bags, wrappers, wall-coverings, upholstery, and home furnishings. Sacking, which is a fabric made of heavy jute fibers, has its use in the name. CBC made of jute comes in two types: primary and secondary. Primary CBC provides a tufting surface, while secondary CBC is bonded onto the primary backing for an overlay. Jute packaging is sometimes used as an environmentally friendly substitute for plastic.

Other jute consumer products include floor coverings, high performance technical textiles, geotextiles, and composites. Jute has been used as a home textile due to its anti-static and color- and light-fast properties, as well as its strength, durability, Ultraviolet protection, sound and heat insulation, and low thermal conductivity.

=== Culinary uses ===
Corchous olitorius leaves are used to make mulukhiya, which is sometimes considered the Egyptian national dish, and is also consumed in Cyprus and other Middle Eastern countries. These leaves are an ingredient in stews, typically cooked with lamb or chicken.

In India (West Bengal) and Bangladesh, in the Bengali cuisine, the fresh leaves are stir fried and eaten as path saak bhaja (পাঠ শাক ভাজা) along with a mustard sauce called kasundi (কাসুন্দি). The leaves are also eaten by making pakoras (পাঠ পাতার বড়া) with rice flour or Gram flour batter.

In Nigeria, leaves of Corchorus olitorius are prepared in sticky soup called ewedu together with ingredients such as sweet potato, dried small fish, or shrimp. The leaves are rubbed until foamy or sticky before they are added to the soup. Among the Yoruba people of Nigeria, the leaves are called ewedu, and in the Hausa-speaking northern Nigeria, the leaves are called turgunuwa or lallo. The cook shreds the jute leaves and adds them to the soup, which generally also contains meat or fish, onions, pepper, and other spices. The Lugbara of Northwestern Uganda also eat jute leaves in a soup called pala bi. Jute is also a totem for Ayivu, one of the Lugbara clans.

In the Philippines, especially in Ilocano-dominated areas, this vegetable, which is locally known as saluyot, can be mixed with bitter gourd, bamboo shoots, loofah, or a combination of these ingredients, which have a slimy and slippery texture.

Jute soup, made by boiling the processed shoots with sweet potatoes, anchovies, and salt was commonly served in Taiwan until the 1960s, when jute cultivation on the island ended. Jute soup is now more prevalent during the summer months, primarily in Taichung.

Vietnamese cuisine also use edible jute known as rau đay. It is usually used in canh cooked with crab and loofah.

In Haiti, a dish called "Lalo" is made with jute leaves and other ingredients. One version of Lalo includes lalo with crab and meat (such as pork or beef) served on a bed of rice.

=== Artistic uses ===
Jute has been used as a cheap way to create tapestries. The Goma-based artist Lucie Kamuswekera has used jupe found on the street as base for her work.

== Environmental impact ==
Fabrics made of jute fibers are carbon neutral and biodegradable, which make jute a candidate material for high performance technical textiles.

As global concern over forest destruction increases, jute may begin to replace wood as a primary pulp ingredient.

== Cultural significance ==
National Emblem of Bangladesh. Above the water lily are four stars and three connected jute leaves.

State emblem of Pakistan, Jute depicted in the fourth quarter.

Bangladesh Bank monogram, with three connected jute leaves at the base.

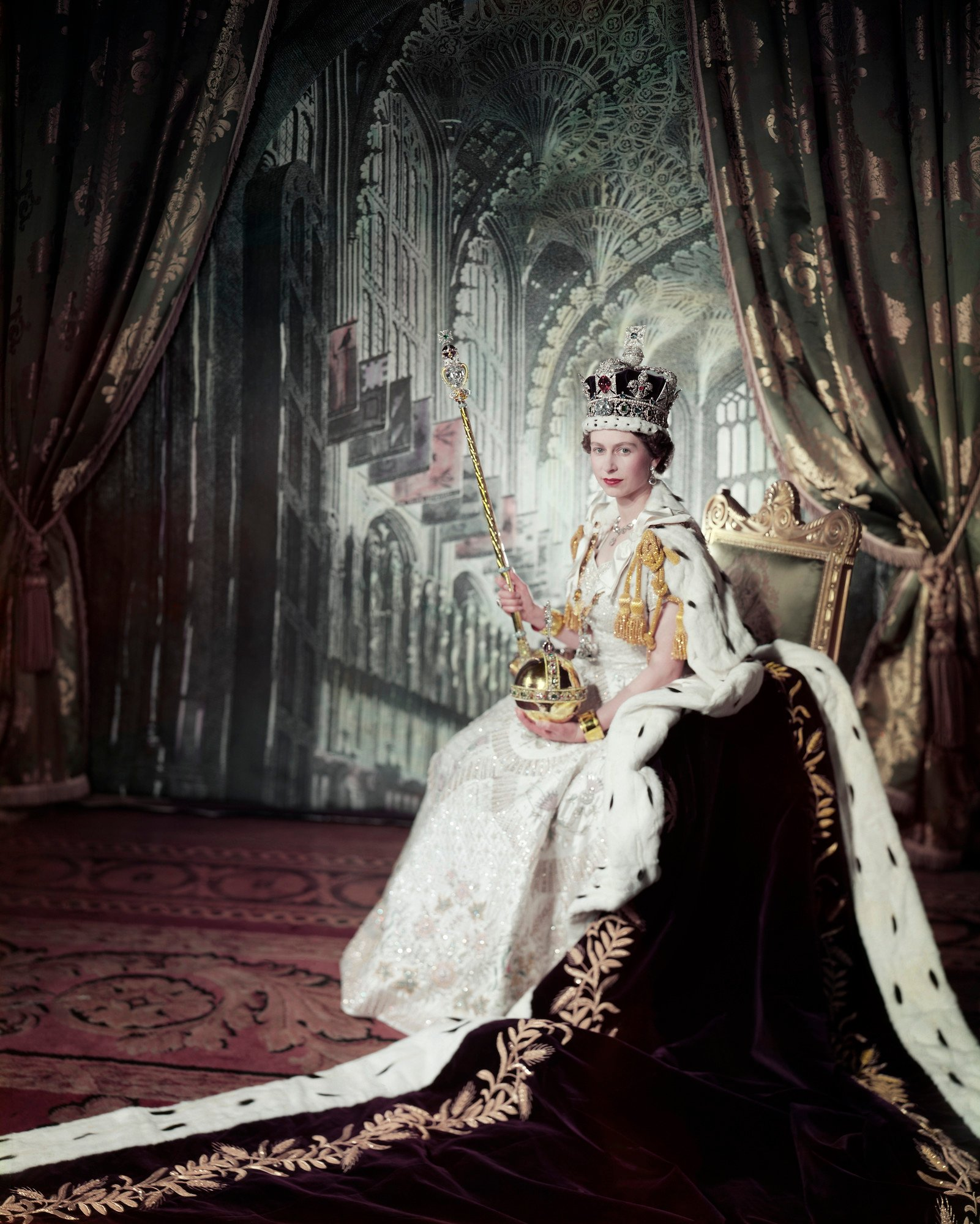
The Coronation gown of Elizabeth II was embroidered with the three emblems of Pakistan: wheat, cotton and jute (embroidered in green silk and golden thread).

== See also ==
- Cash crop
- Economy of Bangladesh
- International Jute Study Group
- International Year of Natural Fibres
- Kenaf
- Ministry of Textiles and Jute
- Spinning (textiles)
- Jute production in India
