= Coleophora ichthyura =

Scientific classification
- Kingdom: Animalia
- Phylum: Arthropoda
- Class: Insecta
- Order: Lepidoptera
- Family: Coleophoridae
- Genus: Coleophora
- Species: C. ichthyura

Binomial name
- Coleophora ichthyura Falkovitsh, 1976

Species of moth

Coleophora ichthyura is a moth of the family Coleophoridae. It is found in Tajikistan.

The larvae feed on Atraphaxis spinosa. They feed on the bast of their host plant.
