= Engage Resources =

Engage Group
- Industry: Agribusiness
- Founded: 2008; 18 years ago
- Founder: Robert Ian
- Headquarters: Bangkok, Thailand
- Key people: Robert Ian
- Products: Kenaf
- Website: http://engagegroup.com/

Engage Group is a Thailand-based producer and developer of kenaf products for use in animal feed & pet care, building materials, and industrial fibres. Kenaf is a plant native to South Asia and is characterized by a short growing cycle, high protein content, and strong fiber. The company processes and sells value-added products that are made from natural kenaf fibres, core, and leaves. By developing industrial and household products from natural fibers, the company aims to enhance local communities and the environment.

== Products ==
Engage produces industrial fibre, animal feed, thermal and sound insulation material, and pet litter and bedding. Kenaf's strong fibre interests car manufacturers and construction companies seeking to enhance or replace more expensive synthetic materials. In addition, the pulp and paper industry sees kenaf as an environmentally friendly alternative to wood pulp.

== Distribution ==
Engage's products are currently distributed in Thailand, South Korea, Hong Kong, the United States, and Europe.
