= Bast fibre =

Plant fibre used for textiles, rope, and paper

Bast fibre (also called phloem fibre or skin fibre) is plant fibre collected from the phloem (the "inner bark", sometimes called "skin") or bast surrounding the stem of certain dicotyledonous plants. Some of the economically important bast fibres are obtained from herbs cultivated in agriculture, for instance flax, hemp, or ramie, but bast fibres from wild plants, such as stinging nettle, and trees such as lime or linden, willow, oak, wisteria, and mulberry have also been used. Bast fibres are soft and flexible, as opposed to leaf fibres from monocotyledonous plants, which are hard and stiff.

Since the valuable fibres are located in the phloem, they must often be separated from the woody core, the xylem, and sometimes also from the epidermis. The process for this is retting, and can be performed by micro-organisms either on land (nowadays the most important) or in water, or by chemicals (for instance high pH and chelating agents), or by pectinolytic enzymes. In the phloem, bast fibres occur in bundles that are glued together by pectin and calcium ions. More intense retting separates the fibre bundles into elementary fibres, which can be several centimetres long. Often bast fibres have higher tensile strength than other kinds, and are used in high-quality textiles (sometimes in blends with cotton or synthetic fibres), ropes, yarn, paper, composite materials and burlap. An important property of bast fibres is that they contain a special structure, the fibre node, that represents a weak point, and gives flexibility. Seed hairs, such as cotton, do not have nodes.

== Etymology ==
The term "bast" derives from Old English bæst ("inner bark of trees from which ropes were made"), from Proto-Germanic *bastaz ("bast, rope"). It may have the same root as Latin fascis ("bundle") and Middle Irish basc ("necklace").

== Use of bast fibre ==
Plants that have been used for bast fibre include flax (from which linen is made), hemp, jute, kenaf, kudzu, linden, milkweed, nettle, okra, paper mulberry, ramie, and roselle hemp.

Bast fiber from oak trees forms the oldest preserved woven fabrics in the world. It was unearthed at the archeological site at Çatalhöyük in Turkey and dates to 8000-9000 years ago.

Dress of unspecified bast fibre, Yuracaré, Rio Chimoré, Bolivia 1908–1909.

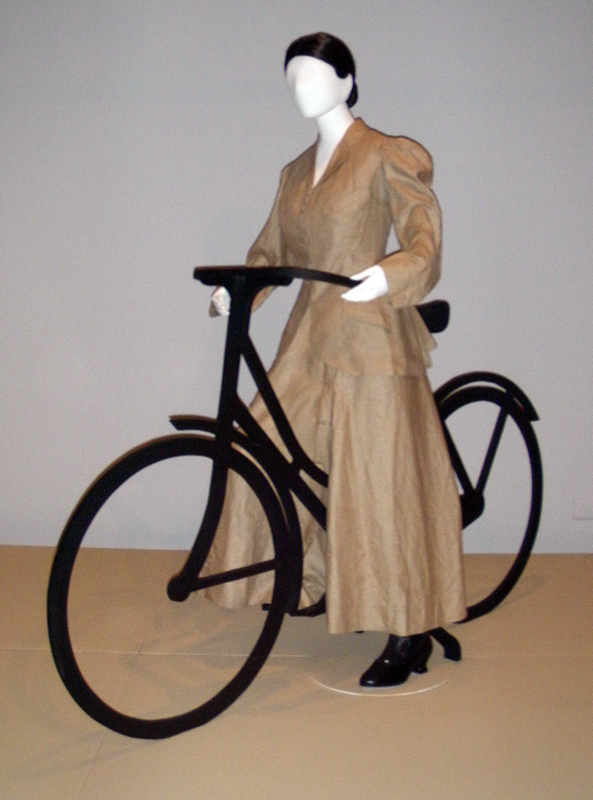
Cycling suit of linen bast fiber, New York, New York, United States, 1908

Bast fibres are processed for use in carpet, yarn, rope, geotextile (netting or matting), traditional carpets, hessian or burlap, paper, sacks, etc. Bast fibres are also used in the non-woven, moulding, and composite technology industries for the manufacturing of non-woven mats and carpets, composite boards as furniture materials, automobile door panels and headliners, etc. From prehistoric times through at least the early 20th century, bast shoes were woven from bast strips in the forest areas of Eastern Europe.

Where no other source of tanbark was available, bast has also been used for tanning leather.
