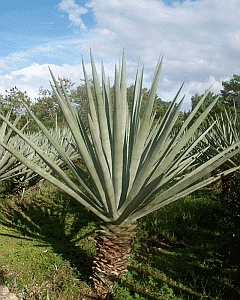

Scientific classification
- Kingdom: Plantae
- Clade: Tracheophytes
- Clade: Angiosperms
- Clade: Monocots
- Order: Asparagales
- Family: Asparagaceae
- Subfamily: Agavoideae
- Genus: Agave
- Species: A. sisalana

Binomial name
- Agave sisalana Perrine

Synonyms
- Agave amaniensis Trel. & Nowell; Agave rigida var. sisalana (Perrine) Engelm.; Agave segurae D.Guillot & P.Van der Meer; Agave sisalana var. armata Trel.; Agave sisalana f. armata (Trel.) Trel.

= Sisal =

Sisal Agave sisalana

Species of flowering plant native to Mexico

Sisal (/ˈsaɪsəl/, Spanish: [siˈsal]; Agave sisalana) is a species of flowering plant native to southern Mexico, but widely cultivated and naturalized in many other countries. It yields a stiff leaf fiber used in making rope and various other products. The sisal fiber is traditionally used for rope and twine, and has many other uses, including cloth, footwear, hats, bags, carpets, geotextiles, and dartboards. It is also used as fiber reinforcements for composite fiberglass, rubber, and concrete products. Like other agaves, the pith of the leaves can be fermented and distilled to make mezcal.

Sisal has an uncertain native origin, but is thought to have originated in the Mexican state of Chiapas. Historically, sisal was used by the Aztecs and Maya for a crude fabric. It spread to other parts of the world in the 19th century, with Brazil becoming the major producer. Global sisal production in 2020 was 210,000 tons, with Brazil being the largest producer, followed by Tanzania, Kenya, Madagascar, China, and Mexico.

Sisal is a tropical and subtropical plant, thriving in temperatures above 25 °C (77 °F) and sunshine. It is propagated using bulbils or suckers and can be improved genetically through tissue culture. Sisal plants have a lifespan of 7–10 years, producing 200–250 usable leaves containing fibers used in various applications. Fibers are extracted by crushing the leaves and are then dried, brushed, and baled for export.

Sisal farming initially led to environmental degradation, but it is now considered less damaging than other farming types. Sisal is an invasive species in Hawaii and Florida.

== Taxonomy ==
The native origin of Agave sisalana is uncertain. Traditionally, it was deemed to be a native of the Yucatán Peninsula, but no records exist of botanical collections from there. They were originally shipped from the Spanish colonial port of Sisal in Yucatán (thus the name). The Yucatán plantations now cultivate henequen (Agave fourcroydes).

H. S. Gentry hypothesized a Chiapas origin, on the strength of traditional local usage. Evidence of an indigenous cottage industry there suggests it as the original habitat location, possibly as a cross of Agave angustifolia and Agave kewensis. The species is now naturalized in other parts of Mexico, as well as in Spain, the Canary Islands, Cape Verde, Madagascar, Réunion, Seychelles, many parts of Africa, China, India, Pakistan, Nepal, Burma, Cambodia, Thailand, the Solomon Islands, Queensland, Fiji, Hawaii, Florida, Central America, Ecuador, and the West Indies.

=== Plant description ===
Sisal plants consist of a rosette of sword-shaped leaves about 1.5 to 2 m (4 ft 11 in to 6 ft 7 in) tall. Young leaves may have a few minute teeth along their margins, but lose them as they mature.

The sisal plant has a 7- to 10-year lifespan and typically produces 200–250 commercially usable leaves. Each leaf contains around 1000 fibers. The fibers account for only about 4% of the plant by weight. Sisal is considered a plant of the tropics and subtropics, since production benefits from temperatures above 25 °C (77 °F) and sunshine.

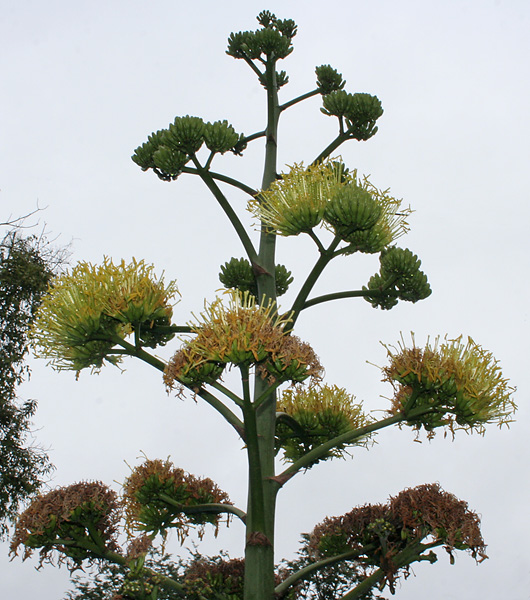
Inflorescence in Goa, India

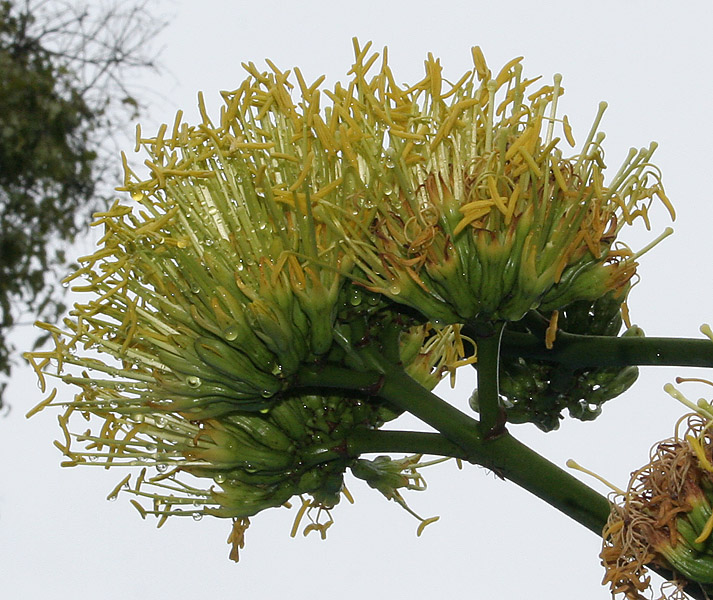
Flowers in Goa

== Cultivation ==
Sisal was used by the Aztecs and the Maya to make a fabric.

In the 19th century, sisal cultivation spread to Florida, the Caribbean islands, and Brazil (Paraiba and Bahia), as well as to countries in Africa, notably Tanzania and Kenya, and Asia. Sisal reportedly "came to Africa from Florida, through the mechanism of a remarkable German botanist, by the name of Hindorf."

In Cuba its cultivation was introduced in 1880 by Fernando Heydrich in Matanzas.

The first commercial plantings in Brazil were made in the late 1930s, and the first sisal fiber exports from there were made in 1948. Brazilian production did not accelerate until the 1960s, and the first of many spinning mills was established. Today, Brazil is the major world producer of sisal.

=== Propagation ===
Propagation of sisal is generally by using bulbils produced from buds in the flower stalk or by suckers growing around the base of the plant, which are grown in nursery fields until large enough to be transplanted to their final positions. These methods offer no potential for genetic improvement. In vitro multiplication of selected genetic material using meristematic tissue culture offers considerable potential for the development of improved genetic material.

=== Fiber extraction ===
Fiber is extracted by a process known as decortication, where leaves are crushed, beaten, and brushed away by a rotating wheel set with blunt knives, so that only fibers remain. Alternatively, in East Africa, where production is typically on large estates, the leaves are transported to a central decortication plant, where water is used to wash away the waste parts of the leaves.

The fiber is then dried, brushed, and baled for export. Proper drying is important, as fiber quality depends largely on moisture content. Artificial drying has been found to result in generally better grades of fiber than sun drying, but is not always feasible in the less industrialized countries where sisal is produced. In the drier climate of northeast Brazil, sisal is mainly grown by smallholders and the fiber is extracted by teams using portable raspadors, which do not use water.

Fiber is subsequently cleaned by brushing. Dry fibers are machine combed and sorted into various grades, largely on the basis of the previous in-field separation of leaves into size groups.

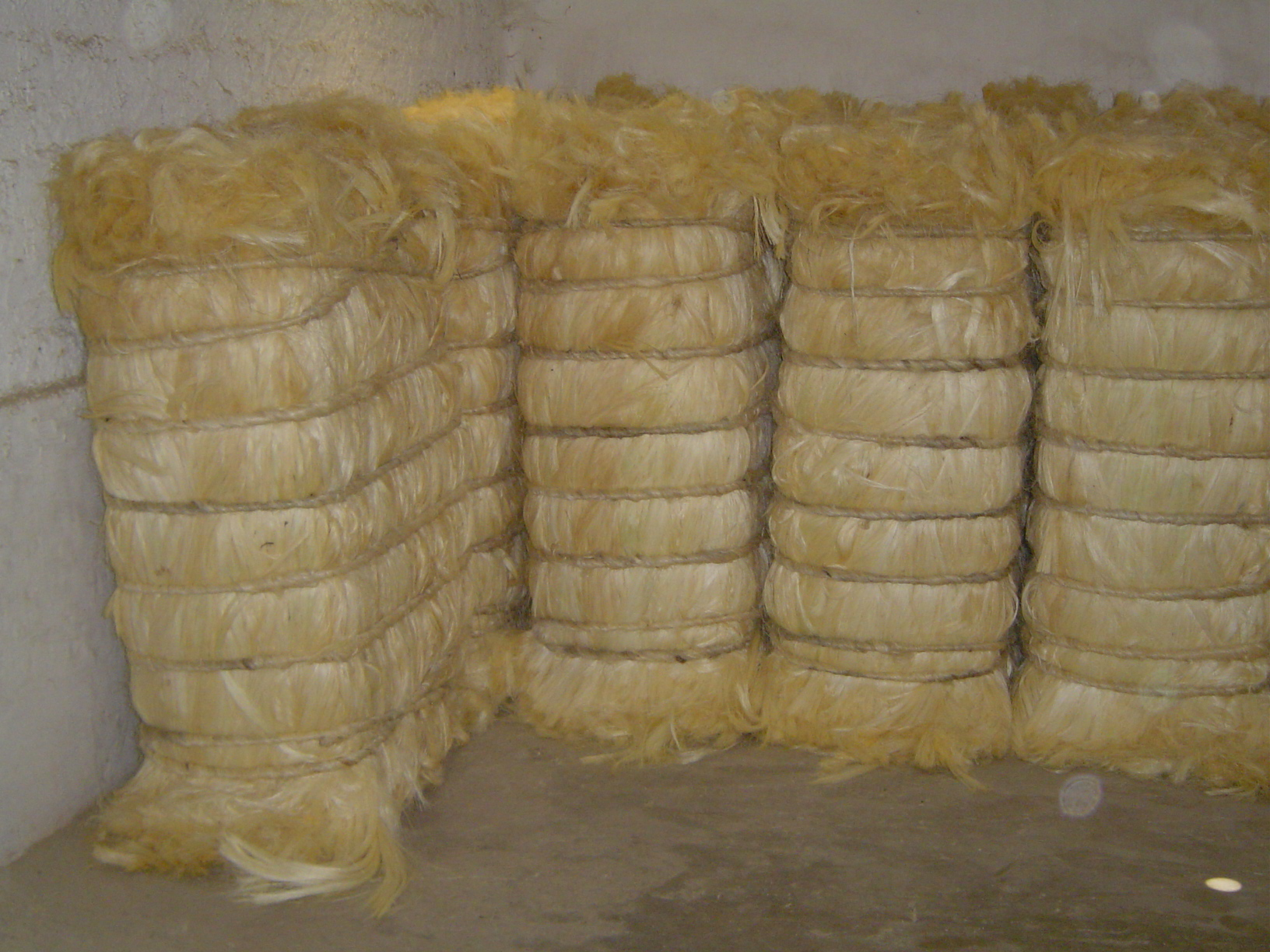
Baled Brazilian sisal fiber

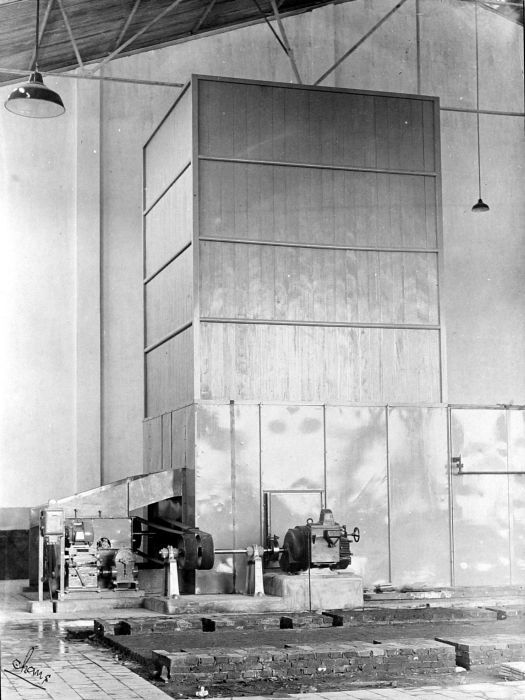
Sisal fiber drying machine in Java

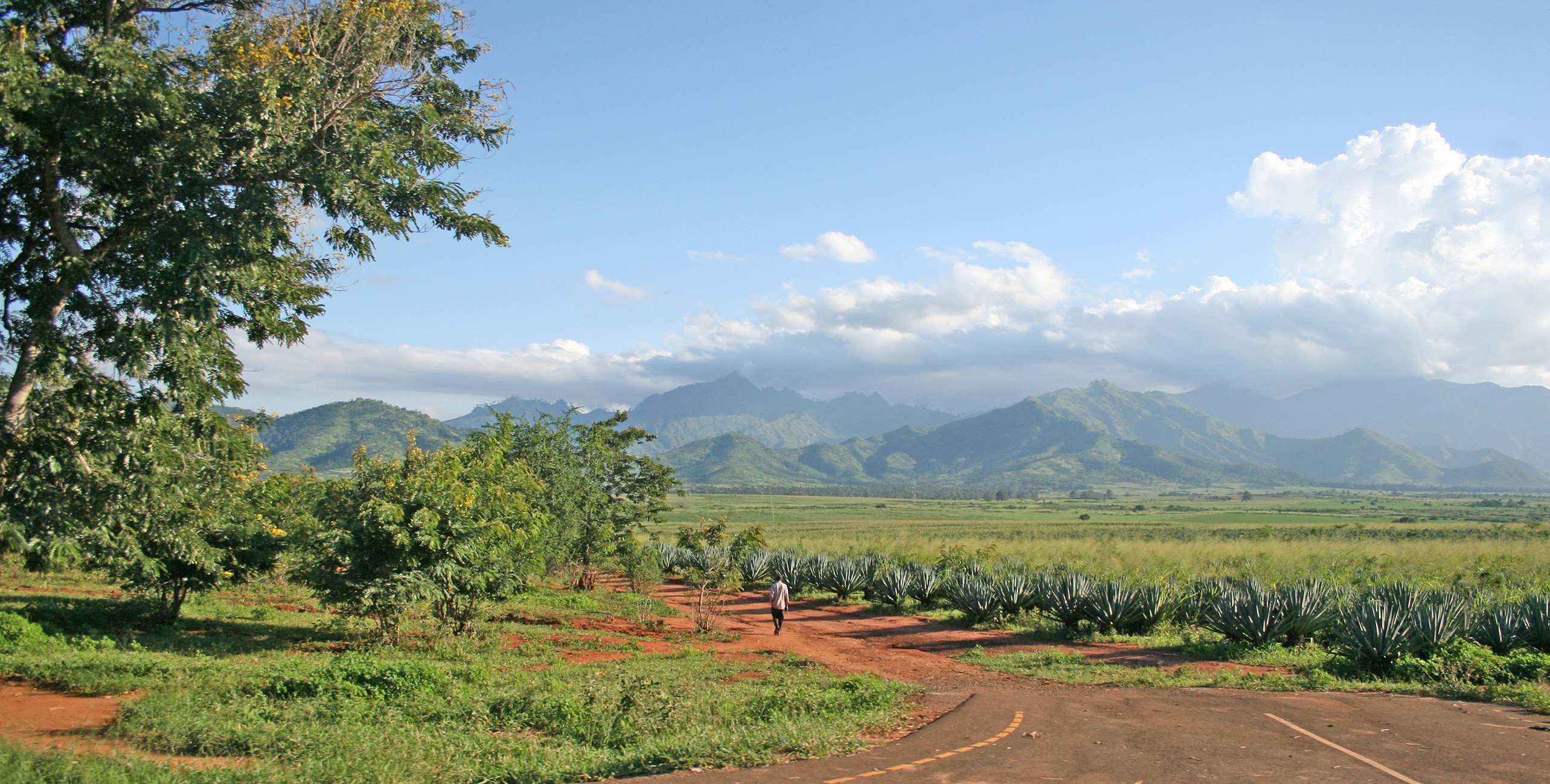
A sisal plantation in Morogoro, Tanzania: The Uluguru Mountains can be seen in the background.

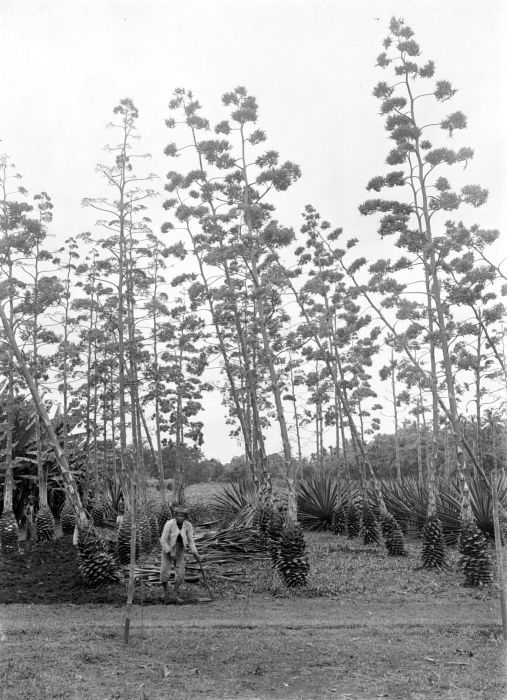
Historical image showing a sisal plantation on Java

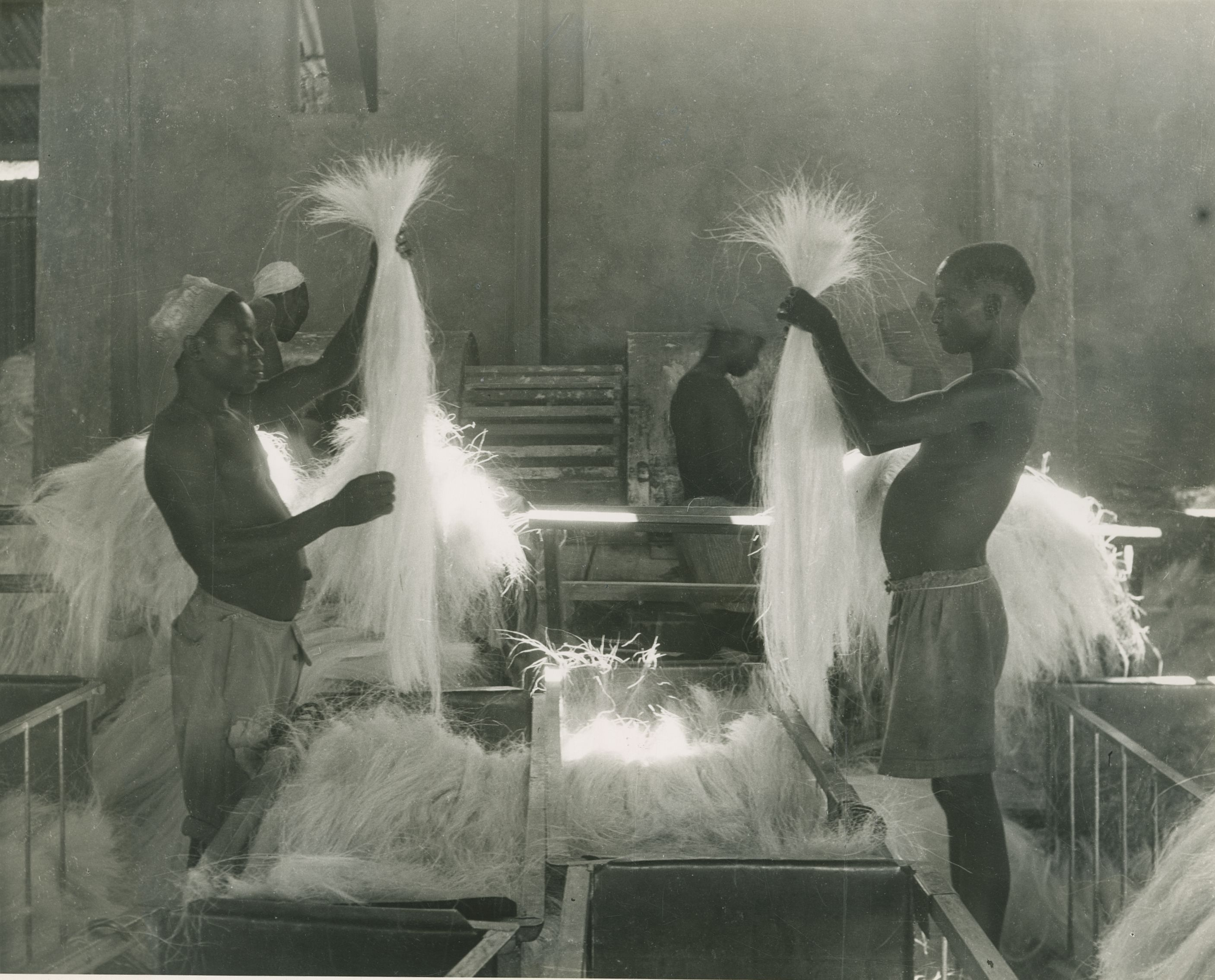
Manual selection of sisal fibers before washing

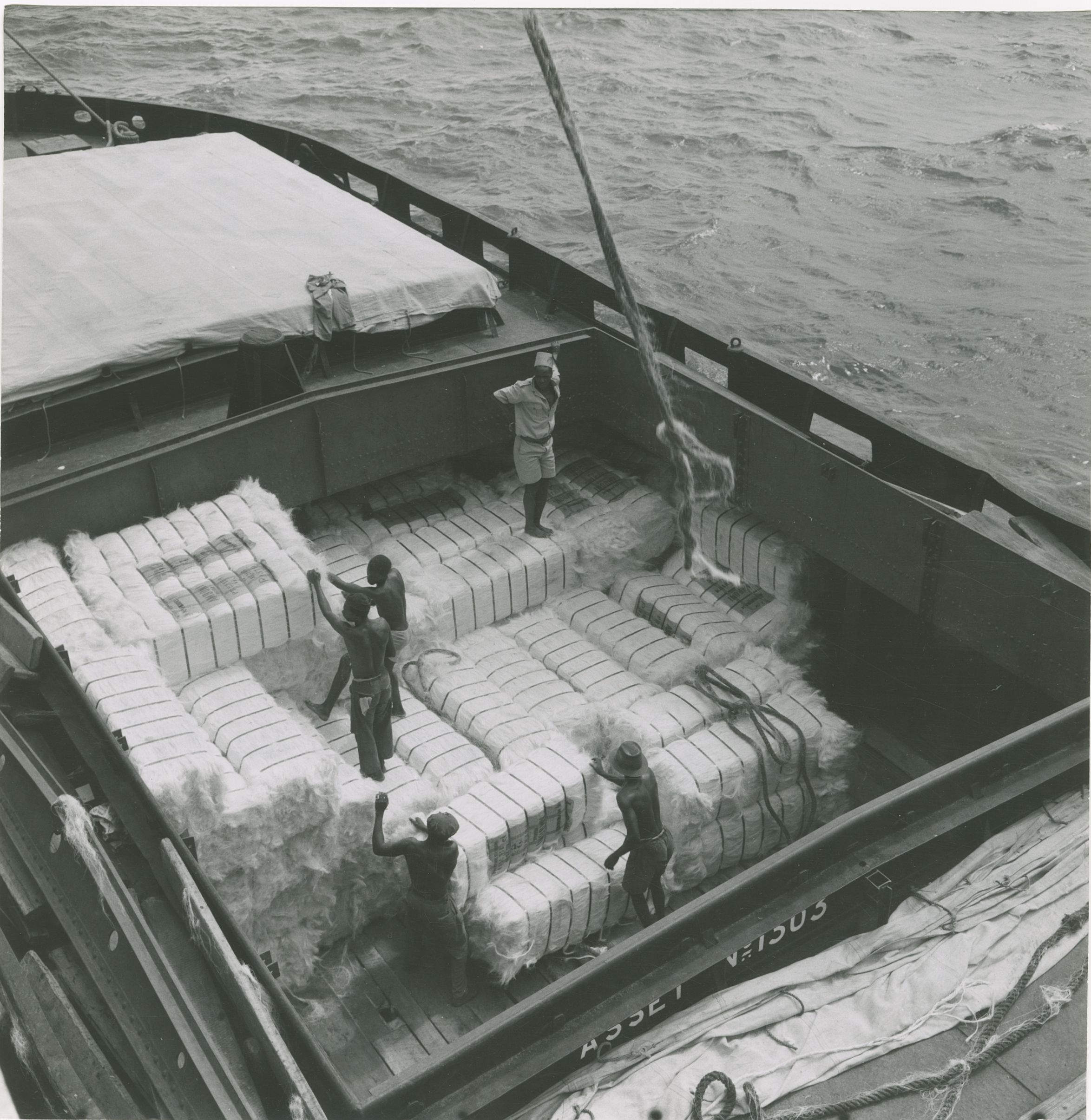
A cargo of sisal fibers on a ship in the port of Tanga in 1959

=== Environmental impacts ===
Sisal farming initially caused environmental degradation, because sisal plantations replaced native forests, but is still considered less damaging than many types of farming. No chemical fertilizers are used in sisal production, and although herbicides are occasionally used, even this impact may be eliminated, since most weeding is done by hand. The effluent from the decortication process causes serious pollution when it is allowed to flow into watercourses.

Sisal is considered to be an invasive species in Hawaii and Florida.

== Uses ==
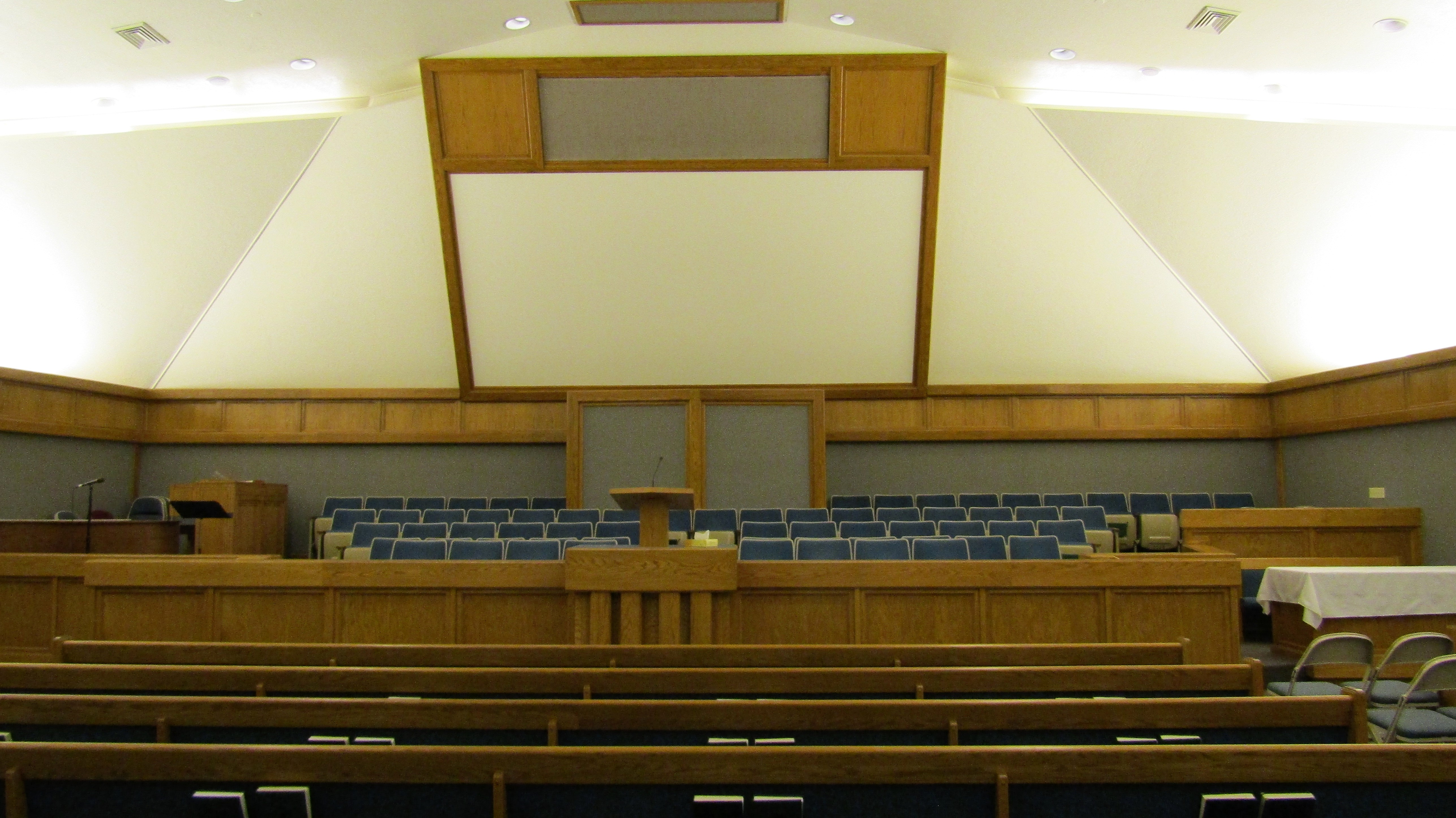
Sisal wall covering (the gray below the wooden cornice) in a Latter-day Saints meetinghouse. Due to its common use in meetinghouses, it has become a meme in Mormon culture.

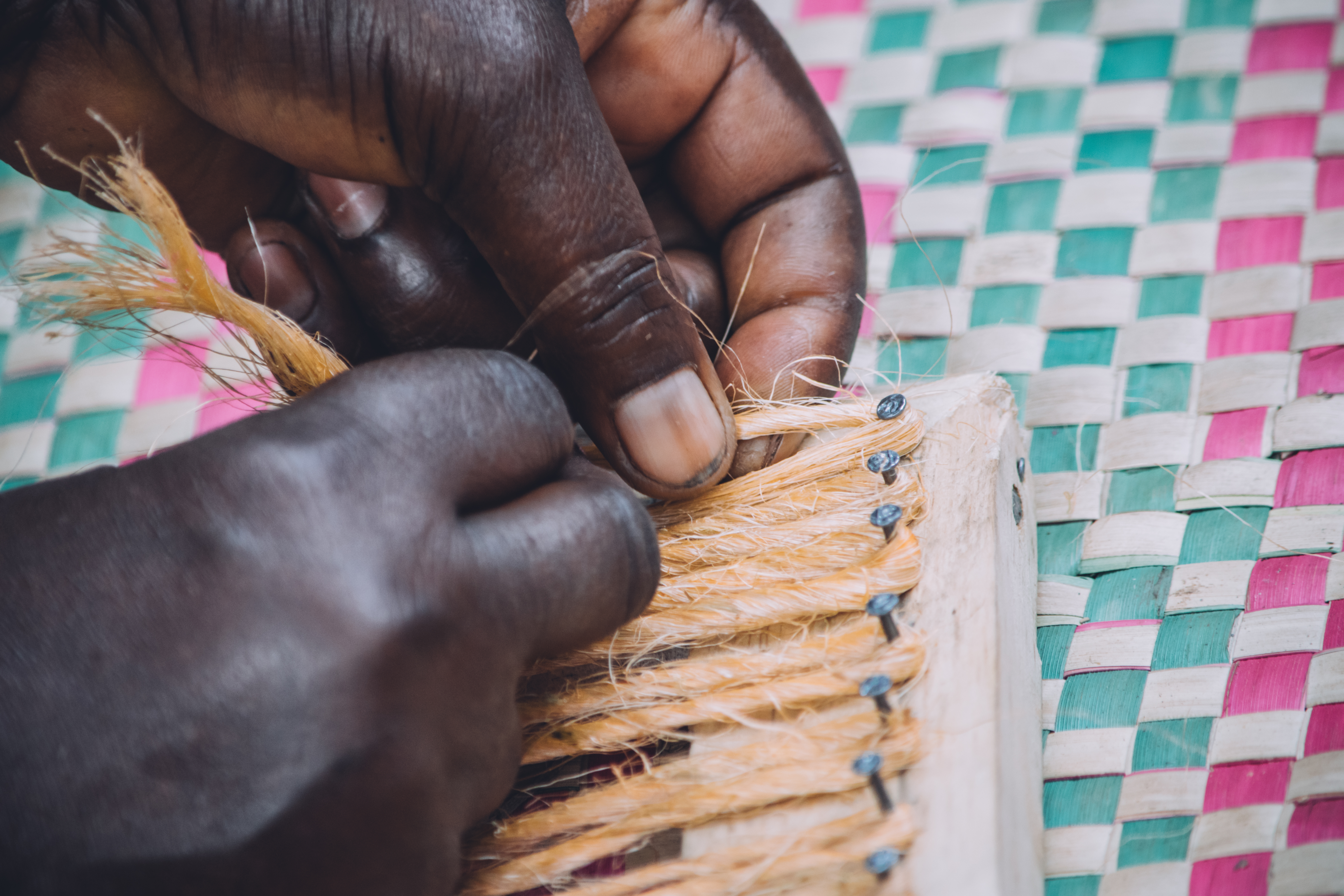
Weaving a door mat in Uganda

Traditionally, sisal has been the leading material for agricultural twine (binder twine and baler twine) because of its strength, durability, ability to stretch, affinity for certain dyestuffs, and resistance to deterioration in saltwater. The importance of this traditional use is diminishing with competition from polypropylene and the development of other haymaking techniques, while new higher-valued sisal products have been developed.

Apart from ropes, twines, and general cordage, sisal is used in low-cost and specialty paper, dartboards, buffing cloth, filters, geotextiles, mattresses, carpets, handicrafts, wire rope cores, and macramé. Sisal has been used as an environmentally friendly strengthening agent to replace asbestos and fiberglass in composite materials in various uses, including the automobile industry. The lower-grade fiber is processed by the paper industry because of its high content of cellulose and hemicelluloses. The medium-grade fiber is used in the cordage industry for making ropes and baler and binder twine. Ropes and twines are widely employed for marine, agricultural, and general industrial use. The higher-grade fiber after treatment is converted into yarns and used by the carpet industry.

Other products developed from sisal fiber include spa products, cat-scratching posts, lumbar support belts, rugs, slippers, cloths, and disc buffers. Sisal wall covering meets the abrasion and tearing resistance standards of the American Society for Testing and Materials and of the National Fire Protection Association.

Sisal walls were used very frequently in the construction of Mormon meetinghouses built between 1985 and 2010. Because of its frequent use, it has become a meme in Mormon culture.

As extraction of fiber uses only a small percentage of the plant, some attempts to improve economic viability have focused on using the waste material for production of food or biogas.

Sisal is a valuable forage for honeybees because of its long flowering period. It is particularly attractive to them during pollen shortage. The honey produced, however, is dark and has a strong and unpleasant flavor.

Because sisal is an agave, it can be fermented and distilled to make mezcal. In India, it may be an ingredient in some street snacks.

=== Carpets ===
Despite the yarn durability for which sisal is known, slight matting of sisal carpeting may occur in high-traffic areas. Sisal carpet does not build up static nor does it trap dust, so vacuuming is the only maintenance required. High-spill areas should be treated with a fiber sealer and for spot removal, a dry-cleaning powder is recommended. Depending on climatic conditions, sisal absorbs air humidity or releases it, causing expansion or contraction. Sisal is not recommended for areas that receive wet spills or rain or snow. Sisal is used by itself in carpets or in blends with wool and acrylic for a softer hand.

=== Ram kand mool ===
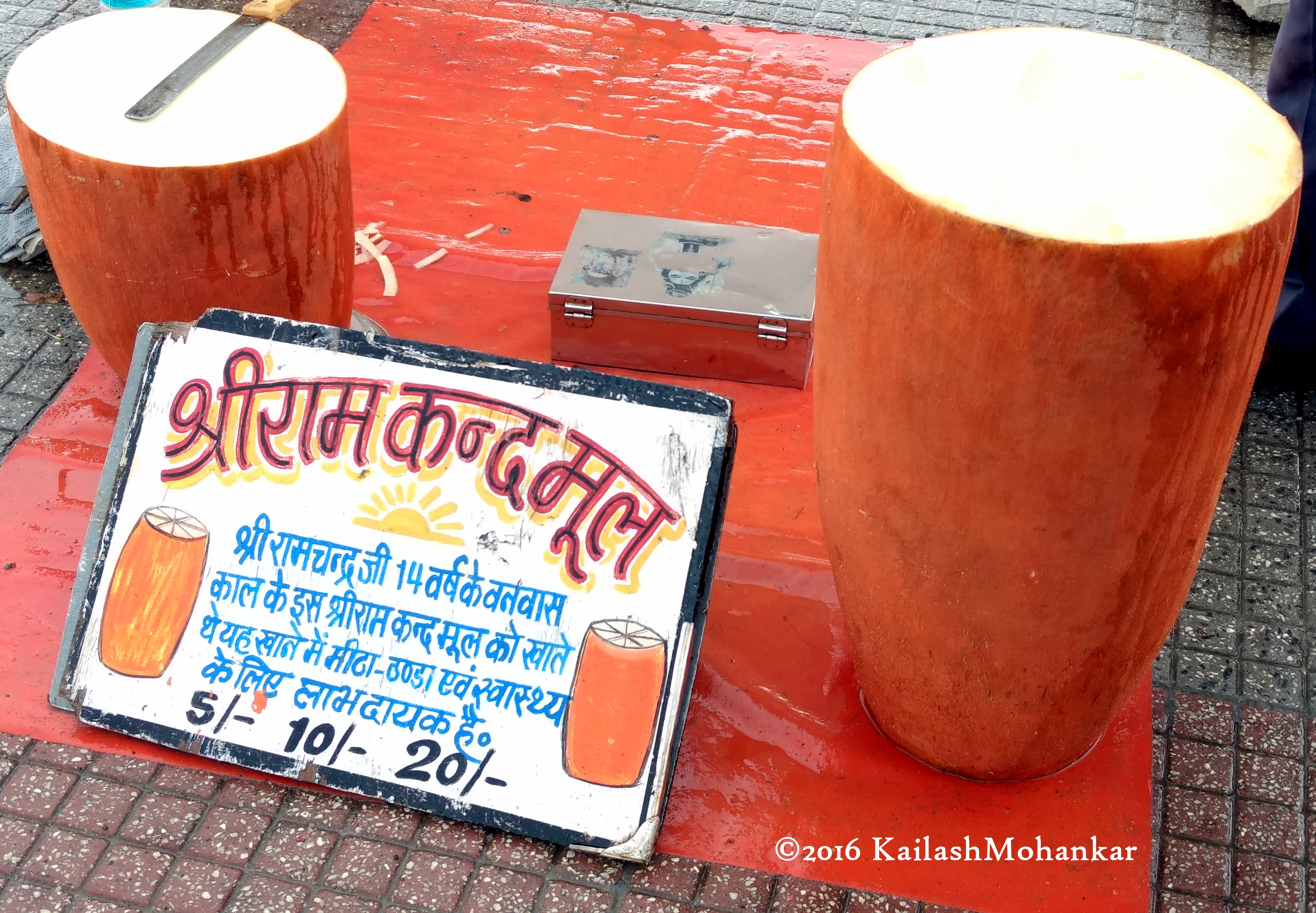
Ram kand mool being sold on a street in Bhedaghat, Madhya Pradesh

Ram kand mool is a drum-shaped tuber mainly found in Indian states of Karnataka, Andhra Pradesh, Telangana and Maharashtra. It is a lesser-known variety of tuber and root. It is the flowering stalk of century plant (Agave sisalana or sisal). According to Hindu historical texts, ram kand mool was consumed by Lord Rama, his wife Sita, and his brother Lakshmana during their exile in the forest.

In the 1980s, Indian botanists unsuccessfully tried to find more information on ram kand mool. Later in 1994, the Shivaji University, Kolhapur resorted to DNA fingerprinting to identify the ram kand mool plant and concluded that it is a variety of Agave americana. The anatomical study showed the plant is a typical monocotyledonous vascular bundle arrangement. However, this added more confusion, as monocots have adventitious roots and not a tap root system.

To determine the identity, plant material was obtained from a vendor from Jyotiba Temple in Kolhapur district, Maharashtra. Slices were brought to the laboratory and DNA was extracted from slices of ram kand mool. The plastid locus for maturase k was selected to identify the plant species. The genetic sequence was an match 89% match with the genetic sequence of Agave sisalana.

It can be found during summer. It is served as thinly cut slices as a street snack, wrapped in leaves or papers, and eaten raw. It is seasoned with honey, palm sugar, lime, salt and chilli powder. Ram kand mool is a starch-rich tuber. Some people consume ram kand mool in powdered form as part of traditional medicines.

== Global production and trade patterns ==
Major sisal producers—2020 (thousands of tonnes)
Brazil	86.1
Tanzania	36.4
Kenya	22.8
Madagascar	17.6
China	14.0
Mexico	13.1
Haiti	12.0
World total	209.9

Global production of sisal fiber in 2020 amounted to 210 thousand metric tons, of which Brazil, the largest producing country, produced 86,061 tons.

Tanzania produced about 36,379 tons, Kenya produced 22,768 tons, Madagascar 17,578 tons, and 14,006 tons were produced in China. Mexico contributed 13,107 tons with smaller amounts coming from Haiti, Morocco, Venezuela, and South Africa. Sisal occupies sixth place among fiber plants, representing 2% of the world's production of plant fiber (plant fiber provide 65% of the world's fiber).

== Heraldry ==
The sisal plant appears in the coat of arms of Barquisimeto, Venezuela.

An unofficial coat of arms for the Mexican state of Yucatán features a deer bounding over a sisal plant.

== In literature ==
Journalist John Gunther wrote of sisal in 1953, "if it had not been for the fact that sisal is a difficult crop, there might not have been a Munich in 1939. Neville Chamberlain started out life as a sisal planter in the Bahamas, and only returned to Britain and entered politics when he found that this obdurate vegetable was too hard to grow."

== See also ==
- Abacá – Species of flowering plant
- Agave fourcroydes – Species of flowering plant
- Coir – Natural fiber
- Hemp – Agricultural cannabis plant
- International Year of Natural Fibres – United Nations observance of 2009
- Jute – Bast fiber from the genus Corchorus
