= Ambadi seed oil =

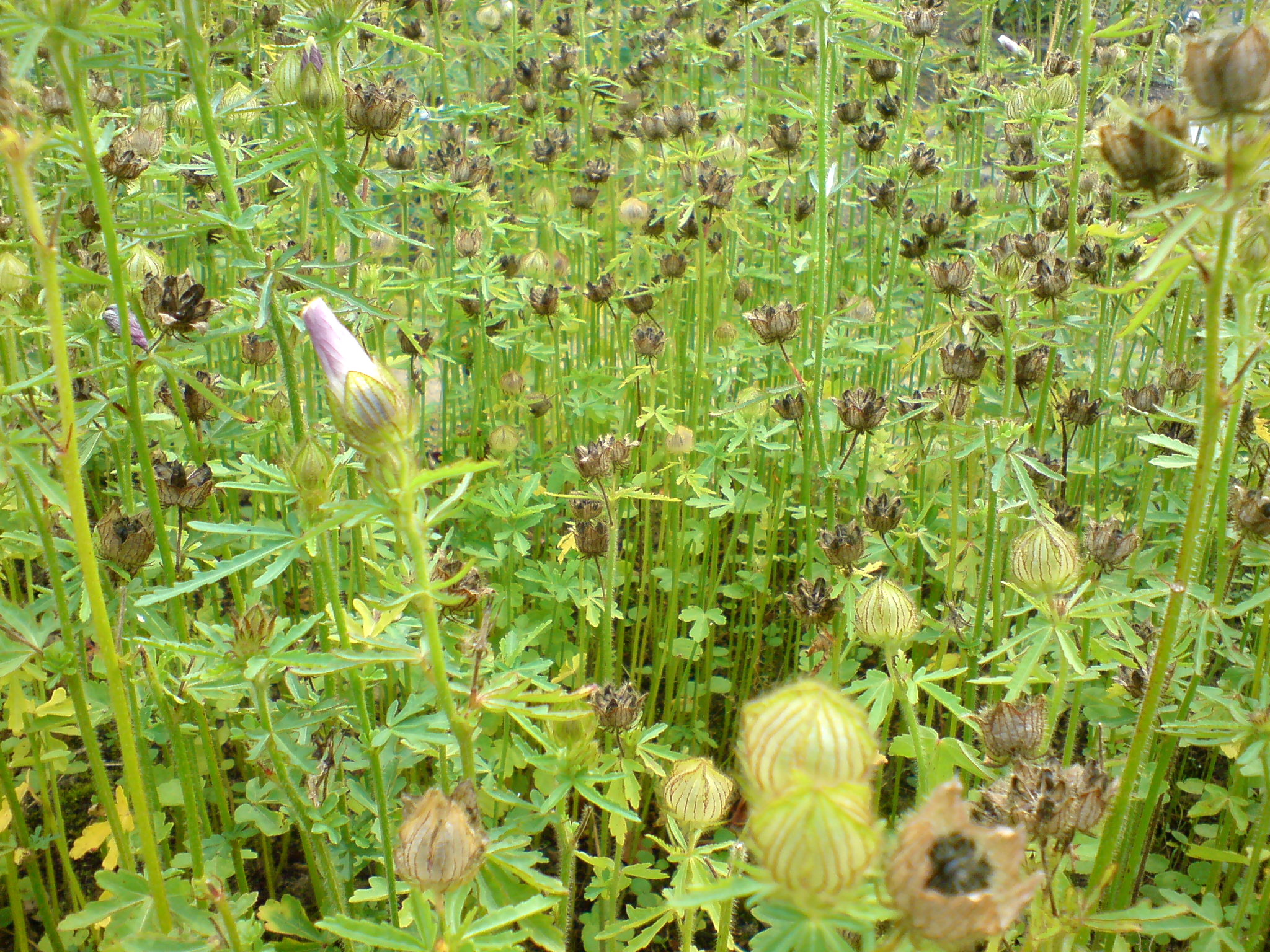
Hibiscus cannabinus in the Botanical Garden, Bremen

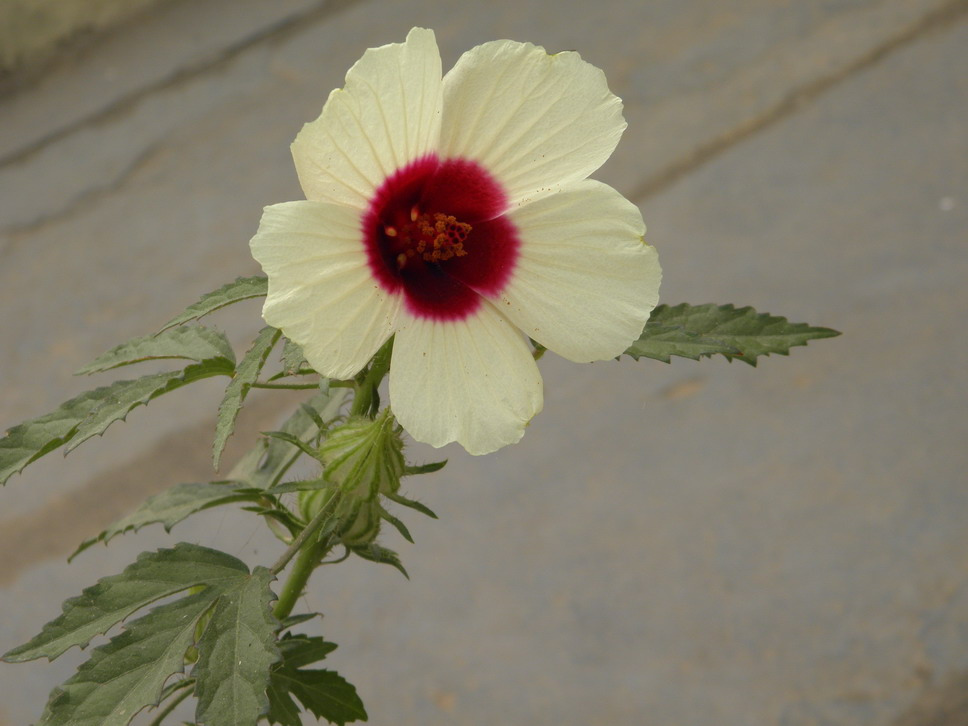
A Hibiscus cannabinus open blossom

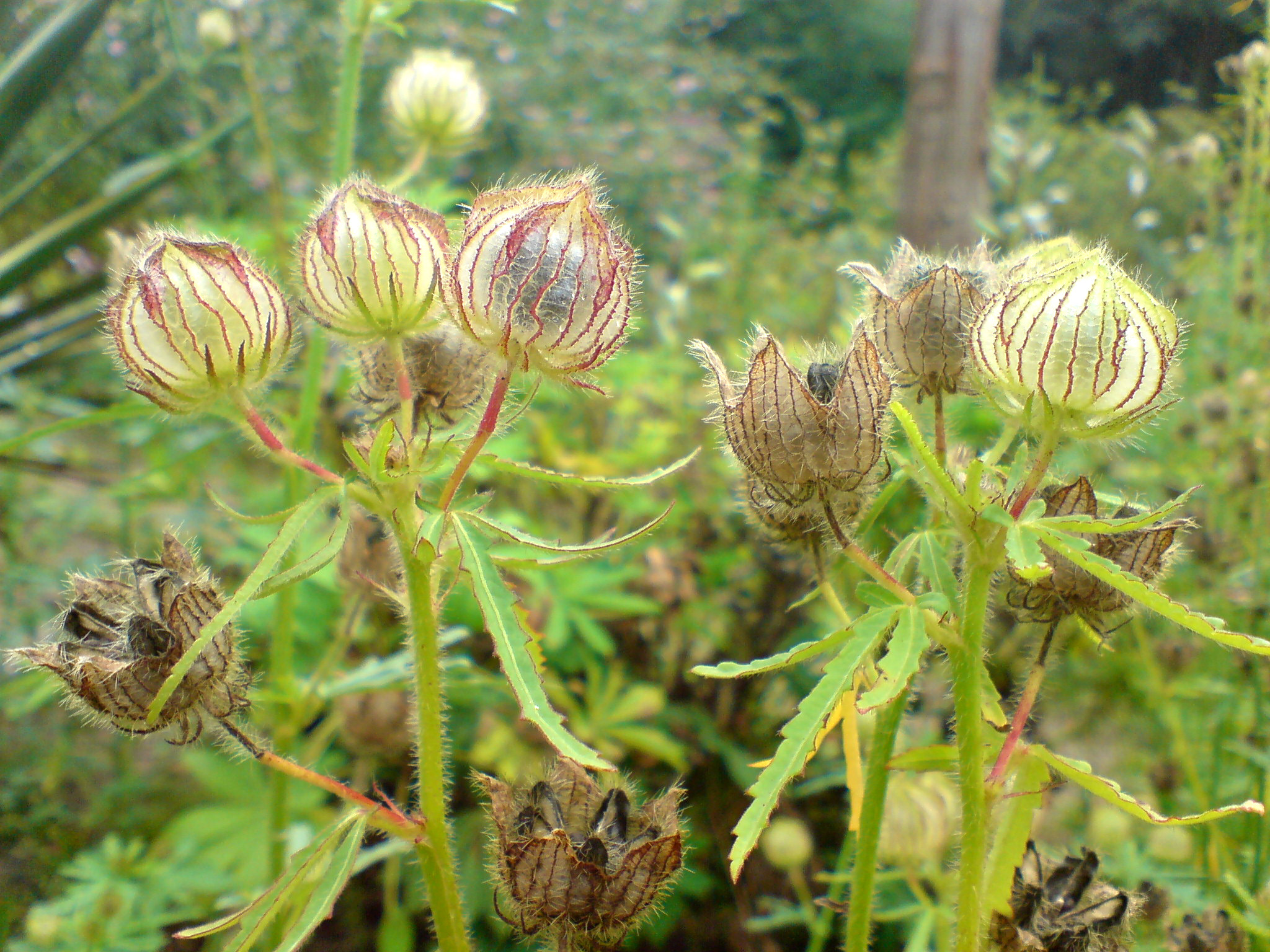
Hibiscus cannabinus in early bloom

Ambadi seed oil is extracted from seeds of the ambadi plant (Hibiscus cannabinus). It is an annual or perennial plant in the family Malvaceae and related to the roselle (Hibiscus sabdariffa). It is believed to be native to Africa (India to China) or Tropical Asia.

== Cultivation ==
In India, the tender leaves of the plant are used in the making of curries, but the plant is cultivated mainly as a fibre crop in drier regions. In order to cultivate the plant properly, moisture is required during the growing period, so rainfall should be at least 100 mm or more per month during the crop cycle, with a fairly uniform temperature.

The plant is hermaphroditic. It produces large, cream-coloured flowers characterised by a reddish purple or scarlet throat. These flowers are short-lived, opening in the early hours of morning before sunrise and closing by noon of the same day. While cannabinus is generally self-pollinating, bees and other insects cause a small amount of cross-pollination. In India the plant is cultivated in the states of Andhra Pradesh, West Bengal, Bihar, Maharashtra, Karnataka, and Orissa.

So far, ambadi has been cultivated only as a fibre crop that can be used for pulp and in other industries. The seed yield is 350–450 kg per hectare, and the seeds contain between 18 and 22% protein. The annual potential yield for ambadi in India is around 75,000 tonnes of seeds and around 13,000 tonnes of oil.

== Oil extraction ==
Ambadi seeds are greyish or dull green in appearance, while H. sabdiriffa plant seeds are brown or pink. Ambadi seeds are tetrahedral in shape and contain 18-22% oil. They have good storage stability, and their strongly adherent seed coat makes separation from the kernel difficult. The yield of oil from seeds is about 15%. To extract the oil, the seed is flaked, steamed and pressed. Residual oil in the cake can be extracted with hexane; alternatively all the oil can be extracted directly with the solvent.

== Properties and composition ==
Total phospholipids range from 3.9 to 10.3% of the oil, with a mean of 6.0%. Mean sterol percent is 0.9 and ranges from 0.6% of the total oil for 178-18RS-10 accession to 1.2% for Everglades 71. Palmitic (20.1% of the total fatty acids), oleic (29.2%), and linoleic (45.9%) are the major fatty acids, and palmitoleic (1.6%), linolenic (0.7%), and stearic (3.5%) acids are the minor components. Medium (C12–C14) and long (C22–C24) chain fatty acids are less than 1%. Sphingomyelin (4.42% of the total phospholipids), phosphatidyl ethanolamine (12.8%), phosphatidyl choline (21.9%), phosphatidyl serine (2.9%), phosphatidyl inositol (2.7%), lysophosphatidyl choline (5.3%), phosphatidyl glycerol (8.9%), phosphatidic acid (4.9%), and cardiolipin (3.6%) were identified in the nine genotypes. Phosphatidyl choline, phosphatidyl ethanolamine, and phosphatidyl glycerol are the dominant phospholipids. In addition, eight unidentified phospholipids were also found, β-sitosterol (72.3% of the total sterols), campesterol (9.9%), and stigmasterol (6.07%) being prevalent among the kenaf genotypes. Kenaf's relatively high oil content and its similarity to cottonseed oil suggest that the seed oil may be used as a source of edible oil. The variation among genotypes indicates potential for genetic improvement in oil yield and quality.

Physical and chemical properties of ambadi oil

property	range
Refractive index at 40 °C	1.465–1.471
Saponification value	189–195
Iodine value	93–107
Acid value	< 6.0
Unsaponifiable matter	< 2.5% by mass
Moisture and impurities	0.25

Fatty acid composition of ambadi oil

Fatty acid	percentage
Palmitic acid (C16:0)	20–35
Stearic acid (C18:0)	2.0–4.0
Oleic acid (C18:1)	25–34
Linoleic acid (C18:2)	15–47
(12,13)-epoxy acid (C18:1)	3.3–4.5
Cyclopropenoic2 acid (C19:1)	1.2–2.9
Cyclopropenoic3 acid (C19:1)	2.3–3.4

== Uses ==
- Ambadi seed oil can be used as biodiesel.
- Its similarity to cottonseed oil suggests that it may be an edible oil. The variation among genotypes indicates potential for genetic improvement in oil yield and quality.
- The oil is suitable for use as a lubricant, lamp oil, in the manufacturing of soap, linoleum flooring, and in paints and varnishes.
- The green leaves are common in Indian food and used similar to other leaves in curries.

== See also ==
- Kenaf
- Roselle (plant)

== Bibliography ==
- Mahadevan, N; Shivali; Kamboj, Pradeep (February 2009). "Hibiscus sabdariffa Linn.–An overview". Natural Product Radiance. 8 (1): 77–83. hdl:123456789/3769.
- Mohammad, Ali; Harbans, Bhardwaj; Anwar Hamama; C. Webber Ill. (1 October 1995). "Chemical Composition of Kenaf (Hibiscus Cannabinus L.) Seed Oil". Industrial Crops and Products. 4 (3): 157–165. doi:10.1016/0926-6690(95)00027-A.
- Jindal, S.; and K. Goyal (2012). "Evaluation of Performance and Emissions of Hibiscus Cannabinus (Ambadi) Seed Oil Biodiesel". Clean Technologies and Environmental Policy. 14 (4): 633–639. Bibcode:2012CTEP...14..633J. doi:10.1007/s10098-011-0426-5. S2CID 97017354.
- Bukenya-Ziraba, R. "Hibiscus Cannabinus L. Prota 2: Vegetables/Légumes Record Display 10.2 (2004)". prota.org. Archived from the original on December 13, 2013.
