= Baling twine =

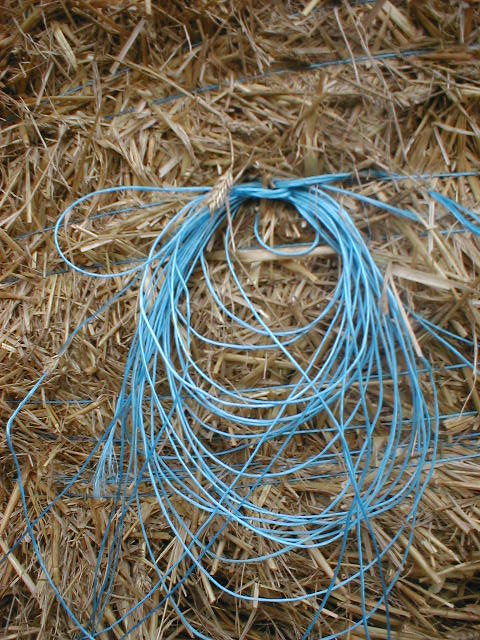
Synthetic baling twine tied around bales of hay

Baling twine or baler twine is a small diameter sisal or synthetic twine used to bind a quantity of fibrous material (notably hay or straw) into a more compact and easily stacked form.

Tensile strengths of single-ply baling twine range from 95 psi (0.66 MPa) to 325 psi (2.24 MPa).

Traditional sisal baler twine is naturally biodegradable.
