= Sisal production in Tanzania =

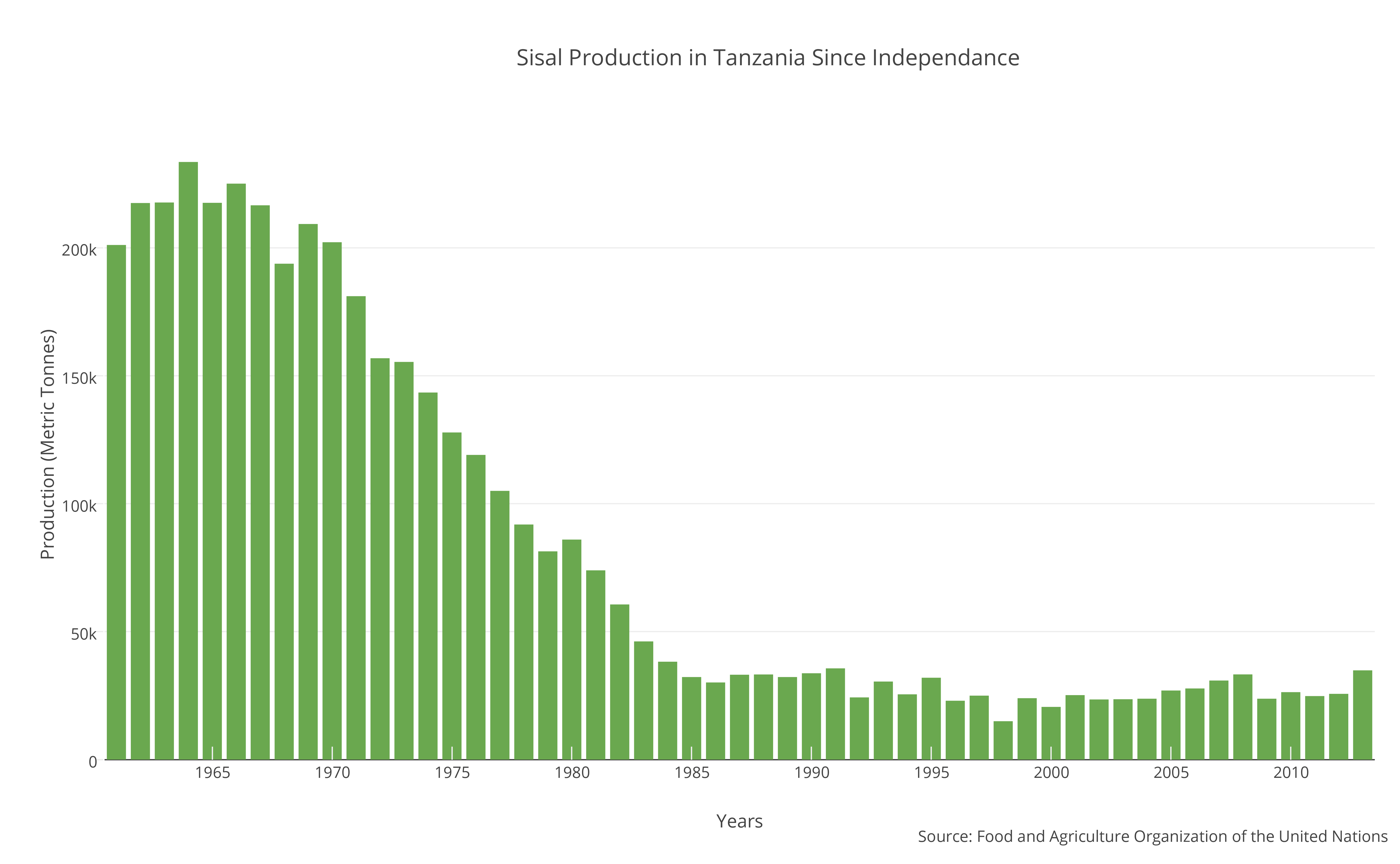
Sisal Production in Tanzania 1961-2013

Sisal production in Tanzania began in the late 19th century by the German East Africa Company. Sisal was continually produced during the German administration and the British administration and was the colony's largest export highly prized for use in cordage and carpets worldwide. At the time of independence in 1961, Tanzania was the largest exporter of Sisal in the world and the industry employed over 1 million farmers and factory workers.

Sisal production began to decline after independence due to the drop in world prices as synthetic nylon substitutes became more popular. The nationalization of the estates during Ujamaa and the mismanagement of the estates further dropped the production in the country. However, in recent years the government has injected funds to help revive the industry's glory.

== History ==
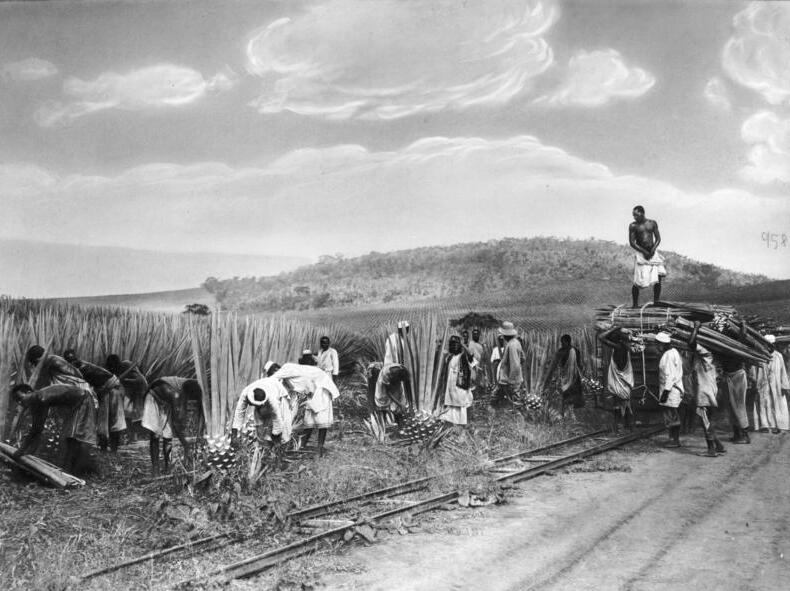
Sisal Plantation in German East Africa 1906

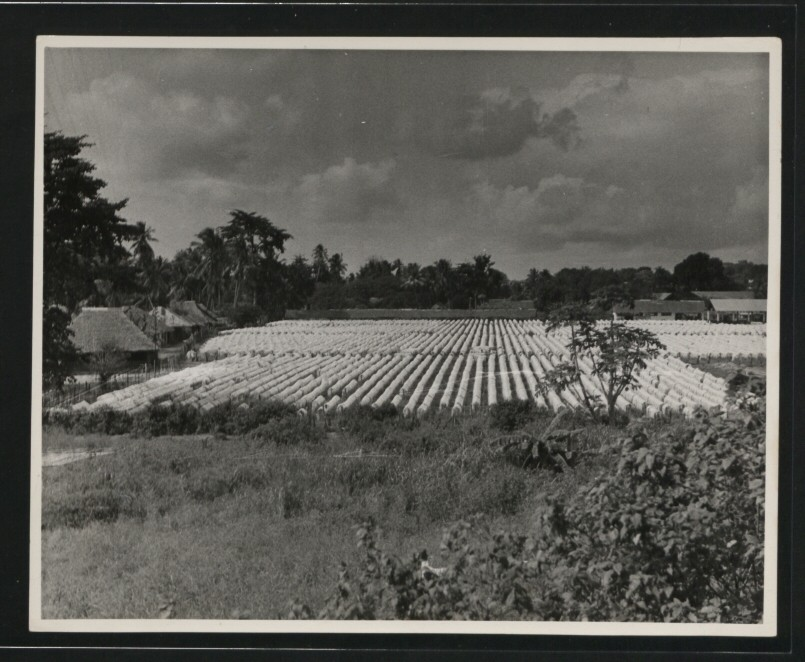
Sisal laid out to dry in British Tanganyika

Sisal is the oldest commercial cash crop still in survival in Tanzania. In 1893, visionary German Agronomist Dr. Richard Hindorf introduced the crop into the colony. The plant Agave sisalana was smuggled into Tanganyika from Yucatán, Mexico in the belly of a stuffed crocodile. Only 66 plants had survived the journey but it was commercially viable to start the industry. The country's warm and semi arid climate was perfect for the plant and production in the colony grew exponentially. The plants fibers were mainly used for the production of ropes for the German naval fleet and sacks to export other agriculture products from the colony. This success story began to grab the attention of the other European powers expanding their navies and the industry expanded to the neighboring colonies of modern-day Kenya, Mozambique and Angola.

Post World War I the British scored control of Tanganyika and continued to develop the industry. The colonial government continued to allocate more land for Sisal production which attracted Ex-British officers living in Kenya and many German settlers to continue farming along the country's northern border along the Arusha-Tanga road. At independence in 1961, Tanganyika was the world leader in Sisal production and over 200,000 tonnes of sisal was produced annual employing over 1 million workers in the industry. The crop was the country's highest foreign exchange earner and was referred to as Tanzania's 'green gold'.

Sisal production in the country peaked in 1964 with around 250,000 tonnes in production from regions from all over the country such as Tanga, Morogoro, Arusha, Mwanza and Shinyanga. In 1967 following the Arusha Declaration most of the sisal estates were nationalized by the government. This began the downfall of the sisal industry as bureaucracy, over-centralization and lack of experience caused the production to fall rapidly. Furthermore, with the increasing popularity of Synthetic Nylon fibers, drove the world price for sisal down resulting in the foreclosure of many sisal factories. By the end of Ujamaa and President Nyerere's rule, sisal production had fallen from 235,000 tonnes in 1964 to 32,000 in 1985, less than 15% of the country's peak.

With the changing economic landscape in Tanzania, the government of Tanzania passed the Sisal Industry Act, 1997; which allowed privatization of the government owned factories and established the Tanzania Sisal Board. Sisal production since has been stable, however there are no recent breakthroughs in production. Tanzania currently sits as the second largest producer of Sisal in the world after Brazil and the government plans to revive the industry to help facilitate the nations former glory.

== Sisal products ==
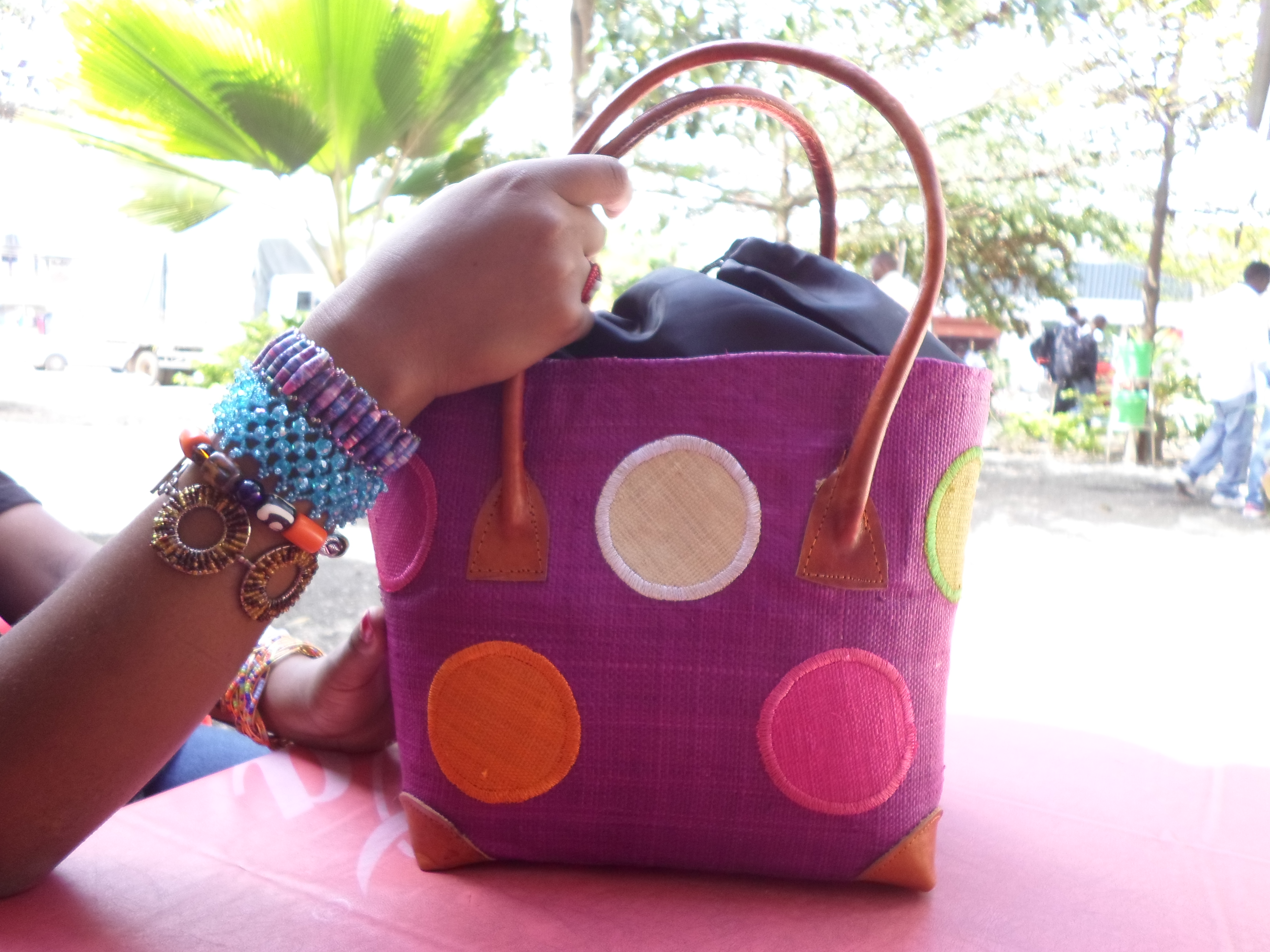
African sisal bag

The Sisal plant is used to produce a sisal line fiber. Historically this fiber has been used to produce threads and ropes for ships. Domestically the fibers are used to make various consumer handicraft products such as;

1. Carpets
2. Bags
3. Sacks
4. Low density cords.

=== Energy production ===
With the production of sisal only 2-5% of the plant is utilized. The remaining bio material is used as fertilizer or thrown away. In Tanzania, the Katani Limited constructed the country's first Sisal waste bio gas power plant at Hale. The project helps provide energy for rural establishments and the government plans to encourage the practice to help increase the country's energy output and reduce foreign exchange losses from the purchase of fossil fuels. Currently, the plant produces 1 MW of electricity and organic fertilizers which help reduce the company's costs. The Katani limited plans to build 5 more of the plants in a joint venture with a Chinese company at their various estates.

== Notable companies ==
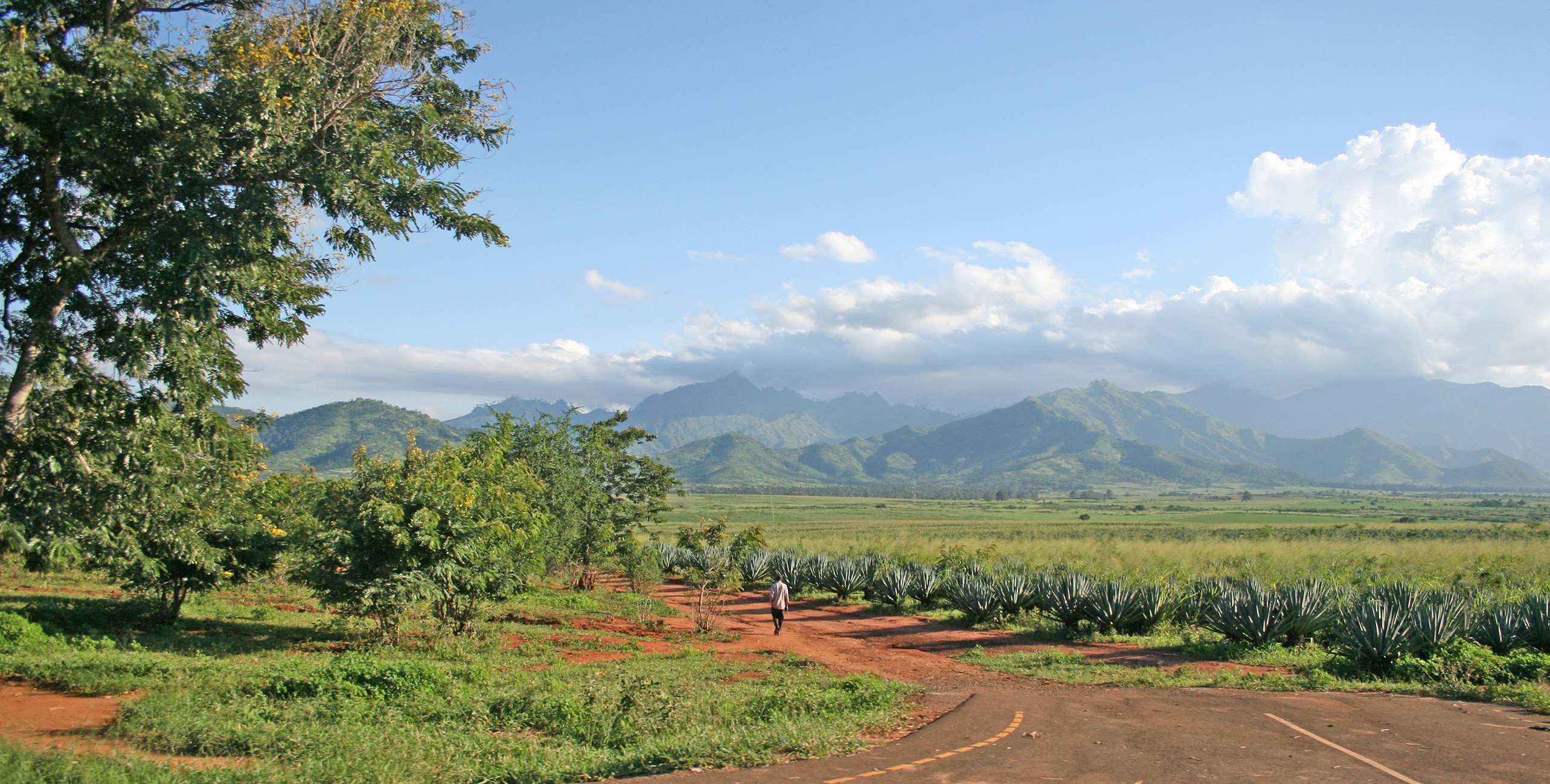
Sisal Plantations in Mt. Uluguru Tanzania

1. Amboni Plantations Limited
2. Katani Limited
3. L.M Investments Limited
4. Mohamed Enterprises Limited (MeTL)
5. Sfi Tanzania
6. Agrihai Company Ltd

== See also ==
- Sisal global production and trade patterns
- Coffee production in Tanzania
- Cashew production in Tanzania
