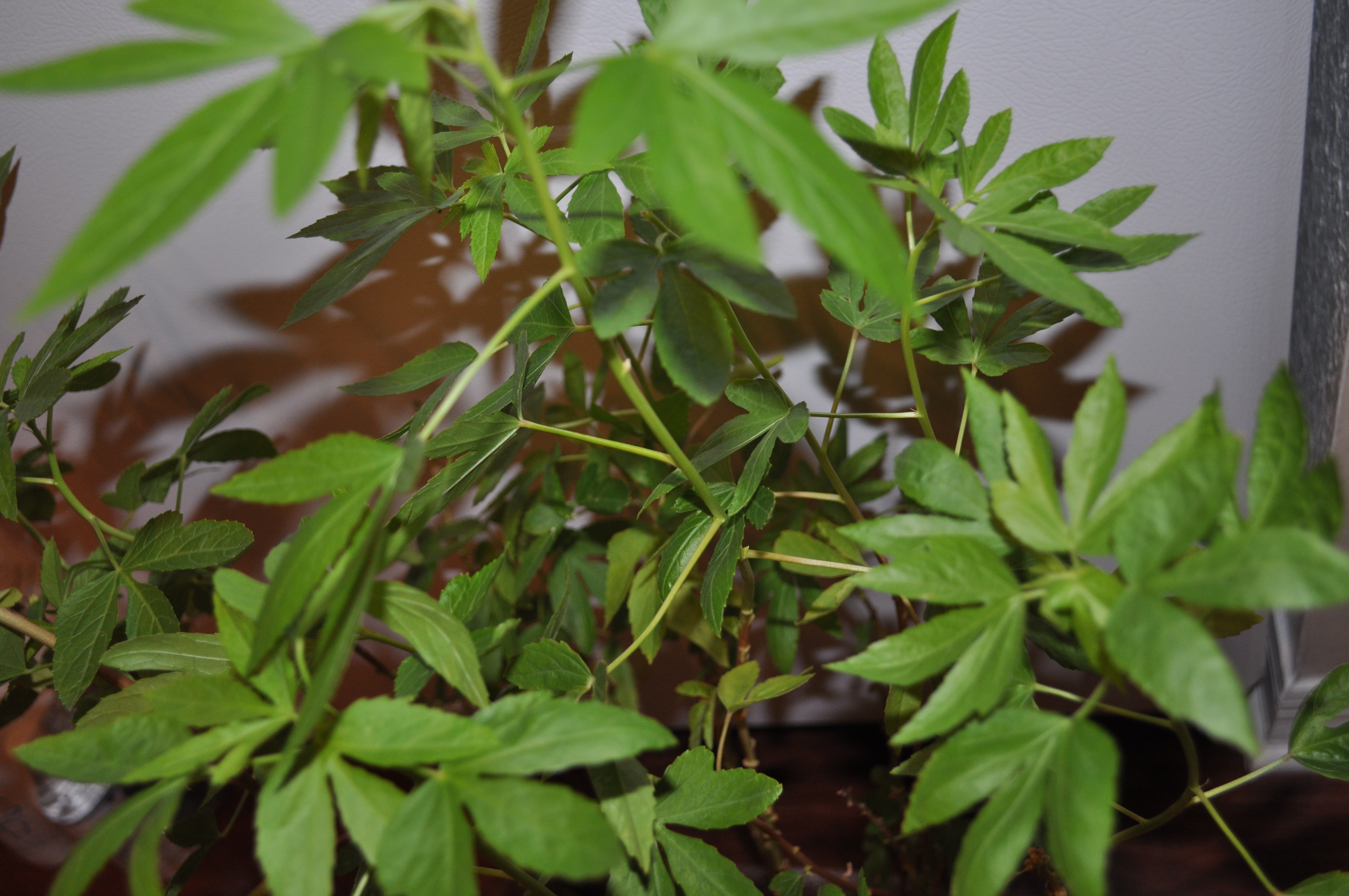

Scientific classification
- Kingdom: Plantae
- Clade: Tracheophytes
- Clade: Angiosperms
- Clade: Eudicots
- Clade: Rosids
- Order: Malvales
- Family: Malvaceae
- Genus: Hibiscus
- Species: H. cannabinus

Binomial name
- Hibiscus cannabinus L.

Synonyms
- List: Abelmoschus congener (Schumach. & Thonn.) Walp.; Abelmoschus verrucosus (Guill. & Perr.) Walp.; Furcaria cannabina Ulbr.; Furcaria cavanillesii Kostel.; Hibiscus asper Hook.f.; Hibiscus cannabinus var. chevalieri Hochr.; Hibiscus cannabinus var. punctatus (A.Rich.) Hochr.; Hibiscus cannabinus var. simplex A.Howard & G.Howard; Hibiscus cannabinus var. tripartitus (Forssk.) Chiov.; Hibiscus cannabinus var. viridis A.Howard & G.Howard; Hibiscus congener Schumach. & Thonn.; Hibiscus cordofanus Turcz.; Hibiscus henriquesii Pires de Lima; Hibiscus malangensis Baker f.; Hibiscus obtusatus Schumach.; Hibiscus sabdariffa subsp. cannabinus (L.) Panigrahi & Murti; Hibiscus tripartitus Forssk.; Hibiscus vanderystii De Wild.; Hibiscus verrucosus Guill. & Perr.; Hibiscus verrucosus var. punctatus A.Rich.; Hibiscus vitifolius Mill.; Hibiscus wightianus Wall.; Ketmia glandulosa Moench

= Kenaf =

Species of flowering plant

Kenaf [etymology: Persian], Hibiscus cannabinus, is a plant in the family Malvaceae also called Deccan hemp and Java jute. Hibiscus cannabinus is in the genus Hibiscus and is native to Africa, although its exact origin is unknown. The name also applies to the fibre obtained from this plant, similar to jute.

== Common names ==
Common names in various languages may number in the hundreds, with names in English including Deccan hemp, Java jute, and wild stockrose. In West Africa, it is called dah, gambo and rama.

== Characteristics ==
It is an annual, biennial, or a short-lived perennial herbaceous plant, growing to 1.5–3.5 m (4.9–11.5 ft) tall with a woody base. The stems are 1–2 cm (0.4–0.8 in) diameter, often but not always branched. The leaves are 10–15 cm (4–6 in) long and variable in shape; leaves near the base of the stems are deeply lobed (3 to 7 lobes) and leaves near the top of the stem are shallowly lobed or unlobed lanceolate. The flowers are 8–15 cm (3–6 in) in diameter. The flower base color can be white, yellow, or purple, and the white and yellow flowers are dark purple in the center. The fruit is a capsule 2 cm (0.8 in) in diameter and contains several seeds.

=== Fibre ===
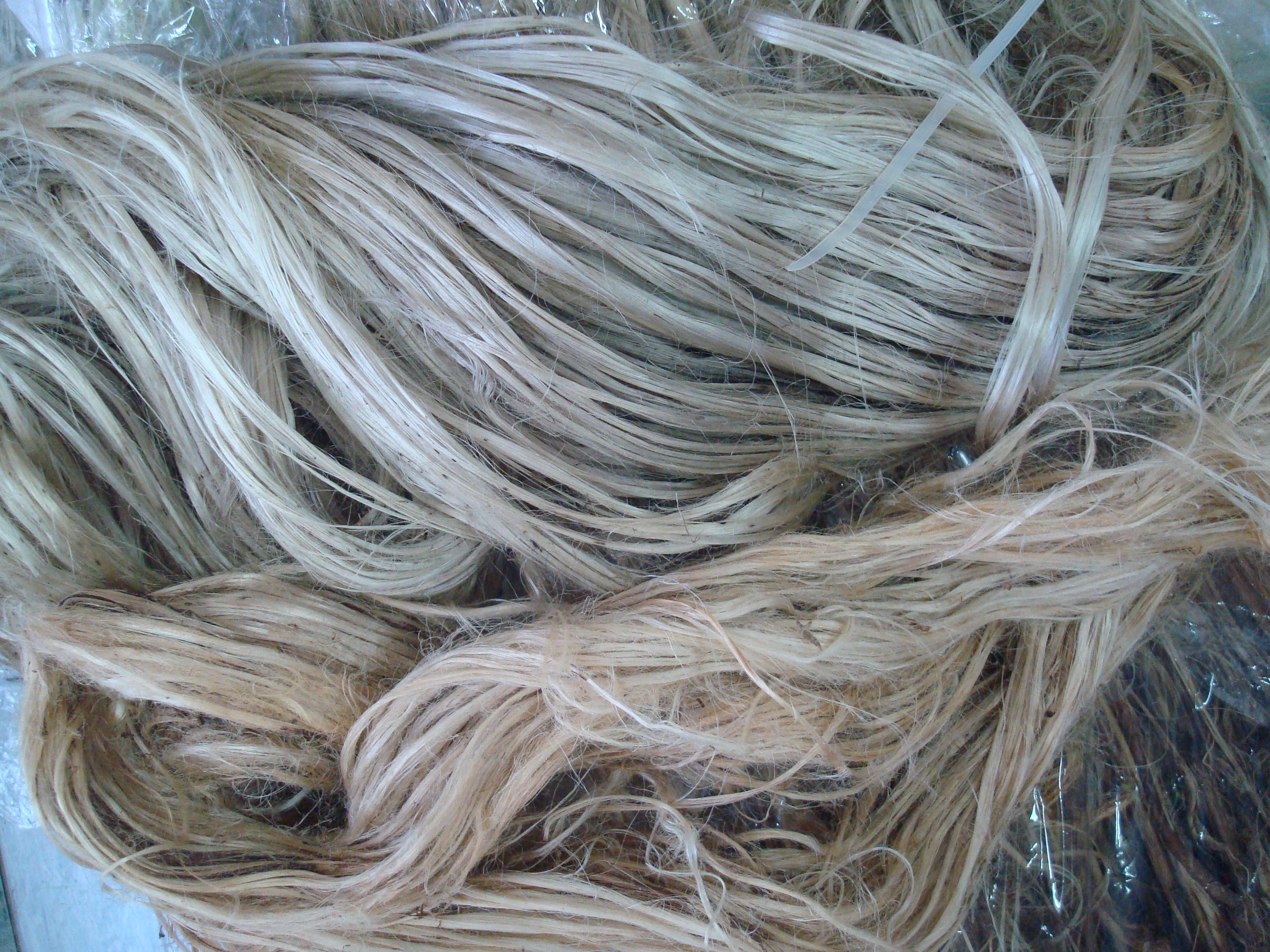
Kenaf long fibre from the bast

The fibres in kenaf are found in the bast (bark) and core (wood). The bast constitutes 40% of the plant. "Crude fibre" separated from the bast is multi-cellular, consisting of several individual cells stuck together. The individual fibre cells are about 2–6 mm long and slender. The cell wall is thick (6.3 μm). The core is about 60% of the plant and has fibre cells that are thick (≈38 μm) but short (0.5 mm) and thin-walled (3 μm). Paper pulp can be produced using the whole stem, and therefore contains both bast and core fibres. The pulp quality is similar to that of hardwood.

== Uses ==
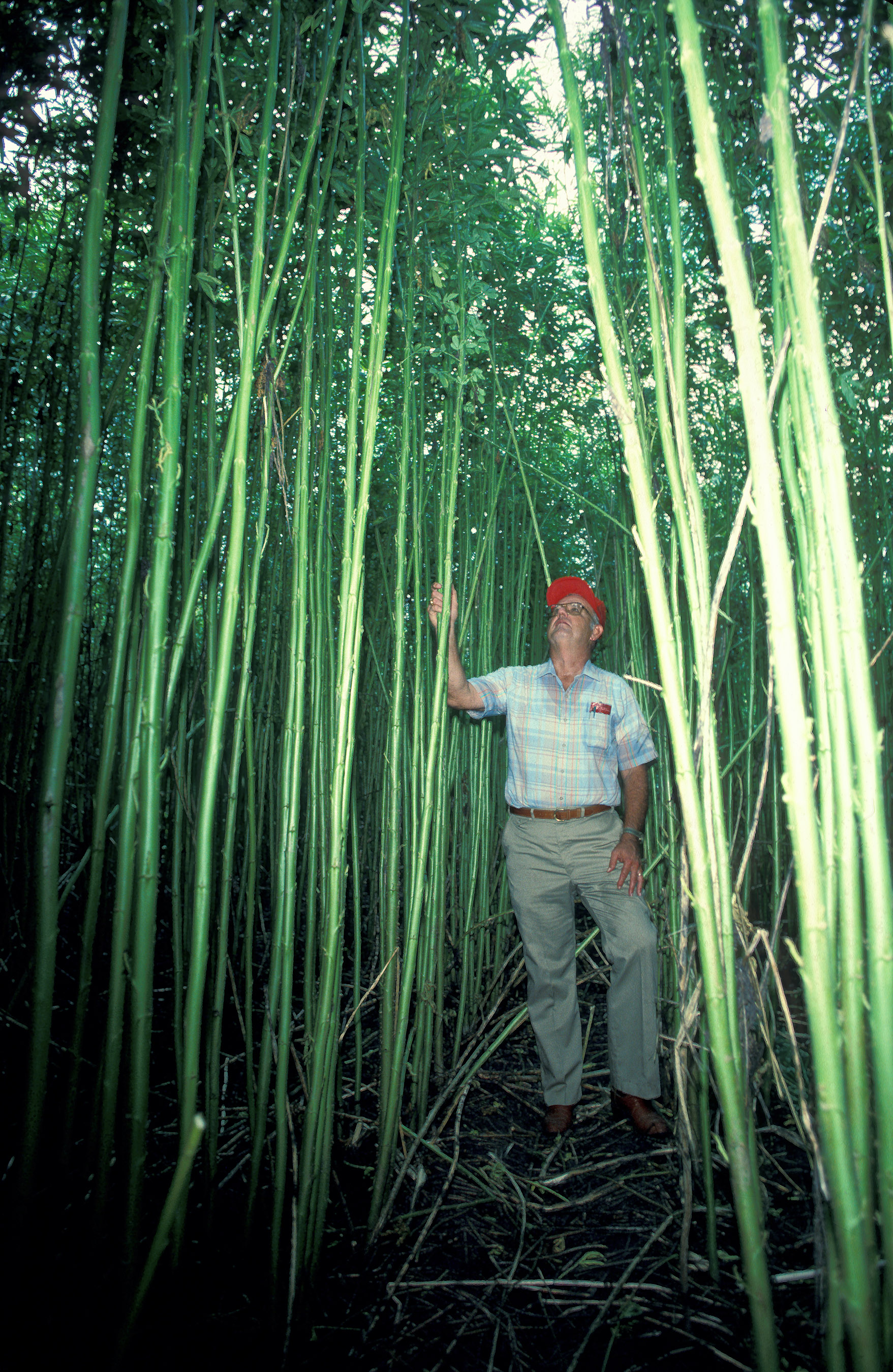
Kenaf

Kenaf is cultivated for its fibre in India, Bangladesh, United States, Indonesia, Malaysia, South Africa, Vietnam, Thailand, and parts of Africa. The stems produce two types of fibre: a coarser fibre in the outer layer (bast fibre), and a finer fibre in the core. The bast fibres are used to make ropes. Kenaf matures in 100 to 200 days. First grown in Egypt over 3000 years ago, the leaves of the kenaf plant were a component of both human and animal diets, while the bast fibre was used for bags, cordage, and the sails for Egyptian boats. This crop was not introduced into southern Europe until the early 1900s. Today, while the principal farming areas are China and India, Kenaf is also grown in countries including the US, Mexico, and Senegal.

The main uses of kenaf fibre have been rope, twine, coarse cloth (similar to that made from jute), and paper. Other uses include engineered wood; insulation; clothing-grade cloth; soil-less potting mixes; animal bedding; packing material; and material that absorbs oil and liquids. It is also useful as cut bast fibre for blending with resins in the making of plastic composites, as a drilling fluid loss-preventive for oil drilling muds, and for a seeded hydromulch for erosion control. Kenaf can be made into various types of environmental mats, such as seeded grass mats for instant lawns and moldable mats for manufactured parts and containers. Panasonic has set up a plant in Malaysia to manufacture kenaf fibre boards and export them to Japan.

=== Kenaf seed oil ===
Kenaf seeds yield an edible vegetable oil, and is also used for cosmetics, industrial lubricants and biofuel production. Kenaf oil is high in omega polyunsaturated fatty acids, containing a high percentage of linoleic acid, followed by oleic acid. Alpha-linolenic acid is present in 2-4% content.

Fatty acid composition:

- palmitic acid: 19%
- oleic acid: 28%
- linoleic acid: 45%
- stearic acid: 3%
- alpha-linolenic acid: 3%

=== Kenaf paper ===
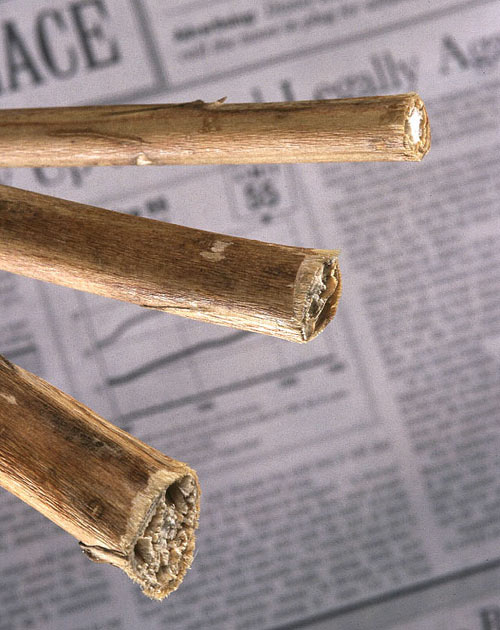
Dried kenaf stems

The most common process to make kenaf paper is using soda pulping before processing the obtained pulp in a paper machine.

The use of kenaf in paper production offers various environmental advantages over producing paper from trees. In 1960, the USDA surveyed more than 500 plants and selected kenaf as the most promising source of tree-free newsprint. In 1970, kenaf newsprint produced in the International Paper Company's mill in Pine Bluff, Arkansas, was successfully used by six U.S. newspapers. Printing and writing paper made from the fibrous kenaf plant has been offered in the United States since 1992. Again in 1987, a Canadian mill produced 13 rolls of kenaf newsprint which were used by four U.S. newspapers to print experimental issues. They found that kenaf newsprint made for stronger, brighter and cleaner pages than standard pine paper with less detriment to the environment. Due partly to kenaf fibres being naturally whiter than tree pulp, less bleaching is required to create a brighter sheet of paper. Hydrogen peroxide, an environmentally-safe bleaching agent that does not create dioxin, has been used with much success in the bleaching of kenaf.

Various reports suggest that the energy requirements for producing pulp from kenaf are about 20 percent less than those for wood pulp, mostly due to the lower lignin content of kenaf. Many of the facilities that now process Southern pine for paper use can be converted to accommodate kenaf.

An area of 1-acre (4,000 m^{2}) of kenaf produces 5 to 8 tons of raw plant bast and core fibre in a single growing season. In contrast, 1-acre (4,000 m^{2}) of forest (in the US) produces approximately 1.5 to 3.5 tons of usable fibre per year. It is estimated that growing kenaf on 5,000 acres (20 km^{2}) can produce enough pulp to supply a paper plant having a capacity of 200 tons per day. Over 20 years, 1-acre (4,000 m^{2}) of farmland can produce 10 to 20 times the amount of fiber that 1-acre (4,000 m^{2}) of Southern pine can produce.

David Brower, former Executive Director of the Sierra Club, in chapter 8 of his semi-autobiographical environmental book Let the Mountains Talk, Let the Rivers Run: A Call to Save the Earth, titled "Forest Revolution", advocated for kenaf paper use and explained its many advantages over wood pulp. The first edition of the book was printed on kenaf paper.

== See also ==
- International Jute Study Group
- Ambadi seed oil
