= Leaf fiber =

Plant fiber mainly used for producing rope

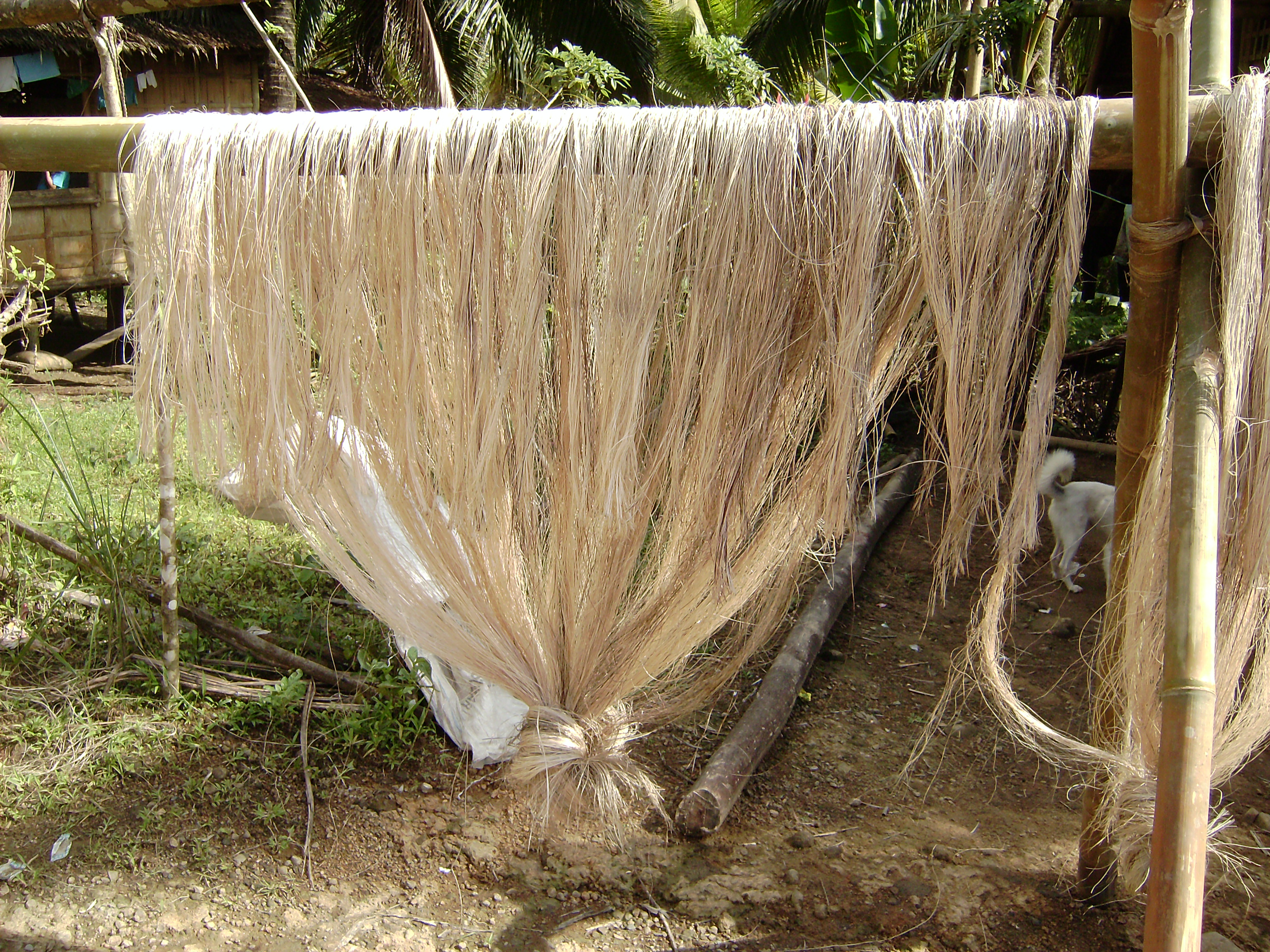
Abaca that has been stripped down to just the fibrous material

Leaf fibers or hard fibers are a type of plant fiber mainly used for cordage (producing rope). They are the toughest of the plant fibers which is most likely due to their increased lignin content when compared to the other groups of plant fibers. They are typically characterized as being very tough and rigid lending them towards being used in rope production over clothing or paper like other plant fibers.

Leaf fibers can be found in the vascular bundles of plant leaves and therefore consist of both phloem and xylem tissues and any other vascular sheathing tissues (for example sclerenchyma cells). More specifically, leaf fibers are typically found in monocotyledonous leaves.

== Processing ==
The fibers are harvested from plants in long, thin bundles mainly through the process of decortication which is where the non-fibrous tissues are scraped away from the plant fibers by hand or in a machine. For the majority of cases, the leaves must be hand-picked from the plant at maturity before undergoing decortication which causes the harvesting of hard fibers to be a very energy and time intensive task.

== Manufacturing applications ==
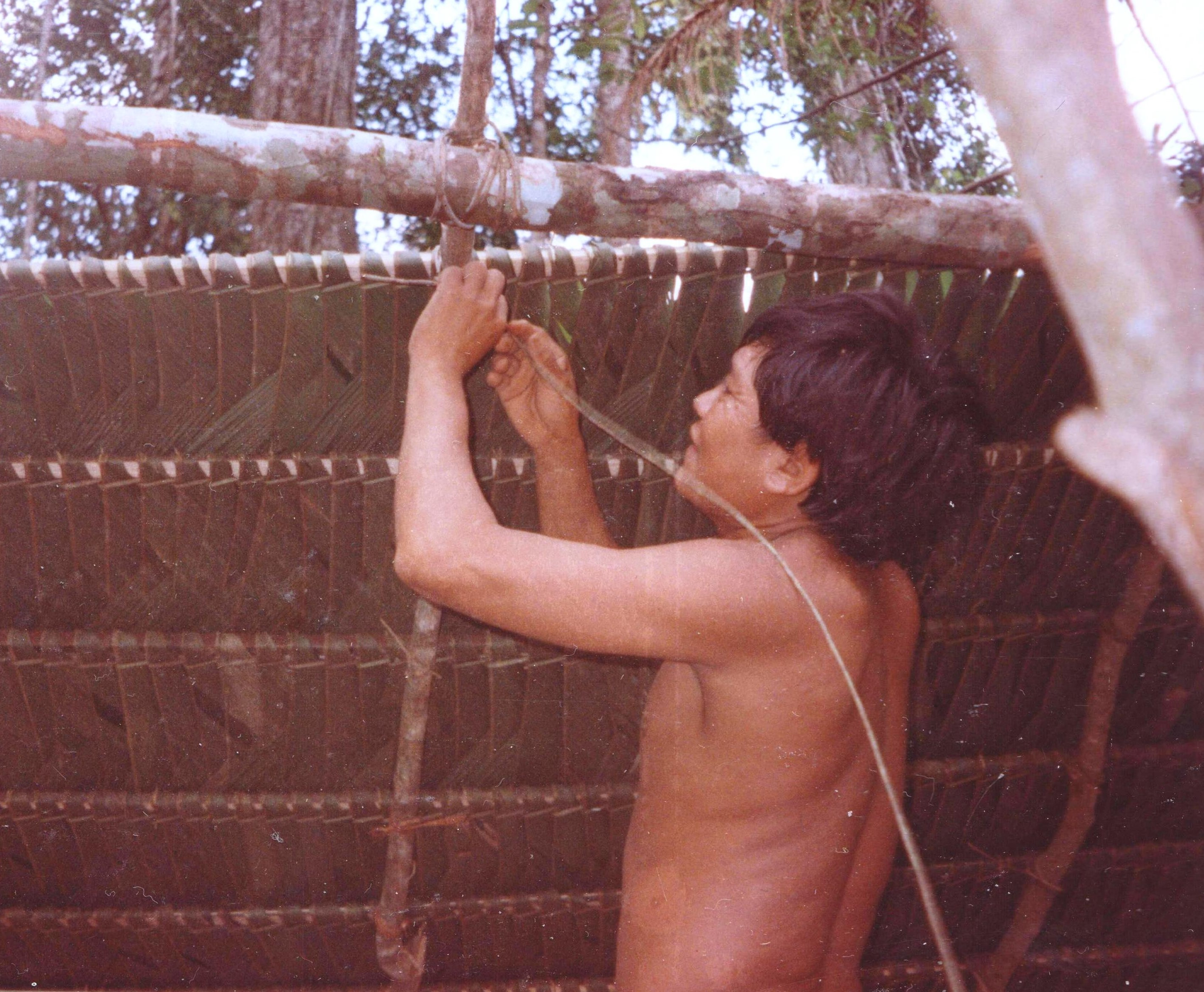
Yanomami man ties a knot with palm leaf fiber to repair the roof of a Shabono

Sisal and abaca are the primary leaf fibers that are harvested and sold. These are both mainly used to make rope or matting but, as technology continues to advance these, and other, hard fibers are being able to be broken down and pulped to be used in paper products.

Not much research is being looked into the possibilities and abilities of leaf fibers as they are very hard to harvest and process so synthetic fibers are more commonly used in their place.

Leaf fibers have been proposed for use in composite materials as a means of lowering carbon footprint.

== Common fibers ==
- Abaca (Manila Hemp) - cordage
- Piña - cloth
- Sisal - cordage, matting
- Cantala - woven fabrics
- Phormium - flax, cordage
