= Agave kewensis =

Conservation status
- Endangered (IUCN 3.1)

Scientific classification
- Kingdom: Plantae
- Clade: Tracheophytes
- Clade: Angiosperms
- Clade: Monocots
- Order: Asparagales
- Family: Asparagaceae
- Subfamily: Agavoideae
- Genus: Agave
- Species: A. kewensis

Binomial name
- Agave kewensis Jacobi

Synonyms
- Agave grijalvensis B.Ullrich

Species of flowering plant

Agave kewensis, commonly known as Grijalva's agave, is a species of agave plant in the family Asparagaceae. It was described by Georg Albano von Jacobi (Prussian botanist) in 1866.

== Description ==
Agave kewensis on average reaches 7–10 feet (2.1–3.0 m) tall, but this may differ on occasion. Leaves are around 1 foot (0.30 m) long with smaller-sized spines. The species produces yellow blooms throughout late summer and early autumn, with some flowers becoming 2–3 inches (51–76 mm) wide.

== Distribution and habitat ==
Agave kewensis is endemic to Chiapas and Oaxaca, Mexico, where it thrives in arid montane zones. Specifically, the species range resides near the two towns, Sierra de Juárez and Sierra de Nacajuca in Oaxaca, and Sierra del Aguila y San Pablo in Chiapas. Its known populations grow within humid ravines and canyons, at average elevations of 300–3,000 metres (980–9,840 ft). It primarily enjoys rocky outcrops and decomposed limestone substrate. The species is seen growing near abundant moss cover, which has water droplet buildup when its rains, but also keeps the plant somewhat cool during hot seasons.

== Classification and conservation ==
Agave kewensis was originally assigned under Agave grijalvensis, but was later assigned to its own taxon, for the two species of agave were generally different. Some botanists still dispute the classification of this species, for they believe it is a misclassification and is a synonym of Agave grijalvensis.

Agave kewensis is currently listed as "Endangered" by the IUCN Red List, for the species range is only 7.7 square miles (20 km^{2}), with threats of deforestation, wildfires, and overexploitation from humans becoming more serious by the year. The endemicity and rarity of the species earns the agave plant a title for one of Mexico's most endangered plants.

== Uses ==
Agave kewensis is commonly used as an ornamental plant for gardens, private collections, and botanical parks, but is being overcollected from its natural habitat in the wild, hence creating a population decline. Other uses may include: brush for fires, medicinal purposes, and used for local cuisine (although the species petals and other plant matter can be toxic in great amounts).
