= List of state schools in Scotland (city council areas) =

The following is a partial list of articles for state schools in the unitary council areas of Aberdeen City, Dundee City, City of Edinburgh and Glasgow City in Scotland, United Kingdom.

You may also find Category:Schools in Scotland of use to find a particular school. See also the List of the oldest schools in the United Kingdom.

By unitary council area.

Note that the allocations to address and council area may not be accurate in every case and you can help if you have access to local directories.

== Aberdeen City council area ==
see also List of schools in Aberdeen

=== Primary schools ===
- Abbotswell School
- Airyhall School
- Ashley Road School
- Braehead School
- Bramble Brae School
- Brimmond School
- Broomhill School
- Charleston School
- Cornhill School
- Culter School
- Cults School
- Danestone School
- Dyce School
- Fernielea School
- Ferryhill School
- Forehill School
- Gilcomstoun School
- Glashieburn School
- Greenbrae School
- Greyhope School
- Hanover Street School
- Hazlehead School
- Heathryburn School
- Holy Family RC School
- Kaimhill School
- Kingsford School
- Kingswells School
- Kirkhill School
- Kittybrewster School
- Loirston School
- Manor Park School
- Middleton Park School
- Mile-End School
- Milltimber School
- Muirfield School
- Quarryhill School
- Riverbank School
- Scotstown School
- Seaton School
- Skene Square School
- St Joseph's R.C. School
- St Peter's RC School
- Stoneywood School
- Sunnybank School
- Tullos School
- Westpark School
- Woodside School

=== Secondary schools ===
- Aberdeen Grammar School
- Bridge of Don Academy
- Bucksburn Academy
- Cults Academy
- Dyce Academy
- Harlaw Academy
- Hazlehead Academy
- Lochside Academy
- Northfield Academy
- Oldmachar Academy
- St Machar Academy

== Dundee City council area ==
see also List of schools in Dundee

=== Primary schools ===
- Ancrum Road Primary School
- Ardler Primary School
- Ballumbie Primary School
- Barnhill Primary School
- Blackness Primary School
- Camperdown Primary School
- Claypotts Castle Primary School
- Clepington Primary School
- Craigiebarns Primary School
- Craigowl Primary School
- Dens Road Primary School
- Downfield Primary School
- Eastern Primary School
- Fintry Primary School
- Forthill Primary School
- Glebelands Primary School
- Longhaugh Primary School
- Mill of Mains Primary School
- Our Lady's RC Primary School
- Rosebank Primary School
- Rowantree Primary School
- Sidlaw View Primary School
- SS Peter & Paul RC Primary School
- St Andrew's RC Primary School
- St Clement's RC Primary School
- St Francis RC Primary School
- St Fergus' RC Primary School
- St Joseph's RC Primary School
- St Mary's RC Primary School
- St Ninian's RC Primary School
- St Pius RC Primary School
- Tayview Primary School
- Victoria Park Primary School

=== Secondary schools ===
- Baldragon Academy
- Braeview Academy
- Craigie High School
- Grove Academy
- Harris Academy
- Morgan Academy
- St John's Roman Catholic High School
- St Paul's Roman Catholic Academy

== City of Edinburgh council area ==
see also List of schools in Edinburgh

=== Primary schools ===
- Abbeyhill Primary School
- Balgreen Primary School
- Blackhall Primary School
- Bonaly Primary School
- Broomhouse Primary School
- Broughton Primary School
- Brunstane Primary School
- Bruntsfield Primary School
- Buckstone Primary School
- Canaan Lane Primary School
- Canal View Primary School
- Carrick Knowe Primary School
- Castleview Primary School
- Clermiston Primary School
- Clovenstone Primary School
- Colinton Primary School
- Corstorphine Primary School
- Craigentinny Primary School
- Craiglockhart Primary School
- Craigour Park Primary School
- Craigroyston Primary School
- Cramond Primary School
- Currie Primary School
- Dalmeny Primary School
- Dalry Primary School
- Davidson's Mains Primary School
- Dean Park Primary School
- Duddingston Primary School
- East Craigs Primary School
- Echline Primary School
- Ferryhill Primary School
- Flora Stevenson Primary School
- Forthview Primary School
- Fox Covert Primary School
- Frogston Primary School
- Gilmerton Primary School
- Gracemount Primary School
- Granton Primary School
- Gylemuir Primary School
- Hermitage Park Primary School
- Hillwood Primary School
- Holy Cross RC Primary School
- James Gillespie's Primary School
- Juniper Green Primary School
- Kirkliston Primary School
- Leith Primary School
- Leith Walk Primary School
- Liberton Primary School
- Longstone Primary School
- Lorne Primary School
- Murrayburn Primary School
- Nether Currie Primary School
- Newcraighall Primary School
- Niddrie Mill Primary School
- Oxgangs Primary School
- Parsons Green Primary School
- Pentland Primary School
- Pirniehall Primary School
- Preston Street Primary School
- Prestonfield Primary School
- Queensferry Primary School
- Ratho Primary School
- Roseburn Primary School
- Royal Mile Primary School
- Sciennes Primary School
- Sighthill Primary School
- South Morningside Primary School
- St Andrew's Fox Covert RC Primary School
- St Catherine's RC Primary School
- St Cuthbert's RC Primary School
- St David's RC Primary School
- St Francis' RC Primary School
- St John Vianney RC Primary School
- St John's RC Primary School
- St Joseph's RC Primary School
- St Margaret's RC Primary School
- St Mark's RC Primary School
- St Mary's RC Primary School (Edinburgh)
- St Mary's RC Primary School (Leith)
- St Ninian's RC Primary School
- St Peter's RC Primary School
- Stenhouse Primary School
- Stockbridge Primary School
- The Royal High Primary School
- Tollcross Primary School
- Towerbank Primary School
- Trinity Primary School
- Victoria Primary School
- Wardie Primary School

=== Secondary schools ===
- Balerno Community High School
- Boroughmuir High School
- Broughton High School
- Castlebrae Community High School
- Craigmount High School
- Craigroyston Community High School
- Currie Community High School
- Drummond Community High School
- Firrhill High School
- Forrester High School
- Gracemount High School
- Holy Rood High School
- James Gillespie's High School
- Leith Academy
- Liberton High School
- Portobello High School
- Queensferry High School
- St Augustine's High School
- St Thomas of Aquin's High School
- The Royal High School
- Trinity Academy
- Tynecastle High School
- Wester Hailes Education Centre

=== Special schools ===
- Braidburn School
- Edinburgh Secure Services (Howdenhall)
- Gorgie Mills School
- Kaimes School
- Oaklands School
- Pilrig Park School
- Prospect Bank School
- Redhall School
- Rowanfield School
- St Crispin's School
- Woodlands School

== Glasgow City council area ==
=== Primary schools ===
- Alexandra Parade Primary School
- Anderston Primary School
- Annette Street Primary School
- Antonine Primary School
- Ashpark Primary School
- Aultmore Park Primary School
- Avenue End Primary School
- Balornock Primary School
- Bankhead Primary School
- Barmulloch Primary School
- Battlefield Primary School
- Blackfriars Primary School
- Blairdardie Primary School
- Broomhill Primary School
- Broomlea Primary School
- Bun-sgoil Ghàidhlig Bhaile a’ Ghobhainn (Govan Gaelic Primary School)
- Cadder Primary School
- Caldercuilt Primary School
- Caledonia Primary School
- Camstradden Primary School
- Cardonald Primary School
- Carmunnock Primary School
- Carmyle Primary School
- Carntyne Primary School
- Castleton Primary School
- Chirnsyde Primary School
- Cleeves Primary School
- Clyde Primary School
- Corpus Christi Primary School
- Crookston Castle Primary School
- Craigton Primary School
- Cranhill Primary School
- Croftcroighn Primary School
- Croftfoot Primary School
- Cuthbertson Primary School
- Dalmarnock Primary School
- Darnley Primary School and Visual Impairment Unit
- Drummore Primary School
- Dunard Primary School
- Eastbank Primary School
- Eastmuir Primary School
- Elmvale Primary School
- Garnetbank Primary School
- Garrowhill Primary School
- Glasgow Gaelic School/ Sgoil Ghàidhlig Ghlaschu
- Glendale Gaelic Primary School
- Glendale Primary School
- Golfhill Primary School
- Gowanbank Primary School
- Haghill Park Primary School
- Hampden Primary School
- Highpark Primary School
- Hillhead Primary School
- Hillington Primary School
- Holy Cross Primary School
- Howford Primary School
- Hyndland Primary School
- Ibrox Primary School
- John Paul II Primary School
- Kelbourne Park Primary School
- Kelvindale Primary School
- King's Park Primary School
- Kirkriggs Primary School
- Knightswood Primary School
- Langfaulds Primary School
- Langlands Primary School
- Langside Primary School
- Lorne Street Primary School
- Lourdes Primary School
- Merrylee Primary School
- Miller Primary School
- Miltonbank Primary School
- Mosspark Primary School
- Mount Florida Primary School
- Mount Vernon Primary School
- Notre Dame Primary School
- Oakgrove Primary School
- Oakwood Primary School
- Our Lady of the Annunciation Primary School
- Our Lady of Peace Primary School
- Our Lady of the Rosary Primary School
- Parkview Primary School
- Pirie Park Primary
- Pollokshields Primary School
- Quarry Brae Primary School
- Riverbank Primary School
- Riverside Primary School
- Royston Primary School
- Sacred Heart Primary School
- Sandaig Primary School
- Sandwood Primary School
- Saracen Primary School
- Scotstoun Primary School
- Shawlands Primary School
- Sunnyside Primary School
- Swinton Primary School
- St Albert's Primary School
- St Angela's Primary School
- St Anne's Primary School
- St Bartholomew's Primary School
- St Benedict's Primary School
- St Bernard's Primary School
- St Blane's Primary School
- St Brendan's Primary School
- St Bride's Primary School
- St Brigid's Primary School
- St Bridget's Primary School
- St Catherine's Primary School
- St Charles' Primary School
- St Clare's Primary School
- St Constantine's Primary School
- St Conval's Primary School
- St Cuthbert's Primary School
- St Denis' Primary School
- St Fillan's Primary School
- St Francis' Primary School
- St Francis of Assisi Primary School
- St George's Primary School
- St Joachim's Primary School
- St Joseph's Primary School
- St Kevin's Primary School
- St Marnock's Primary School
- St Martha's Primary School
- St Mary's Primary School
- St Maria Goretti Primary School
- St Michael's Primary School
- St Mirin's Primary School
- St Monica's (Pollok) Primary School
- St Monica's (Milton) Primary School
- St Mungo's Primary School
- St Ninian's Primary School
- St Patrick's Primary School
- St Paul's (Shettleston) Primary School
- St Paul's (Whiteinch) Primary School
- St Philomena's Primary School
- St Roch's Primary School
- St Rose of Lima Primary School
- St Saviour's Primary School
- St Stephen's Primary School
- St Teresa's Primary School
- St Thomas' Primary School
- St Timothy's Primary School
- St Vincent's Primary School
- Thorntree Primary School
- Thornwood Primary School
- Tinto Primary School
- Toryglen Primary School
- Wallacewell Primary School
- Wellshot Primary School
- Whiteinch Primary School

=== Secondary schools ===
Non-denominational schools

- Bannerman High School
- Bellahouston Academy
- Castlemilk High School
- Cleveden Secondary School
- Drumchapel High School
- Eastbank Academy
- Govan High School
- Hillhead High School
- Hillpark Secondary School
- Hyndland Secondary School
- King's Park Secondary School
- Knightswood Secondary School
- Lochend Community High School
- Rosshall Academy
- Shawlands Academy
- Smithycroft Secondary School
- Springburn Academy
- Whitehill Secondary School

Roman Catholic schools

- All Saints Secondary School
- Holyrood Secondary School
- John Paul Academy
- Lourdes Secondary School
- Notre Dame High School
- St Andrew's Secondary School
- St Margaret Mary's Secondary School
- St Mungo's Academy
- St Paul's High School
- St Roch's Secondary School
- St Thomas Aquinas Secondary School

=== Gaelic School ===
- Glasgow Gaelic School (Sgoil Ghàidhlig Ghlaschu)

=== Special Schools ===
- Abercorn Secondary School
- Cardinal Winning Secondary School
- Cartvale Secondary School
- Hollybrook Academy
- Linburn Academy
- Parkhill Secondary School
- St Oswald's Secondary School

== Special schools ==
Easterhouse

- Newhills School

== Area unspecified ==
=== Special schools ===
- Ladywell School

== See also ==
- List of independent schools in Scotland
- List of state schools in Scotland (council areas excluding cities, A–D)
- List of state schools in Scotland (council areas excluding cities, E–H)
- List of state schools in Scotland (council areas excluding cities, I–R)
- List of state schools in Scotland (council areas excluding cities, S–W)
- List of Catholic schools in Scotland
- Education in the United Kingdom
- Education in Scotland
- Education Scotland
