= List of places in Dundee =

This List of places in Dundee is a list of any town, village and hamlet in the Dundee City council area of Scotland.

== A ==
- Abertay University
- Ardler

== B ==
- Balgay, Balgay Hill
- Balgillo
- Balgowan
- Ballumbie
- Barnhill
- Blackness
- Broughty Ferry, Broughty Ferry railway station

== C ==
- Caird Hall
- Camperdown, Camperdown Country Park
- Charleston
- City Centre
- Claverhouse
- Craigiebank

== D ==
- Dens Park
- Douglas
- Downfield
- Duncan of Jordanstone School of Art and Design
- Dundee Airport
- Dundee and Arbroath Railway
- Dundee Contemporary Arts
- Dundee Parish Church (St Mary's)
- Dundee railway station
- Dundee Repertory Theatre

== F ==
- Fairmuir
- Fintry
- Firth of Tay

== G ==
- Gowrie Park
- Grove Academy

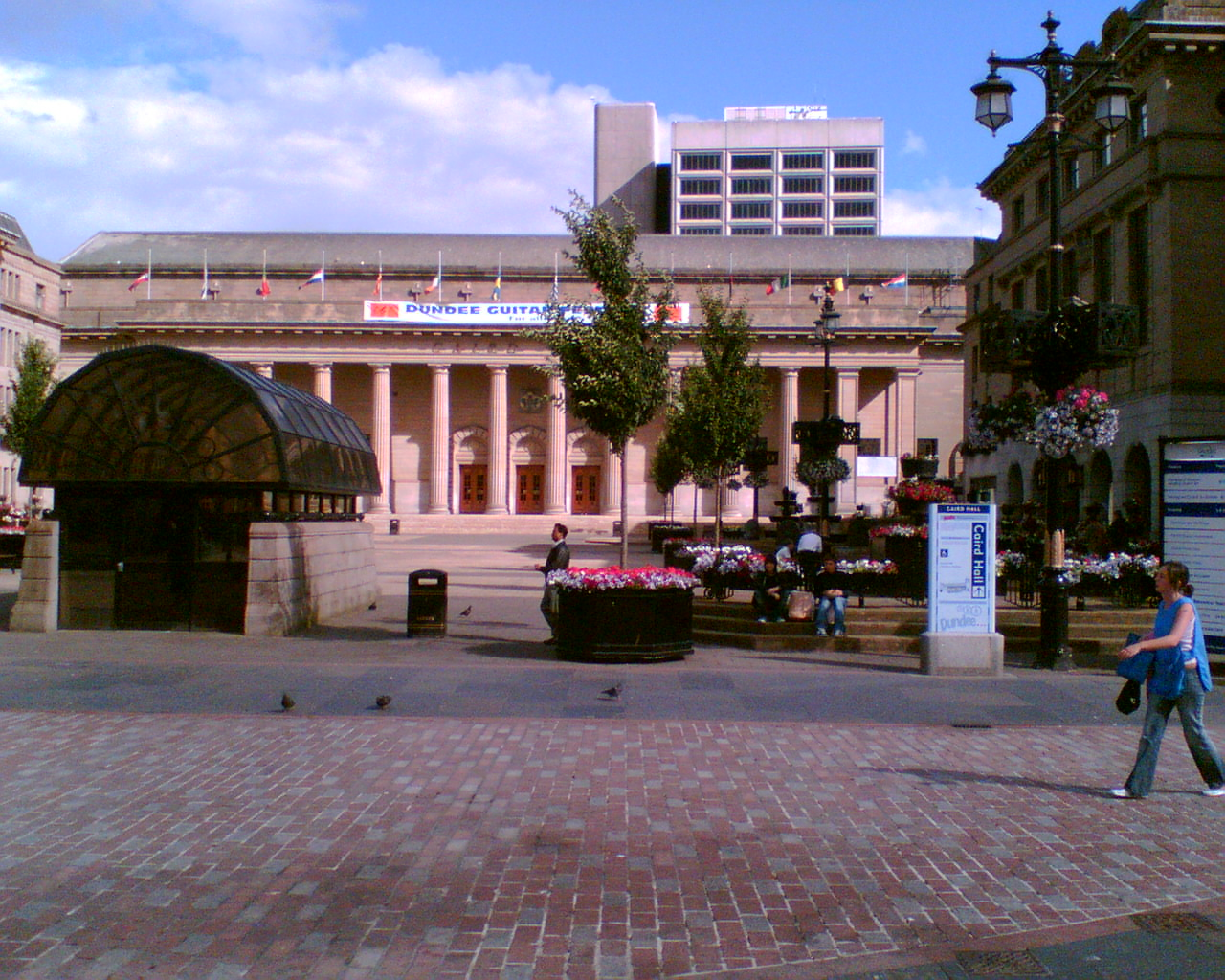
City Square

== H ==
- Harris Academy
- Hilltown

== K ==
- Kirkton

== L ==
- Law
- Lawside
- Lochee
- Logie
- Linlathen

== M ==
- McManus Galleries
- Menzieshill
- Mid Craigie
- Mill of Mains
- Mills Observatory

== N ==
- Ninewells

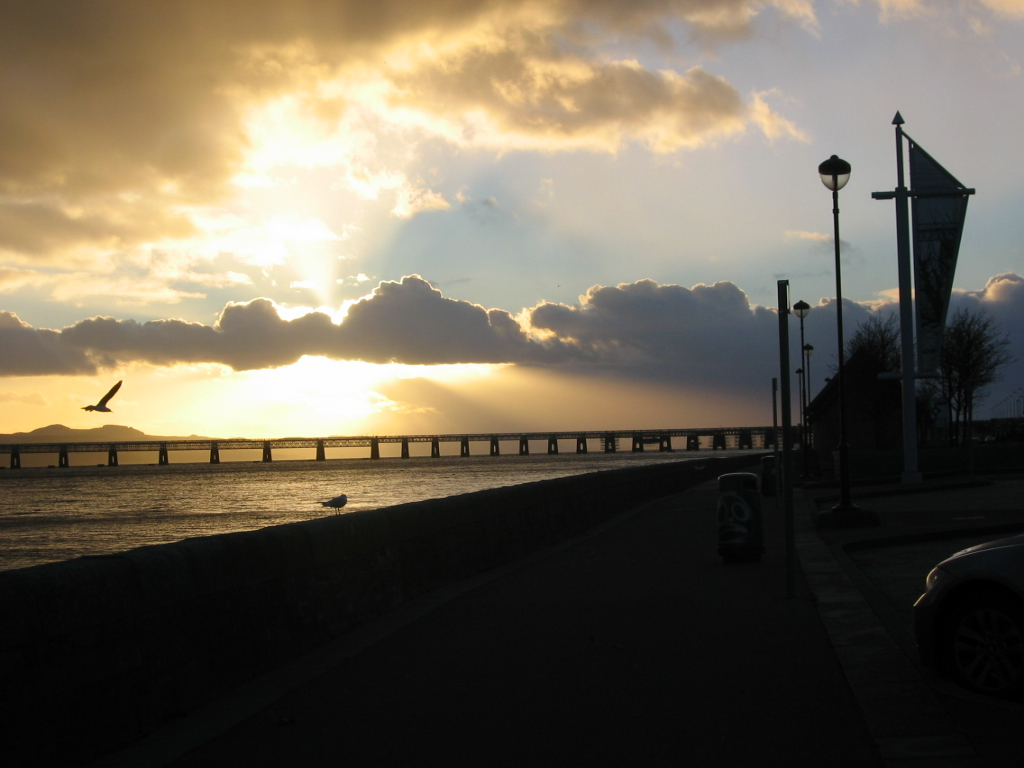
Tay Rail Bridge

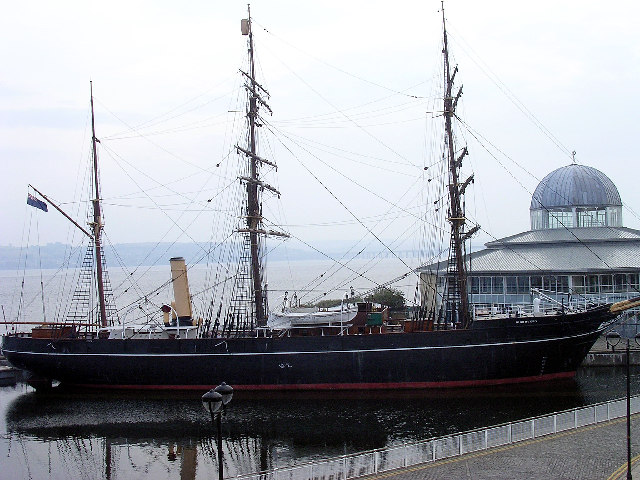
The "Discovery" berthed at Dundee

== P ==
- Pitkerro

== R ==
- River Tay
- RRS Discovery

== S ==
- St Marys
- St Paul's Cathedral
- Scottish Dance Theatre, Scottish School of Contemporary Dance
- Steeple Church
- Stobswell

== T ==
- Tannadice Park
- Tay Rail Bridge
- Tay Road Bridge

== U ==
- University of Dundee

== W ==
- West End
- Western Cemetery, Perth Road
- Whitfield
- Woodside

== See also ==
- List of places in Scotland
