= List of schools in Dundee =

This is a list of schools in Dundee, Scotland. As of 2026, the city is home to eight secondary schools (seven state-run and one private), 38 primary schools (37 state-run and one private), and one state-run special educational needs school. All listed state schools are operated by Dundee City Council.

== Background ==
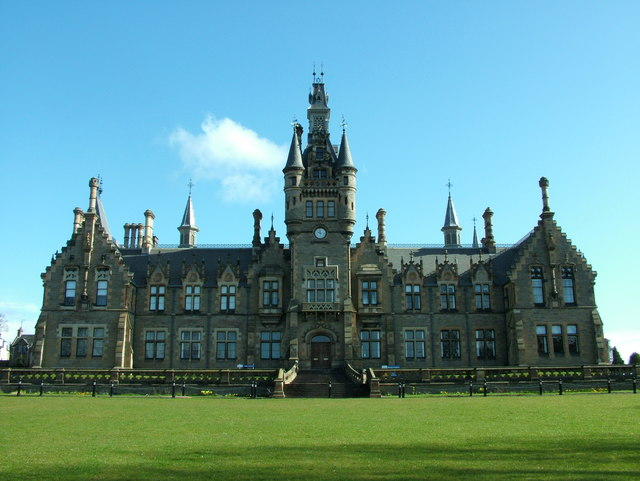
Morgan Academy, a historic secondary school in Dundee.

Education in Dundee has undergone significant restructuring throughout the 21st century. To modernise the city's educational estate, Dundee City Council has invested heavily in rebuilding programmes and school amalgamations.

Notable structural changes include the 2008 merger of older Catholic secondary schools—Lawside Academy and St Saviour's High School—to create St Paul's RC Academy. In 2016, the council controversially closed Menzieshill High School, redirecting its pupils to a newly rebuilt Harris Academy.

The most recent major development was the opening of Greenfield Academy in August 2025. Situated within the new £100 million Drumgeith Community Campus, the school was formed by merging Braeview Academy and Craigie High School into a single, state-of-the-art facility.

== Primary schools ==
=== Non-denominational ===
- Ancrum Road Primary School
- Ardler Primary School
- Ballumbie Primary School
- Barnhill Primary School
- Blackness Primary School
- Camperdown Primary School
- Claypotts Castle Primary School
- Clepington Primary School
- Craigiebarns Primary School
- Craigowl Primary School
- Dens Road Primary School
- Downfield Primary School
- Eastern Primary School
- Fintry Primary School
- Forthill Primary School
- Glebelands Primary School
- Longhaugh Primary School
- Mill of Mains Primary School
- Rosebank Primary School
- Rowantree Primary School
- Sidlaw View Primary School
- Tayview Primary School
- Victoria Park Primary School

=== Roman Catholic ===
- Our Lady's RC Primary School
- SS Peter and Paul RC Primary School
- St. Andrew's RC Primary School
- St. Clement's RC Primary School
- St. Francis RC Primary School
- St. Fergus' RC Primary School
- St. Joseph's RC Primary School
- St. Mary's RC Primary School
- St. Ninian's RC Primary School
- St. Pius RC Primary School

== Secondary schools ==
- Baldragon Academy
- Greenfield Academy – Formed by the merger of Braeview Academy and Craigie High School, opening in August 2025.
- Grove Academy
- Harris Academy – Dundee's oldest public school, founded in 1885. It absorbed Menzieshill High School in 2016.
- Morgan Academy – A Category A listed building that was completely rebuilt following a severe fire in 2001.
- St John's RC High School
- St Paul's RC Academy – Formed in 2008 by the merger of Lawside Academy and St Saviour's High School.

=== Former secondary schools ===
- Braeview Academy – Closed in 2025 and merged to form the new Greenfield Academy.
- Craigie High School – Closed in 2025 and merged to form the new Greenfield Academy.
- Lawside Academy – Closed in 2008 and merged with St Saviour's to form St Paul's RC Academy.
- Linlathen High School – Closed in 1996 due to falling school rolls; pupils transferred to Craigie High School and Braeview Academy. The building was subsequently demolished.
- Logie Secondary School – Closed in 1993. The building served as an annexe for Harris Academy before being demolished.
- Menzieshill High School – Closed in 2016; pupils were relocated to the rebuilt Harris Academy.
- Rockwell High School – Closed in 1997; pupils were divided between Harris Academy and Lawside Academy.
- St. Saviour's RC High School – Closed in 2008 and merged with Lawside Academy to form St Paul's RC Academy.

== Independent schools ==
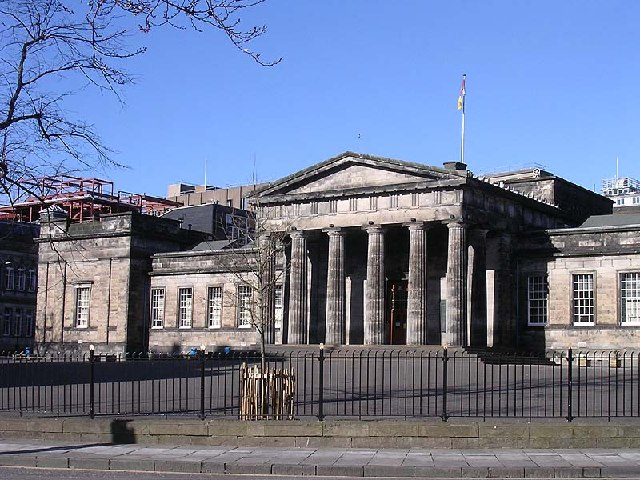
The High School of Dundee, the city's only independent school.

- The High School of Dundee – Provides both primary and secondary education.

== Assisted learning schools ==
- Kingspark School – A specialised school catering to children and young people with complex additional support needs.

== See also ==
- Abertay University
- Dundee and Angus College
- University of Dundee
