= Fintry Primary School =

Location
- Findcastle Terrace; Fintry, Dundee, DD4 9EL; Scotland; 56.489897°N 2.944691°W

Information
- Type: State primary
- Local authority: Dundee City Council
- Head teacher: Nicola Weryk
- Gender: Mixed
- Feeder to: Greenfield Academy

Fintry Primary School is a co-educational non-denominational state primary school situated in the Fintry area in the north of Dundee, Scotland. Managed by Dundee City Council, the school provides early years and primary education to children from nursery age up to Primary 7.

== Overview ==
Located on Findcastle Terrace, the school was established to serve the families of Fintry, a major post-war residential development in the city. Today, it operates as a central educational hub for the community, encompassing both mainstream primary classes and the dedicated Fintry Early Years Centre for nursery provision.

To improve pupil safety and encourage active travel, the school's surrounding roads were incorporated into a pedestrianised "School Streets" zone in 2021, restricting vehicular traffic around the campus during peak drop-off and pick-up times.

A distinctive feature of the school's educational environment is its specialised support network. Rather than standard numbering or generic support unit titles, Fintry Primary utilises a series of uniquely named learning spaces—such as the Hummingbird, Robin, Puffin, and Flamingo rooms—which provide tailored support and nurturing environments for specific pupil needs alongside standard classroom teaching.

== Secondary cluster ==
Historically, Fintry Primary School acted as a direct feeder for Braeview Academy, which was located on the periphery of the Fintry area. However, following the major city-wide educational reshuffle in 2025 that saw Braeview merge with Craigie High School, pupils completing Primary 7 now transition to the newly established Greenfield Academy.

To support this shift, the primary school operates a comprehensive transition programme in close partnership with the Greenfield campus staff to ensure pupils are fully prepared for the social and academic adjustments of entering S1.

== See also ==
- List of schools in Dundee
