= Longhaugh Primary School =

Location
- 9 Lothian Crescent; Whitfield, Dundee, DD4 0SX; Scotland; 56.489719°N 2.927676°W

Information
- Type: State primary
- Local authority: Dundee City Council
- Head teacher: Nicola Jenkins
- Gender: Mixed
- Enrollment: 262
- Feeder to: Greenfield Academy

Longhaugh Primary School is a co-educational non-denominational state primary school located in the Whitfield area of Dundee, Scotland. Managed by Dundee City Council, the school caters to children from nursery age up to Primary 7, drawing its pupil body primarily from the surrounding Whitfield and Fintry districts.

== Campus and architecture ==
In 2018, Longhaugh relocated into the newly constructed North East Campus, a £15.6 million purpose-built educational facility situated on Lothian Crescent. Designed by architectural firms Holmes Miller and Atelier Ten, the building features an energy-efficient A-rated EPC design built around a large central atrium. The school shares this expansive modern facility with St Francis RC Primary School and Quarry View Nursery School, integrating mainstream education, early years provision, and shared community sports facilities under a single roof.

The Longhaugh campus also hosts the Longhaugh Support Group (LSG), a local authority specialist provision unit that provides targeted, small-group support and tailored education plans for pupils with additional learning needs.

== Environmental initiatives ==
The school places a significant emphasis on environmental and outdoor education. In 2023, Longhaugh was selected as one of five institutions across the city to launch and lead the Dundee Nature Schools programme in partnership with NatureScot. Through this initiative, the school established "Nature Clusters", allowing pupils to explore STEM (Science, Technology, Engineering, and Mathematics) subjects outside the traditional classroom by utilising local natural environments and outdoor learning spaces.

== Secondary cluster ==
Following the completion of Primary 7, pupils at Longhaugh transition to Greenfield Academy for their secondary education. The school works collaboratively with the Greenfield staff to run structured transition programmes, ensuring students are socially and academically prepared to move into the much larger high school environment in S1.

== See also ==
- List of schools in Dundee
