= Sidlaw View Primary School =

Location
- 67A Harestane Road; Dundee, DD3 0LF; Scotland; 56.495296°N 2.990696°W

Information
- Type: Primary school
- Local authority: Dundee City Council
- Head teacher: Kelly Flynn
- Gender: Mixed
- Feeder to: Baldragon Academy

Sidlaw View Primary School is a co-educational non-denominational primary school in the Downfield area of northern Dundee, Scotland. Managed by Dundee City Council, the school operates from a modern shared educational campus along Harestane Road.

== Campus history and building design ==
In March 2017, Sidlaw View officially relocated into a purpose-built £8.1 million modern facility. Constructed by Robertson Tayside as part of a wider community regeneration project, the two-stream building was built to accommodate up to 400 pupils.

The architectural layout was deliberately designed to integrate early years education with primary and secondary schooling. The building physically co-locates the primary school with the Jessie Porter Nursery and shares its immediate site with Baldragon Academy. The interior layout of the primary school departs from traditional classroom corridors, featuring expansive break-out spaces, a dedicated production kitchen, and specialised areas tailored specifically for drama and music provision.

== Secondary cluster ==
Pupils completing Primary 7 at Sidlaw View transition across the shared educational campus to attend Baldragon Academy for their secondary education. The physical proximity of the two buildings allows for extensive collaboration between primary and secondary staff, ensuring pupils are socially and academically prepared for their move into S1.

== See also ==
- List of schools in Dundee
