= Craigiebarns Primary School =

Location
- Brington Road; Dundee, DD4 7UH; Scotland; 56.472152°N 2.91629°W

Information
- Type: State primary
- Established: 1970
- Local authority: Dundee City Council
- Head teacher: Karen Clarke
- Gender: Mixed
- Capacity: 300
- Feeder to: Greenfield Academy

Craigiebarns Primary School is a co-educational non-denominational state primary school situated in the Craigiebank area in the east of Dundee, Scotland. Administered by Dundee City Council, the school provides early years and primary education to children from nursery age up to Primary 7.

== Overview and facilities ==
The school operates from a spacious campus located at the end of Brington Road. Rather than being confined to a heavily built-up urban footprint, the school benefits from expansive outdoor recreational grounds that feature a large grass sports pitch and a dedicated woodland area designed to enhance outdoor learning and play.

In addition to its mainstream classes and nursery provision (which accommodates around 40 children), Craigiebarns is notable for its enhanced support unit for children with visual impairments. The school is staffed by Visual Impairment Specialists from the city's Accessibility and Inclusion Service (AIS), who integrate with mainstream teaching staff to deliver tailored educational support for specific pupils.

== Secondary cluster ==
Following the completion of Primary 7, pupils at Craigiebarns typically transition to Greenfield Academy for their secondary education. This follows the closure and merger of the school's historical feeder, Craigie High School.

== See also ==
- List of schools in Dundee
