= Woodside, Dundee =

Area of Dundee, Scotland

Coordinates: 56.479936°N 2.967615°W

Woodside
- Location within Dundee City council area Location within Scotland
- OS grid reference: NO405324
- Council area: Dundee City
- Lieutenancy area: Dundee
- Country: Scotland
- Sovereign state: United Kingdom
- Post town: DUNDEE
- Postcode district: DD3
- Dialling code: 01382
- Police: Scotland
- Fire: Scottish
- Ambulance: Scottish
- UK Parliament: Dundee East
- Scottish Parliament: Dundee City East

Woodside is a small housing area in the north of Dundee, Scotland. The area runs between Graham Street, Mains Loan and lengthwise to the Kingsway. The residential housing is mainly 1920s constructions with four homes to a block.

The area is within a walkable distance of the amenities of Clepington Road, however it is home to one corner shop, Graham St. News.

Xplore Dundee service the area with the No. 21 - Woodside route, which runs Monday to Saturday, from 05:50 until 18:20. A Sunday service is provided by the redirected 18A - Kirkton.
