= Craigowl Primary School =

Location
- 112 Laird Street; Dundee, DD3 9NY; Scotland; 56.495499°N 3.013339°W

Information
- Type: State primary
- Established: 2008; 18 years ago
- Local authority: Dundee City Council
- Head teacher: Gerard Munro
- Gender: Mixed
- Enrollment: 341
- Feeder to: Baldragon Academy

Craigowl Primary School is a co-educational non-denominational state primary school situated in the St Mary's area in the north-west of Dundee, Scotland. Managed by Dundee City Council, the school provides early learning and primary education for children from nursery age through to Primary 7.

== Overview and ethos ==
Opened in 2008, Craigowl operates from a modern, purpose-built campus on Laird Street. The school was designed to serve as a central educational hub for the surrounding residential areas in north-west Dundee. Alongside its mainstream primary classes, the campus includes a dedicated early years centre that accommodates nursery-aged children.

Craigowl places a strong emphasis on community integration and pastoral care, operating under a core school vision designed to ensure that every pupil feels "loved, loving, and loveable" within their educational environment. The school also houses an Enhanced Support Area (ESA), providing tailored classroom integration for children who require additional learning support.

== Secondary cluster ==
Upon completing Primary 7, pupils at Craigowl typically transition to Baldragon Academy for their secondary education. The primary school works closely with the academy's learning community to ensure a structured and supportive transition into S1.

== See also ==
- List of schools in Dundee
