= Downfield Primary School =

Location
- 20 Haldane Crescent; Downfield, Dundee, DD3 0JP; Scotland; 56.489177°N 2.99234°W

Information
- Type: State primary
- Local authority: Dundee City Council
- Head teacher: Karen Emmett
- Gender: Mixed
- Enrollment: 330
- Feeder to: Baldragon Academy

Downfield Primary School is a co-educational non-denominational state primary school situated in the Downfield area in Dundee, Scotland. Administered by Dundee City Council, the school provides early years and primary education to children from nursery age up to Primary 7.

== Overview and ethos ==
Operating from its campus on Haldane Crescent, the school serves as a central educational and community hub for the surrounding residential areas in north-west Dundee. Alongside the mainstream primary classrooms, the campus also hosts the Downfield Early Years Centre, providing integrated nursery provision for the local community.

Rather than focusing strictly on traditional academic metrics, Downfield operates as a "values-based learning community" designed to celebrate personal development, life skills, and non-academic successes. A unique feature of the school's structure is its heavy emphasis on "pupil voice"; the school actively runs numerous pupil improvement groups where students collaborate directly with staff to make operational and creative decisions regarding the school's environment and daily life.

== Secondary cluster ==
Following the completion of Primary 7, the majority of pupils at Downfield transition to Baldragon Academy for their secondary education. Downfield forms a key part of the Baldragon cluster network, collaborating closely with both the academy and other associated primary schools (such as Sidlaw View, Craigowl, and Ardler) to facilitate structured sports, educational, and transition programmes for students moving into S1.

== See also ==
- List of schools in Dundee
