= Downfield =

Downfield may refer to:

- Downfield, Dundee, an area of Dundee, Scotland
  - Downfield F.C., a Scottish junior football club based in the Downfield area of Dundee
