= SS Peter and Paul RC Primary School =

SS Peter & Paul RC Primary School

Location
- Byron Street; Dundee, DD3 6QN; Scotland; 56.473278°N 2.981021°W

Information
- Type: Primary school
- Religious affiliation: Roman Catholic
- Local authority: Dundee City Council
- Head teacher: Denise Derby
- Gender: Mixed
- Feeder to: St John's RC High School

SS Peter & Paul RC Primary School is a co-educational Roman Catholic primary school situated across the Coldside and Hilltown areas of Dundee, Scotland. Managed by Dundee City Council.

== Overview and grounds ==
Providing denominational education for the northern area of the city, the school shares its immediate physical site with the Ss Peter and Paul Roman Catholic Church. This direct proximity allows the school to closely integrate its daily curriculum and assemblies with the active parish community.

The building maintains a strong focus on Catholic values and pupil wellbeing, creating a positive ethos centered around community inclusion. The school runs several local outreach initiatives alongside the neighbouring church and routinely utilises the adjacent parish facilities for school-wide religious events and celebrations. Furthermore, pupils actively participate in charitable fundraising for organisations such as Macmillan Cancer Support and Mary's Meals, while the school's commitment to environmental education has been recognised by the Eco-Schools Scotland programme.

== Secondary feeder school ==
As part of Dundee's denominational education pathway, SS Peter & Paul serves as an associated primary for St John's RC High School. Once children reach the end of their primary education, they are offered a direct transfer to the St John's building on Harefield Road to begin S1 alongside pupils from the city's other Catholic primaries.

== See also ==
- List of schools in Dundee
