= Ardler Primary School =

School in Dundee, Scotland

Location
- Turnberry Avenue; Dundee, DD2 3TP; Scotland; 56.488835°N 3.013704°W

Information
- Type: State primary
- Established: 1968; 58 years ago
- Local authority: Dundee City Council
- Head teacher: Louise Reid
- Gender: Mixed
- Capacity: 105
- Feeder to: Baldragon Academy

Ardler Primary School is a co-educational non-denominational state primary school located in the Ardler area of Dundee, Scotland. Managed by Dundee City Council, it provides early learning and primary education for children from Nursery through Primary 7 (ages 3–12). With a primary roll of approximately 105 pupils, it is currently the smallest primary school in Dundee.

== Overview ==
The school serves the residential area of Ardler in north-west Dundee. Education is delivered under Scotland's Curriculum for Excellence framework, with a strong focus on literacy, numeracy, health, and wellbeing. In addition to its primary classes, the school operates a nursery provision for children aged 2 to 5 years old.

The school complex is located on Turnberry Avenue, sharing its immediate site footprint with St Fergus' RC Primary School.

== Secondary cluster ==
Ardler Primary School forms part of the Baldragon Academy educational cluster. Primary 7 pupils participate in structured primary-to-secondary transition events with Baldragon Academy to prepare for entry into S1, which includes joint curriculum engagement and pastoral support.

== Inspection and governance ==
The school is inspected periodically by Education Scotland to evaluate learning quality, leadership, and pupil attainment. Governance, operational support, and funding are provided by Dundee City Council's Children and Families Service.

== See also ==
- List of schools in Dundee
