= Rosebank Primary School =

Location
- 15 Alexander Street; Dundee, DD3 7DL; Scotland; 56.468281°N 2.971475°W

Information
- Type: Primary school
- Local authority: Dundee City Council
- Head teacher: Jennifer Heffell
- Gender: Mixed
- Feeder to: Morgan Academy

Rosebank Primary School is a co-educational non-denominational primary school situated in the Hilltown area of Dundee, Scotland. Managed by Dundee City Council, the school provides education for children living just north of the city centre.

== Overview and campus ==
Since August 2018, Rosebank has operated from the purpose-built Coldside Campus on Alexander Street. The £16 million modern facility is a shared educational site, jointly housing Rosebank alongside Our Lady's RC Primary School and the Frances Wright Nursery School.

The school places a heavy focus on pupil wellbeing and inclusive education. In late 2022, Rosebank achieved national recognition when it became the first mainstream school in Scotland to receive autism accreditation. The school was presented with the Autism Inclusion Award by the National Autistic Society, acknowledging its implementation of sensory areas, specialised staff training, and an inclusive playground environment tailored specifically for autistic pupils.

== Secondary cluster ==
Upon completing Primary 7, pupils at Rosebank transition to Morgan Academy for their secondary education. The primary school coordinates with Morgan Academy staff to run combined academic and social transition sessions throughout the final year to prepare pupils for the move into S1.

== See also ==
- List of schools in Dundee
