= Ancrum Road Primary School =

School in Dundee, Scotland

Location
- 47 Ancrum Road; Dundee, DD2 2HX; Scotland; 56.469082°N 3.008517°W

Information
- Type: Primary school
- Established: 1876; 150 years ago
- Local authority: Dundee City Council
- Head teacher: Sharon McQuillan
- Gender: Mixed
- Capacity: 413

Ancrum Road Primary School is a co-educational non-denominational state primary school located in the Lochee area of Dundee, Scotland. Managed by Dundee City Council, it provides early learning and primary education from Nursery through Primary 7 (ages 3–12).

== Overview ==
The school serves the Lochee and surrounding residential areas in western Dundee. Education is delivered under Scotland's Curriculum for Excellence framework, focusing on literacy, numeracy, health, and wellbeing. The school facilities include main teaching blocks, early learning accommodation, and outdoor play areas.

== History ==
Ancrum Road Primary School first opened in 1876. Historically, the institution was known as Ancrum Road Public School.

In 2021, Dundee City Council revised the school's catchment area, alongside several other local primary schools, to address and accommodate future pupil rolls. More recently, in 2024, local artist Linda Brownlee (known as Linda B Draws Dundee) gifted a painting to the school after a class was inspired by her artwork.

== Secondary cluster ==
Ancrum Road Primary School forms part of the Harris Academy educational cluster. Primary 7 pupils participate in structured primary-to-secondary transition events with Harris Academy, including orientation visits, joint curricular activities, and pastoral support initiatives prior to entering S1.

== Inspection and governance ==
The school is inspected periodically by Education Scotland to evaluate learning quality, leadership, and pupil attainment. Governance, operational support, and funding are provided by Dundee City Council's Children and Families Service.

== See also ==
- List of schools in Dundee
