= Garnet Wilson =

Scottish businessman (1885–1975)

Garnet Wilson (1885–1975) was a Scottish businessman and Liberal politician who served as Lord Provost of Dundee. He has been described as 'one of the most prominent figures in public life in Dundee in the mid twentieth century'.

== Life and career ==
Garnet Wilson was born in Cupar, Fife, in 1885. He was the son of Gavin Laurie Wilson (1852–1932), the founder and owner of G.L. Wilson's Department Store, Dundee. G. L. Wilson had originally set up business in Cupar moving to open his department store in Dundee, locally referred to as 'the Corner' in 1894. While in Cupar, G. L. Wilson had been a member of the Town Council and the School Board.

Garnet Wilson was educated at Bell Baxter High School, Newport Public School and finally spent a year at the High School of Dundee. He then became involved in his father's business along with his brother John. G. L. Wilson's department store was heavily patronised in Dundee and was particularly well known for its popular Christmas grotto. Garnet Wilson reportedly often gave excited small children who were visiting it an extra penny as a gift.

A Liberal, in 1922 he backed the candidature of the Asquithite Liberal R. R. Pilkington in Dundee against Winston Churchill and D. J. MacDonald who were supported by the local Liberal Party. Ultimately all three men were defeated.

Wilson's career in local government started with service on Newport-on-Tay's council from 1919 until 1929. As well as serving in Newport, Wilson was elected to serve on Dundee Education Authority in 1919, serving on it until it was taken over by Dundee Town Council in 1930 and serving as its finance convener, Wilson was elected to Dundee Town Council in 1929, replacing the retiring Sir William High in the sixth ward. He lost his seat in 1935, but was re-elected in 1937. He served as convener of the council's education committee and was reportedly known across Scotland for his work in this role.

In 1940 he became Lord Provost of Dundee, a post he held until 1946. His selection was unusual, as he had not served as a magistrate or as treasurer. He was a popular wartime leader and was knighted for his services to Dundee in 1944. Among his achievements as Lord Provost was his role in persuading the N.C.R. to make Dundee the base of its operations in the United Kingdom in 1945. He also helped establish an airport in the city.

In 1952 Wilson was appointed as chairman of the Glenrothes Development Corporation. At the time he was also vice-chair of the Scottish Advisory Council on Education and a member of the BBC's Scottish Advisory Council. He retired as chairman of the Glenrothes Development Corporation in 1960.

Wilson was a member of the College Council of University College, Dundee, and was its final president. This reflected his wider interest in education. He was a critic of the view advanced by David Coupar Thomson and others that the college should breakaway from the University of St Andrews.

In 1970 he performed the official opening of Craigie High School. Garnet Terrace, which leads to the school, was named in his honour.

Garnet Wilson died aged 90 on 18 September 1975.

== Legacy ==
Archives relating to Sir Garnet Wilson and the G. L. Wilson's business are held by the University of Dundee's Archive Services. Dundee City Archives also hold an extensive collection of material relating to Wilson.

A portrait of Wilson by David Shanks Ewart is held in the Dundee Art Galleries and Museums Collection. The University of Dundee's fine art collection includes a portrait of Wilson, as President of the University College, Dundee's College Council by Rodrigo Moynihan. He is also commemorated with a plaque on a stone in the University of Dundee Botanic Garden.

== Publications ==
- Batchelor's Buttons Murdoch & Paterson (1921)
- The Making of a Lord Provost David Winter & Sons Ltd (1966)
- Overspill. A Record of Anecdote and Activity David Winter & Sons Ltd (1970)
