= Clepington Primary School =

Location
- Eliza Street; Dundee, DD4 6TQ; Scotland; 56.472804°N 2.959175°W

Information
- Type: State primary
- Established: 1907
- Local authority: Dundee City Council
- Head teacher: Louise Riggs
- Gender: Mixed
- Feeder to: Morgan Academy

Clepington Primary School is a co-educational non-denominational state primary school situated in the Stobswell area of Dundee, Scotland. Managed by Dundee City Council, it serves a large, diverse pupil population in the eastern part of the city.

== History and architecture ==
The school operates out of an impressive historic campus that forms a notable part of Stobswell's architectural heritage. Opened in 1907, the primary building was designed by prominent local architect William G. Lamond. The structure is particularly celebrated for its intricate decorative stone carvings and is designated as a listed building by Historic Environment Scotland.

== Overview ==
Clepington Primary functions as a large, inclusive educational environment. Unlike many modern primary campuses, the school continues to fully utilise its spacious traditional early-20th-century classrooms while integrating modern educational resources. Because of its large pupil roll, the school often organises its population into a mixture of straight year groups and composite classes, adapting flexibly to annual demographic shifts.

== Secondary cluster ==
Upon completing their primary education, pupils at Clepington transition to the nearby Morgan Academy for their secondary schooling. The primary and secondary institutions coordinate transition activities to help students prepare for the shift into S1.

== See also ==
- List of schools in Dundee
- List of listed buildings in Dundee
