= Mill of Mains Primary School =

Location
- Barns of Claverhouse Road; Dundee, DD4 9RD; Scotland; 56.493111°N 2.958353°W

Information
- Type: State primary
- Local authority: Dundee City Council
- Head teacher: Ashley Matheson
- Gender: Mixed
- Enrollment: 290
- Feeder to: Greenfield Academy

Mill of Mains Primary School is a co-educational non-denominational primary school situated in the Mill o' Mains area in the northern part of Dundee, Scotland. Administered by Dundee City Council, the school operates as a major educational and community hub for families residing in the immediate residential district, offering both standard primary education and an integrated nursery class.

== Overview and student support ==
Located on Barns of Claverhouse Road, the school campus sits in close proximity to the Trottick Mill Ponds Local Nature Reserve, which allows for regular outdoor learning opportunities.

Mill of Mains places a heavy emphasis on student wellbeing and inclusive family support. The school operates a dedicated Young Carers network in direct partnership with the independent Dundee Carers Centre. This programme provides an in-school Young Carer Coordinator and a dedicated Link Worker to assist pupils who balance their education with caring responsibilities at home.

The school also maintains a strong extracurricular sports presence, collaborating closely with local community organisations. Pupils regularly participate in regional athletic festivals, with the school operating active partnerships with Dundee Rugby Club and local basketball teams to promote physical health and community integration.

== Secondary cluster ==
Upon completing Primary 7, the majority of students at Mill of Mains transition to Greenfield Academy for their secondary education. To ensure students are well-prepared for the shift into S1, the primary school engages in joint sporting and academic transition events hosted at the Greenfield campus throughout the academic year.

== See also ==
- List of schools in Dundee
