= Rowantree Primary School =

Location
- 1 Birks Terrace; Dundee, DD4 8EJ; Scotland; 56.482501°N 2.939529°W

Information
- Type: Primary school
- Local authority: Dundee City Council
- Head teacher: Christina Ross
- Gender: Mixed
- Feeder to: Greenfield Academy

Rowantree Primary School is a co-educational non-denominational primary school situated in the Mid Craigie and Linlathen area of eastern Dundee, Scotland. Managed by Dundee City Council.

== Overview and student support ==
Rowantree places a heavy focus on pupil wellbeing and actively supports children who manage complex home lives alongside their education. Similar to other local schools, Rowantree hosts an in-house Young Carers network created in partnership with the independent Dundee Carers Centre. This setup provides a dedicated Link Worker on site to support children who hold caring duties within their households.

To improve physical health and community inclusion, the school plays a significant role in the Scottish FA's "Extra Time" programme. Delivered locally by the community sports trust of local football club Dundee United, this initiative collects pupils from Rowantree after class and transports them to nearby community sports hubs. The children receive healthy hot meals and participate in supervised physical activities and sports coaching, providing crucial after-school care for low-income and single-parent families.

== Secondary cluster ==
Pupils finishing Primary 7 move on to Greenfield Academy for their secondary education. The primary school coordinates with Greenfield staff to run combined physical and classroom transition sessions throughout the final year to ensure pupils are prepared for the shift into S1.

== See also ==
- List of schools in Dundee
