= St. Andrew's RC Primary School =

St Andrew's RC Primary School

Location
- St. Leonard Place; Dundee, DD3 9HD; Scotland; 56.492627°N 3.004375°W

Information
- Type: Primary school
- Religious affiliation: Roman Catholic
- Local authority: Dundee City Council
- Head teacher: Annamarie Flynn
- Gender: Mixed
- Feeder to: St Paul's RC Academy

St Andrew's RC Primary School is a co-educational Roman Catholic primary school situated in the north-west of Dundee, Scotland. Managed by Dundee City Council, the educational facility sits along St. Leonard Place.

== Overview and facilities ==
Officially opened on 1 December 2008, the current building was established following the amalgamation of the former St Columba's and St Margaret's primary schools. Built to accommodate modern teaching practices, the site features an integrated nursery, an open-plan library, and a dedicated music and drama studio.

The school heavily promotes physical health and environmentally friendly travel through its partnership with Dundee Active Travel. Operating a "Safer Routes to School" initiative alongside the "I Bike" project, staff and pupils actively encourage walking and cycling to class to reduce both local air pollution and vehicular congestion outside the main gates. Additionally, the grounds sit directly adjacent to local playing fields which are regularly utilised for outdoor sports and community physical education studies.

== Secondary feeder school ==
Operating within Dundee's Catholic education network, St Andrew's acts as a designated feeder for St Paul's RC Academy. Following the completion of Primary 7, pupils transition to the St Paul's site on Gillburn Road to begin their secondary education alongside students from other local denominational primary schools.

== See also ==
- List of schools in Dundee
