= Blackness Primary School =

School in Dundee, Scotland

Location
- Pennycook Lane, Hawkhill; Dundee, DD1 5RT; Scotland; 56.456753°N 2.991834°W

Information
- Type: State primary
- Established: 1892; 134 years ago
- Local authority: Dundee City Council
- Head teacher: Vikki Taylor
- Gender: Mixed
- Feeder to: Harris Academy

Blackness Primary School (historically known as Hawkhill Public School) is a co-educational non-denominational state primary school located in the Hawkhill district of the West End of Dundee, Scotland. Catering to children from nursery age through to Primary 7, it serves the densely populated inner-city neighbourhoods surrounding the Perth Road and Blackness areas.

== History and architecture ==
The school building holds significant architectural importance and is designated as a Category B listed building by Historic Environment Scotland. It was constructed in 1892 by James H. Langlands, who served as the official architect for the Dundee School Board.

Designed in a striking Renaissance style, the multi-storey structure features an ashlar stone frontage, classical ionic pilasters, and a distinctive central hall lit by a large cupola skylight. Due to its exceptionally well-preserved 19th-century educational architecture, one of its classrooms was previously maintained by the Dundee District Museums as an authentic, fully furnished Victorian schoolroom.

== Overview ==
Operating from its traditional Victorian premises on Pennycook Lane, Blackness Primary School balances its historic heritage with modern educational needs. The campus accommodates extensive primary classrooms alongside a dedicated early learning and childcare centre. Unlike modern, single-level sprawling campuses, the school features a traditional multi-tiered layout with central lightwells, and outdoor playground areas adapted to the dense urban environment.

== Secondary cluster ==
Upon completing their primary education, pupils at Blackness typically transition to the nearby Harris Academy to begin their secondary schooling. The schools operate a collaborative transition programme to ensure primary students are academically and socially prepared for the shift into S1.

== See also ==
- List of schools in Dundee
- List of listed buildings in Dundee
