= Pitkerro =

Area of Dundee, Scotland

Coordinates: 56.482879°N 2.935215°W

Pitkerro: Scottish Gaelic: Baile Cheathraimh
- Location within Dundee City council area Location within Scotland
- OS grid reference: NO425327
- Council area: Dundee City
- Lieutenancy area: Dundee
- Country: Scotland
- Sovereign state: United Kingdom
- Post town: DUNDEE
- Postcode district: DD4
- Dialling code: 01382
- Police: Scotland
- Fire: Scottish
- Ambulance: Scottish
- UK Parliament: Dundee East
- Scottish Parliament: Dundee City East

Pitkerro is an area in the eastern part of Dundee, Scotland, immediately west of Douglas and south of Fintry and Whitfield. Areas of Pitkerro include Kingsway East, Linlathen, Mid Craigie, Milton of Craigie and Drumgieth.

Pitkerro House was remodelled and relandscaped by Robert Lorimer in 1902.

Pitkerro once had four schools, three primary and one secondary. The oldest, St Saviour's RC High School, closed in June 2008 due to decreasing pupil numbers and merged with Lawside Academy at the start of the 2008/9 school year to form St. Paul's Academy. Mosgiel Primary School and Mid Craigie Primary School merged at the start of the 2009/10 year to form Rowantree Primary School, a purpose-built school constructed in 2008. Pitkerro's other school, St. Vincent's RC Primary School was amalgamated with St Luke's & St Matthew's RC Primary School in 2018 to form St. Francis RC Primary School and is now located in the new North East Campus building on Lothian Crescent along with Longhaugh Primary School and Quarryview Nursery.

Together, Pitkerro, Kirkton and Hilltown contain 31% of Dundee's enumeration districts which fall within the worst 10% of deprived districts in Scotland.

In 1998, a Mecca Bingo hall opened in the Douglasfield area of Pitkerro with an Odeon Cinema opening two years later.

Pitkerro has two major Supermarkets, Morrisons in Linlathen, and a 24-hour Asda in Milton of Craigie.

The area is served by Dundee bus routes 15a, 15c and 17 operated by Xplore Dundee and 360 operated by Moffat & Williamson.
