= Camperdown Primary School =

Location
- Buttars Street; Dundee, DD2 4PQ; Scotland; 56.474396°N 3.034528°W

Information
- Type: State primary
- Local authority: Dundee City Council
- Head teacher: Ashley Brown
- Gender: Mixed
- Capacity: 232
- Feeder to: Harris Academy

Camperdown Primary School is a co-educational non-denominational state primary school located in the Lochee and Charleston areas of Dundee, Scotland. Managed by Dundee City Council, it provides early learning and primary education for children from nursery age through to Primary 7.

== Overview and campus ==
Camperdown Primary operates from a modern, purpose-built educational facility known as the Balgarthno Campus, located on Buttars Street. Rather than a standalone building, the school was designed as a shared-campus model and is co-located with St Clement's RC Primary School. While both schools retain their own distinct identities, staff, and teaching spaces, they share key central facilities and campus grounds.

The school features a dedicated early learning division, operating a substantial nursery class that provides up to 74 places for the surrounding community's youngest residents.

== Secondary cluster ==
Upon completing their primary education at Camperdown, pupils typically transition into the secondary school system at Harris Academy. The primary and secondary institutions coordinate transition activities to help students acclimate to the larger high school environment before entering S1.

== See also ==
- List of schools in Dundee
