= Glebelands Primary School =

Location
- Baffin Street; Stobswell, Dundee, DD4 6EZ; Scotland; 56.468114°N 2.953121°W

Information
- Type: State primary
- Local authority: Dundee City Council
- Head teacher: Michelle Macleod
- Gender: Mixed
- Enrollment: 365
- Feeder to: Morgan Academy

Glebelands Primary School is a co-educational non-denominational state primary school situated in the Stobswell area of Dundee, Scotland. Administered by Dundee City Council, the institution accommodates roughly 365 primary pupils alongside a dedicated early years centre, delivering education for families residing across the local Stobswell district.

== Overview and campus ==
The school operates from a prominent, three-storey Edwardian building on Baffin Street. Due to its urban, built-up location just north of the city centre, the campus utilises an intricate internal layout spread across traditional floors and mezzanine levels to maximize teaching space.

Glebelands is noted for encouraging strong social awareness among its student body. In 2022, the school received local media attention when its pupils spearheaded a community-wide campaign committed to stamping out racism in Dundee, integrating social justice directly into their classroom projects. The school also operates dedicated support networks for its students, including a Young Carers group managed in partnership with local charities.

== Secondary cluster ==
Following the completion of Primary 7, pupils at Glebelands transition to Morgan Academy for their secondary education. Because both schools are located within the same dense urban catchment area in Stobswell, the primary school maintains very close operational ties with the academy. Staff from both campuses coordinate regularly to facilitate joint learning initiatives and structured transition days for students preparing to enter S1.

== See also ==
- List of schools in Dundee
