= Ballumbie Primary School =

Location
- 70 Lothian Crescent; Dundee, DD4 0HU; Scotland; 56.488966°N 2.916109°W

Information
- Type: State primary
- Established: April 2012; 14 years ago
- Local authority: Dundee City Council
- Head teacher: Paula Chegall
- Gender: Mixed
- Capacity: 386
- Feeder to: Greenfield Academy

Ballumbie Primary School is a co-educational non-denominational state primary school located in the Whitfield area of Dundee, Scotland. Managed by Dundee City Council, it provides early learning and primary education for children from Nursery through Primary 7 (ages 3–12).

== History ==
Ballumbie Primary School officially opened in April 2012 as a key part of the Whitfield area's regeneration project. The school was formed by the amalgamation of the former Whitfield Primary School, Newfields Primary School, and Whitfield Early Years Centre, combining them into a newly constructed, purpose-built campus.

== Overview ==
The school serves the Whitfield community in north-east Dundee. Education is delivered in accordance with Scotland's Curriculum for Excellence framework, focusing on literacy, numeracy, health, and wellbeing. The modern campus features open indoor learning spaces, natural lighting via skylights, and integrated nursery provisions for early years education.

== Secondary cluster ==
Ballumbie Primary School forms part of the Greenfield Academy educational cluster. Primary 7 pupils participate in structured primary-to-secondary transition programmes with Greenfield Academy prior to entering S1, which includes joint curriculum engagement and pastoral support. Previously, the school acted as a feeder for Braeview Academy, which closed in 2025 following a city-wide secondary school merger.

== See also ==
- List of schools in Dundee
