= Eastern Primary School =

Location
- Camperdown Street; Broughty Ferry, Dundee, DD5 3AE; Scotland; 56.469937°N 2.880335°W

Information
- Type: State primary
- Local authority: Dundee City Council
- Head teacher: Gordon Ferrier
- Gender: Mixed
- Capacity: 406
- Feeder to: Grove Academy

Eastern Primary School is a co-educational non-denominational state primary school situated in the Broughty Ferry area of Dundee, Scotland. Managed by Dundee City Council, it serves the local community, providing early learning and primary education for children from nursery age up to Primary 7.

== History and campus ==
Eastern Primary School has a notable history within Broughty Ferry. For nearly a century, the school operated from a grand, purpose-built Victorian premises located at the foot of Whinny Brae, which was officially opened in 1911. This original Category A listed building—celebrated for its steel-beam construction and striking Art Nouveau details designed by James H. Langlands and William G. Lamond—was closed as a school and subsequently converted into residential apartments in 2009.

Following the closure of the Whinny Brae site, Eastern Primary School relocated to its current location on Camperdown Street. The primary school took over the former buildings of Grove Academy, which itself had moved into a newly constructed, state-of-the-art campus nearby. Today, Eastern operates from this spacious Camperdown Street campus, incorporating both mainstream primary classes and a dedicated early years nursery provision.

== Secondary cluster ==
Upon completing Primary 7, pupils at Eastern typically transition to the nearby Grove Academy for their secondary education. The primary school maintains close ties with the academy, operating within the same cluster to ensure a seamless educational transition for students entering S1.

== See also ==
- List of schools in Dundee
- List of listed buildings in Dundee
