= Dens Road Primary School =

Location
- 77 Dens Road; Dundee, DD3 7HY; Scotland; 56.472934°N 2.970314°W

Information
- Type: State primary
- Established: 1911
- Local authority: Dundee City Council
- Head teacher: Daniel Albayati
- Gender: Mixed
- Capacity: 250
- Feeder to: Morgan Academy

Dens Road Primary School is a co-educational non-denominational state primary school situated in Dundee, Scotland. Managed by Dundee City Council, it serves the local inner-city community, providing early learning and primary education from nursery age through to Primary 7.

== History and architecture ==
The school building is a significant example of early-20th-century educational architecture and is designated as a Category B listed building by Historic Environment Scotland. Constructed between 1908 and 1909 and officially opened in 1911, the school was designed by James H. Langlands with assistance from prominent local architect William G. Lamond.

The two-storey symmetrical campus was built using hammer-dressed rubble with ashlar stone dressings and features distinctive Jugendstil (Art Nouveau) influences, particularly in the school's wrought-iron railings which were designed to resemble plant stamens. One of the most unique architectural features surviving on the campus is a circular, open-timber and rubble structure in the front playground, which was originally built as the air intake for the school's Victorian plenum heating system.

== Overview and ethos ==
Operating from its historic campus on Dens Road, the school functions as a major community hub for the surrounding neighbourhoods. The school integrates a dedicated nursery provision with its primary classes, focusing on creating a highly inclusive environment for its diverse pupil demographic.

Dens Road places a strong emphasis on pastoral care, community involvement, and student well-being. Its educational approach is underpinned by its five core school values: Happiness, Nurture, Aspiration, Respect, and Integrity, ensuring that pastoral support holds as much weight as academic progression. The school actively fosters relationships with local families and community groups to provide targeted support where needed.

== Secondary cluster ==
Upon completing their primary education at Dens Road, the majority of pupils transition into the secondary school system at Morgan Academy. The primary and secondary institutions coordinate structured transition activities to help students acclimate to the larger high school environment before entering S1.

== See also ==
- List of schools in Dundee
- List of listed buildings in Dundee
