= Barnhill Primary School =

Location
- Falkland Crescent; Broughty Ferry, Dundee, DD5 3SQ; Scotland; 56.478687°N 2.855079°W

Information
- Type: State primary
- Local authority: Dundee City Council
- Head teacher: Anne McGregor
- Gender: Mixed
- Capacity: 358
- Feeder to: Grove Academy

Barnhill Primary School is a co-educational non-denominational state primary school located in the Barnhill area of Broughty Ferry, Dundee, Scotland. Managed by Dundee City Council, it provides early learning and primary education for children from Nursery through Primary 7 (ages 3–12).

== Overview ==
The school serves the Barnhill and surrounding residential areas in Broughty Ferry, located in the east of Dundee. Education is delivered under Scotland's Curriculum for Excellence framework, focusing on literacy, numeracy, health, and wellbeing. The school complex includes main teaching blocks and an integrated early years centre for nursery provision.

== Secondary cluster ==
Barnhill Primary School forms part of the Grove Academy educational cluster. Primary 7 pupils participate in structured primary-to-secondary transition programmes with Grove Academy prior to entering S1, which includes joint curriculum engagement and pastoral support to prepare for secondary education.

== See also ==
- List of schools in Dundee
