= Forthill Primary School =

Location
- Fintry Place; Broughty Ferry, Dundee, DD5 3BE; Scotland; 56.474494°N 2.873015°W

Information
- Type: State primary
- Local authority: Dundee City Council
- Head teacher: Lorna Robertson
- Gender: Mixed
- Feeder to: Grove Academy

Forthill Primary School is a co-educational non-denominational state primary school situated in the Broughty Ferry area of Dundee, Scotland. Managed by Dundee City Council, it serves the local community and provides education from early years nursery through to Primary 7.

== Overview ==
The school operates from a large campus on Fintry Place, located near the Forthill Sports Club. Forthill functions as a comprehensive community learning space, incorporating both mainstream primary classes and a dedicated early years centre.

The school has a notable focus on science and technology education. In 2026, pupils from Forthill received top honours at the Dundee Lord Provost STEM Inspiration Awards, held at the Dundee Science Centre, for creating innovative conceptual designs regarding artificial intelligence and environmental sustainability. The school also promotes active travel initiatives, working closely with the council to improve pedestrian safety and reduce traffic congestion around the campus during morning drop-offs.

== Secondary cluster ==
Upon completing their primary education at Forthill, the vast majority of pupils transition to the nearby Grove Academy. Because Broughty Ferry operates with a high volume of primary students across several local feeder schools, Forthill coordinates specific transition days with Grove Academy staff to help pupils adjust to the much larger secondary campus environment before starting S1.

== See also ==
- List of schools in Dundee
