= 2022 Kirkton riot =

Civil unrest in Kirkton, Dundee, Scotland

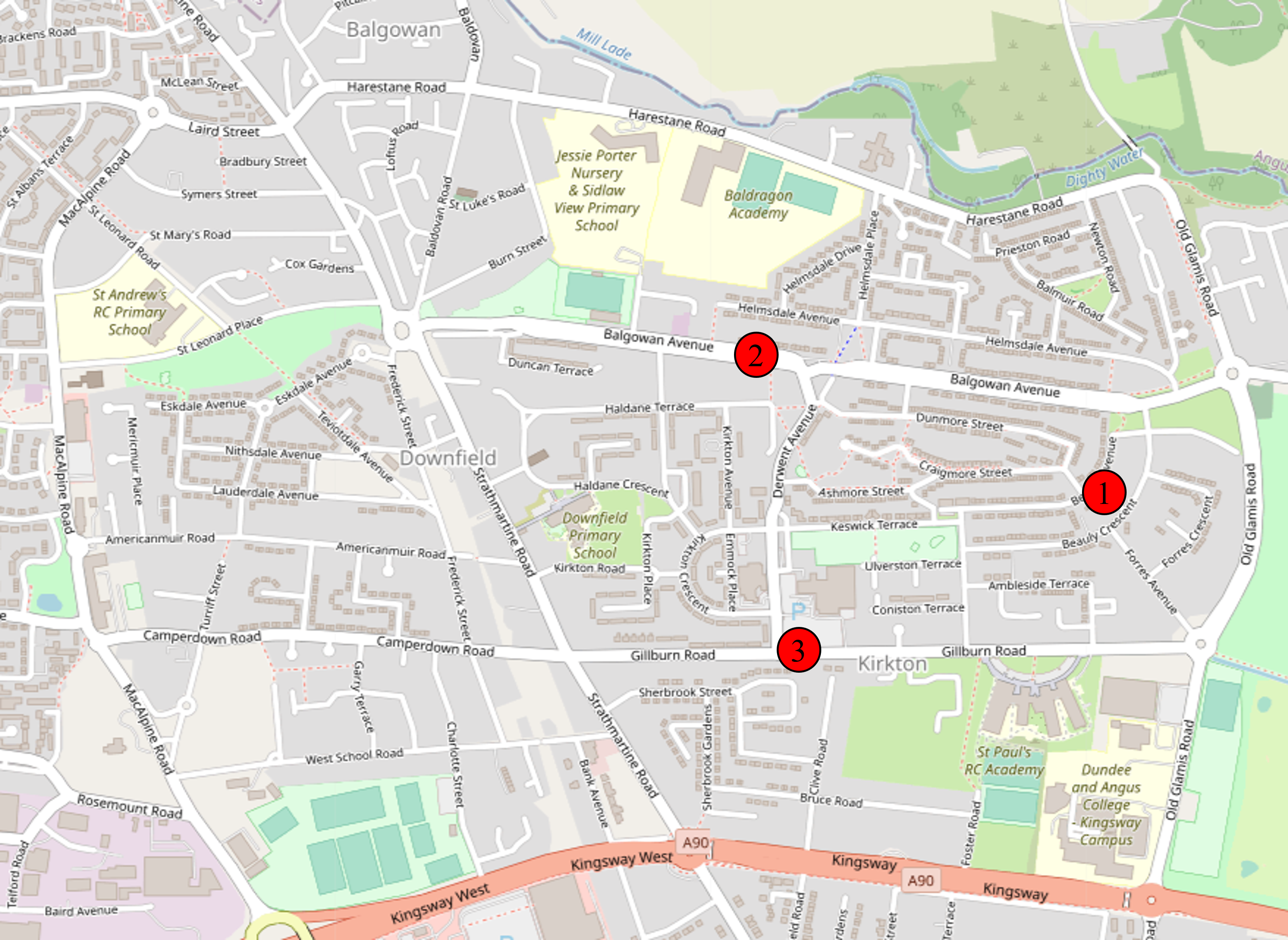
- (1) Beauly Square, where the riot broke out (2) Balgowan Avenue, where firebombs were thrown at officers (3) Gillburn Road, where St. Paul's R.C. Academy was vandalised and officers were targeted
- Date: 31 October 2022; 17:30 – 22:30 GMT
- Location: Kirkton, Dundee, Scotland
- Methods: Vandalism, firebombing, arson, physical violence

Casualties
- Injuries: 2
- Arrested: 1
- Charged: 33

The 2022 Kirkton riot took place in the area of Kirkton in Dundee, Scotland on 31 October 2022. The civil unrest occurred on several streets in the area during Halloween and was caused by a large group of youths.

== The riot ==
The riot broke out at 17:30 GMT in Beauly Square following anti-social behaviour. Speculation arose that the riot broke out following a remembrance event for Grant Hutchison, a man who lived in Kirkton who had died in 2020.

=== Beauly Square ===
It was reported that vehicles and bins were torched on Beauly Square as the riot began to roll out. Other items such as bikes were also torched as rioters stole items from houses in the area. Police and emergency services began to arrive on the scene shortly afterwards, but were largely outnumbered by the rioters.

=== Balgowan Avenue ===
Videos shared on social media showed rioters jumping and smashing car windows, youths setting numerous fires to Balgowan Avenue, the main road circulating through the area, blocking both ways as it was set alight. The nearby Old Glamis Road was also a target for rioters as bricks were thrown at cars and other vehicles.

Vehicles such as cars were also targeted with bricks being thrown at windows and motorcycles and bins were set alight with debris remaining until the following day. A police helicopter was later dispatched at 20:00 GMT and fire engines arrived to the scene following the initial outbreak of the riot where they remained in the following hours.

=== Gillburn Road ===
By 21:00 GMT, St. Paul's R.C. Academy was vandalised with windows being smashed open and cars being vandalised in the car park. Fireworks and firebombs were thrown to riot officers and emergency service officers who had arrived on the scene two hours prior, with one police officer receiving injuries. At 21:47 GMT, riot police tried to move rioters away from Gillburn Road.

Shops and restaurants in Kirkton were targeted by rioters and as a result, windows were boarded up and closed the following day.

The helicopter left the scene at 22:30 GMT after police managed to take control of the situation. No arrests were made during or the immediate aftermath of the riot however police stated that they would bring those responsible to justice.

== Aftermath ==
Police Scotland said that further police presence would be put in place for the days following the riot, up to and past Bonfire Night. Melted debris were later seen on roads throughout Kirkton the following morning.

A press release was published the following morning from Police Scotland updating the public, stating that enquires were ongoing to identify rioters.

On 1 November 2022, Scottish Labour MSP Michael Marra and Scottish Conservative MSP Maurice Golden submitted an urgent question to the Scottish Parliament following the riots, seeking clarity from the Scottish Government and question how such an event could be stopped in future.

As a result of the riot, several venues in Dundee cancelled their Bonfire Night displays. Dundee's annual fireworks display for Bonfire Night did not go ahead for the third year, with a local councillor stating "There is already enough rockets in the community to offset the ban of fireworks".

=== Firework ban campaign ===
Following the riot, Dundee City Council leader John Alexander called for supermarkets in Dundee to ban the public selling of fireworks. Supermarkets shortly after in Dundee banned the public selling of fireworks.

=== Investigation ===
On 1 November 2022, Scottish Government Justice Secretary Keith Brown confirmed that Police Scotland had launched an investigation to identify and prosecute those involved in the riot. Brown also faced calls to introduce a nationwide ban on public purchase of fireworks following the events after he condemned the riot.

On 3 November 2022, a teenager was arrested in connection with the riot.

On 6 November 2022, a 28-year old woman and a 15-year old teenager were charged following the riot.

On 27 October 2023, Police Scotland revealed that 33 people were charged following the riot.

=== Convictions ===
In November 2025, four men stood trial at Falkirk Sheriff Court in connection with the disorder that took place. After an eight-day trial involving more than 160 hours of CCTV evidence and testimony from 18 Crown witnesses, a jury convicted two men of breaching the peace. One man was found to have incited others during the disorder, while the other was found to have acted with others to throw fireworks and projectiles at police and members of the public, start fires in the area, damage property, and encourage others to join the unrest. Two additional men on trial were acquitted by verdicts of not proven.

Before the trial began, three men had already pled guilty to separate charges of breaching the peace in connection with the incident. Sentencing for all those convicted was deferred pending background reports.

Earlier in the proceedings, two men faced no further action after the court upheld no-case-to-answer submissions from their solicitors.

== Further disturbances ==
In both 2023 and 2024, further incidents took place in the same area.

In 2023, a disturbance took place once again on Beauly Avenue on 31 October, albeit a smaller scale, when a fire broke out. Riot police were deployed alongside fifteen police vehicles. Over 50 people were involved in the disturbance.

In the lead up to Halloween in 2024, eleven vacant houses were secured by police in Kirkton in preparation of any rioting breaking out. On the night of Halloween, bins were set alight in the area.

== Reactions ==
Dundee City Council leader John Alexander condemned the scenes from Kirkton. Alexander said that he'd never seen anything in the decades he lived in the area and compared the riot to scenes of a 'war-torn nation'. Many media outlets and users on social media compared the riots to the 2013 horror film, The Purge. A poster was created parodying the film which featured "The Purge: Kirkton".

Dundee City West MSP Joe FitzPatrick and Dundee City East MSP Shona Robison wrote a joint letter to the police commissioner following the incident.

Police Scotland condemned the incident and publicly stated that police presence would be tighter as a result of the riots. Several residents criticised Police Scotland's approach as they accused them of not responding to the situation sooner as no arrests were made during or in the immediate aftermath of the riot.

The Scottish Government's Justice Secretary Keith Brown described the riot as appalling and wholly unacceptable.

== In popular culture ==
The Kirkton riot was the subject of a 2023 documentary series produced by the BBC, Street Gangs.
