= DD postcode area =

Postcode area within the United Kingdom

Dundee
- Postcode area
- Coordinates: 56.543°N 2.855°W
- Country: United Kingdom
- Postcode area: DD
- Postcode area name: Dundee
- Post towns: 9
- Postcode districts: 11
- Postcode sectors: 52
- Postcodes (live): 8,967
- Postcodes (total): 11,305
- Statistics as at May 2020

The DD postcode area, also known as the Dundee postcode area, is a group of eleven postcode districts in eastern Scotland, within nine post towns. These cover Dundee and Angus (including Forfar, Arbroath, Brechin, Carnoustie, Kirriemuir and Montrose), plus part of north-east Fife (including Newport-on-Tay and Tayport) and small parts of Perth and Kinross and Aberdeenshire.

Mail for the DD postcode area is processed at Edinburgh Mail Centre, along with mail for the EH, KY, PH, FK and TD postcode areas.

== Coverage ==
The approximate coverage of the postcode districts:

Postcode district	Post town	Coverage	Local authority area(s)
DD1	DUNDEE	Most of the city centre, the University and the Riverside	Dundee
DD2	DUNDEE	The West of the city including Lochee, Blackness, Ninewells, Menzieshill, Charleston, Balgay, Ardler and Logie	Dundee, Perth and Kinross
DD3	DUNDEE	The northwest of the city including St Marys, Downfield and Kirkton, and the inner city areas of Strathmartine, Coldside and the Hilltown	Dundee, Angus
DD4	DUNDEE	The inner city area of Stobswell and Craigie, and the northeast of the city including Pitkerro, Douglas, Fintry and Whitfield	Dundee, Angus
DD5	DUNDEE	The east of the city including Broughty Ferry, Barnhill and Monifieth	Dundee, Angus
DD6	NEWPORT-ON-TAY	Newport-on-Tay, Wormit, Balmerino, Gauldry	Fife
DD6	TAYPORT	Tayport	Fife
DD7	CARNOUSTIE	Carnoustie	Angus
DD8	FORFAR	Forfar, Glamis, Letham	Angus
DD8	KIRRIEMUIR	Kirriemuir	Angus
DD9	BRECHIN	Brechin, Edzell	Angus
DD10	MONTROSE	Montrose, St Cyrus, Inverbervie, Hillside, Gourdon	Angus, Aberdeenshire
DD11	ARBROATH	Arbroath, Friockheim	Angus

== Map ==
DD postcode area map, showing postcode districts in red and post towns in grey text, with links to nearby AB, KY and PH postcode areas.

== See also ==
- List of postcode areas in the United Kingdom
- Postcode Address File
