= Craigie High School =

Secondary school in Dundee, Scotland

Craigie High

Location
- Garnet Terrace; Dundee, Dundee City Council, DD4 7QD; Scotland; 56.472507°N 2.923104°W

Information
- Type: Secondary School
- Established: 20 August 1970
- Closed: 2025
- Local authority: Dundee City Council
- Head Teacher: A. Waghorn
- Deputy Head Teachers: J. Gill; C. Thomson; C Meldrum; M Reid
- Staff: 59.8 FTE
- Gender: Mixed
- Age: 11 to 18
- Enrolment: 650
- Houses: Isla; Lomond; Skye; Nevis
- Colour: Black Gold
- Awards: Scottish Schools Ethos Award; UNICEF Right Respecting School Award Level 1
- School years: S1 – S6
- Contact no: 01382 431111
- Fax No: 01382 431130
- Website: http://craigiehighschool.ea.dundeecity.sch.uk/

Craigie High School (CHS) was a co-educational government funded High school situated in the city of Dundee, Scotland. The school is located within Craigiebank and has been serving the areas of Craigiebank, Douglas and Pitkerro for over 50 years. It closed in 2025 after a merger between the school and Braeview Academy was confirmed in January 2021.

== History ==
In November 1963, the Dundee Sub-Works Committee asked the Town Clerk to negotiate for the purchase of 12 acres of ground at Craigie Home Farm south as a site for a new secondary school. The contract was won by Charles Gray (Builders) at a total cost of £935,000.

Craigie High School first opened its doors to pupils on 20 August 1970, although some building work continued until the official opening on 11 December 1970 by Sir Garnet Wilson, former Lord Provost of Dundee and whom the street entrance of the school, Garnet Terrace, was named for.

When opened, the school was considered a major step forward in improving education in Dundee due it being the first purpose built comprehensive school in the city. For this reason, the school was featured in the local newspaper The Courier. As of 2019, Dundee City Council were considered replacing Craigie High and nearby Braeview Academy with a new school on the site of the former St. Saviour's High School, involving some of Craigie's pupils transferring to Grove Academy The merger was approved in 2021.

== Houses ==
The school operated a house system, which was assigned at the start of S1 (first year) and split between classes (2 classes per house). Pupils remained in the specified house for the remainder of their education at CHS, although house classes became mixed in preparation for the National Qualifications exams at the beginning of 4th year, the pupils still had one class a week with their house group held by their guidance teacher.

The houses were named Isla, Lomond, Skye and Nevis and were used with a points system during educational and physical competitions. Each house had a DHT assigned as House head and a teacher assigned as the Guidance teachers for the house.

== Awards ==
In 2011, Craigie High School was awarded the UNICEF Right Respecting School Award Level 1. Tam Baillie, Scotland's RRSA commissioner, presented the award to staff and pupils at the school.

In 2000 the school won the Scottish Schools Ethos Award.
