= Fintry, Dundee =

Area of Dundee, Scotland

Coordinates: 56.489131°N 2.940241°W

Fintry: Scottish Gaelic: Fionn Treabh
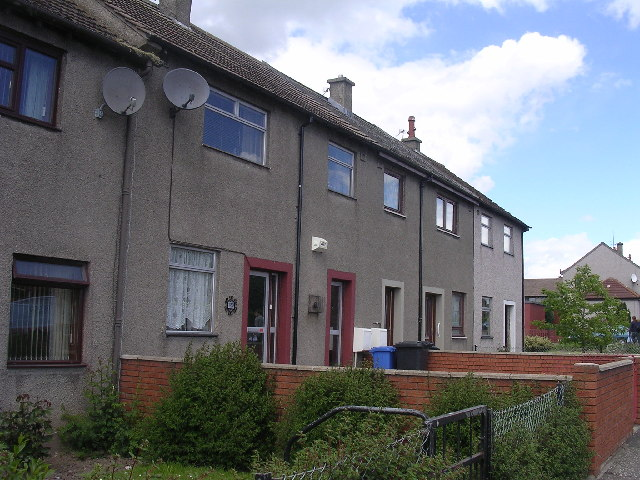
- Housing in Fintry

- Location within Dundee City council area Location within Scotland
- Population: 6,592
- OS grid reference: NO422334
- Council area: Dundee City
- Lieutenancy area: Dundee
- Country: Scotland
- Sovereign state: United Kingdom
- Post town: DUNDEE
- Postcode district: DD4
- Dialling code: 01382
- Police: Scotland
- Fire: Scottish
- Ambulance: Scottish
- UK Parliament: Arbroath and Broughty Ferry
- Scottish Parliament: Dundee City East

Fintry is a housing scheme in Dundee, Scotland. Fintry is located in the north of the city with Mill o' Mains to the west and Whitfield to the east. On the north, Fintry is bordered by farmland, including the Powrie Farm and Powrie Castle (from which one of the pubs in the area derives its name). Local parks include Powrie Park (at the north of the scheme) and Finlathen Park (in a deep valley to the south of the scheme, through which runs the Dighty Burn). Fintry had a population of 6592 in 2011.

Customarily, the borders of the scheme are accepted as being: Forfar Road on the west side with Mill O'Mains, Longhaugh Road on the east side with Whitfield and the Dighty Burn on the southern side (inside Finlathen Park). On three of the four sides, and (formerly) half of the north side (see section on Cheviot Crescent and Grampian Gardens), Fintry's borders are defined by three to four storey high tenement blocks.

Fintry is in the North East ward of Dundee City Council, represented since May 2012 by Councillors Steven Rome and Willie Sawers of the Scottish National Party, and Councillor Gregor Murray, who is an Independent.

Fintry has two bars, the Powrie Bar at Cheviot Crescent and the Dolphin on Fintry Road. Fintry also has two chip shops, two Chinese takeaways known as the Blue Lagoon and Friendlies, and three Indian takeaways, often referred to as the Tartan Tandoori, Mazaydar and the Red Chilli. There are two churches, Fintry Parish Church of scotland and Our Lady of Sorrows Roman Catholic Church. The 22nd Dundee Scouts operates from a hall in the grounds of Fintry Parish Church, and there is also a Girls' Brigade company in the church itself. Mains of Fintry Pipe Band was formed in Fintry in 1972, by Pipe Major William Smith.

Other facilities in the community include the Finmill Community Centre on Findcastle Street, and the Library also on Findcastle Street. Fintry is served by three Primary Schools: Fintry Primary (non-denominational, on Findcastle Terrace) and Longhaugh Primary (non-denominational) and St Francis (Catholic school), the latter two both part of the North East campus, opened in 2018, on Lothian Crescent. Fintry is in the catchment area for Braeview Academy Secondary School (non-denominational) and St. Paul's R.C. Academy (Catholic school). There is a Nursery School on the same site as Fintry Primary, and Quarry View nursery is part of the new North East campus on Lothian Crescent. The new Fintry Primary school was completed in around 2010, funded as a Public–private partnership, replacing a "temporary" building originally erected in the 1950s.

== History ==
Construction of the scheme began in the late 1940s; previously the area had been farmland. Two buildings from this time survive, one being a former farm cottage on Longhaugh Road which is in private ownership, the other being a farmhouse which now sits on Fintry Road and was until around 2010 the Fintry Nursery School. This building is owned by Dundee City Council, and is currently vacant (February 2015). At the time of construction, part of the plan was that all streets in Fintry would begin with the prefix "Fin". However, since the scheme was built there have been some deviations from this plan; all of these are detailed in the section below.

== Cheviot Crescent and Grampian Gardens ==
Cheviot Crescent (formerly Fincraig Street) and Grampian Gardens (formerly Fingarth Street) were renamed in the early 1970s due to their poor image (these two streets were blocks of densely populated tenements with a poor reputation and their names made it difficult for the council to attract new tenants into the flats).

Some time after their construction, surveyors found that the tenements had been built with inadequate foundations for the ground conditions, and were beginning to subside. After all the tenants were moved out to houses elsewhere in the city, almost the whole north side of Cheviot Crescent was demolished (two blocks were left standing at the east end of the street). Several blocks on the south side, and in Grampian Gardens, were also demolished.

Since these demolitions some limited rebuilding involving small bungalows has taken place on parts of the land formerly occupied by the tenements. Amond Way and Amond Gardens, built in the early 2000s, are named after the late PC Trevor Amond who was known in the area for his community work. These occupy land where nos. 7-12 Grampian Gardens once stood. Cheviot Rise is a small back street behind Cheviot Crescent, where the access road and part of the car parks were behind 45/47/49 Cheviot Crescent. Grampian Close is situated at the west end of Grampian Gardens.

== Notable people ==
- The Grahams of Fintry, local landowners until the 19th century
- Dundee F.C. and Scotland player Charlie Adam was born and grew up in Fintry.
- Former Dundee F.C. players Kyle Benedictus and Scott Robertson were both brought up in Fintry.
- Musician Brian Molko grew up in Fintry.
- Poet and author Gary Robertson resides in Fintry.

== Buses ==
From Fintry, you can get the following services:

Stagecoach Strathtay

- Service 22 to Dundee Seagate Bus Station or Kirriemuir (Note: Stops at one stop only in Fintry (Fintry, opposite Findowrie Street))

Xplore Dundee

- Service 10 to Ninewells Hospital or Broughty Ferry
- Service 17 to Ninewells Hospital via Dundee Whitehall Street or Whitfield (Note: Stops at one stop only in Fintry (Fintry, opposite Findowrie Street))
- Service 32 to Dundee Crichton Street
- Service 33 to Dundee Commercial Street or Whitfield

Moffat & Williamson

- Service 88 to Whitfield or Broughty Ferry
