= St Marys, Dundee =

Area of Dundee, Scotland

Coordinates: 56.493034°N 3.015049°W

St Mary's
- Location within Dundee City council area Location within Scotland
- OS grid reference: NO376339
- Council area: Dundee City
- Lieutenancy area: Dundee
- Country: Scotland
- Sovereign state: United Kingdom
- Post town: DUNDEE
- Postcode district: DD3
- Dialling code: 01382
- Police: Scotland
- Fire: Scottish
- Ambulance: Scottish
- UK Parliament: Dundee West
- Scottish Parliament: Dundee City West

St Mary's is in a residential area of Dundee, Scotland located in the extreme northwest of the city, to the north of Ardler and west of Kirkton. It is also bounded on the west by Downfield Golf Club, to the northwest by Clatto Country Park and to the north by Craigowl View.

The scheme was built on farmland during the late 1940s, 1950s and 1960s as part of the city's attempt to create new council housing for working-class Dundonians following the end of the Second World War. All of the scheme's streets, bar two on the periphery (listed below) begin with the prefix 'St'.

The area suffers from the same social and economic problem that plague some of the other housing schemes of Dundee, however the improvement of housing standards and the demolition of tower blocks in the Ardler/St Mary's region has improved the area.

== Education ==
St Mary's was once served by two primary schools, Macalpine Primary on Macalpine Road, and Brackens Primary on Laird Street (incidentally, the two streets in the scheme without the prefix 'St'). However, Macalpine, the largest primary in the area, was demolished in 2008, Brackens several years earlier, and a new school, Craigowl Primary, has been built on the land once occupied by Brackens.

== Transport ==
St Mary's is served Xplore Dundee's bus services 1 to Dundee City Centre and 10 to Ninewells Hospital or Broughty Ferry.

== Amenities ==
The scheme has recently witnessed the construction of a new, purpose built community centre on St Kilda Road (on 'The Green', land once occupied by St Kilda Park), which opened in 2008, costing £660,000. Residents of St Mary's have long complained of a lack of facilities for the area, and it is hoped this new centre will act as the hub of the community.

The Nine Maidens (Laird Street) is the one public house situated in St Mary's, although many of its residents also frequent the Admiral Bar and the Ardler Sports and Recreation Club (both to the south of the scheme on Camperdown Road), and Doc Stewart's (The Downfield Hotel) on Strathmartine Road. De Niro's fish and chip shop is located on St Giles Terrace, as are two convenience stores, a post office and a hairdresser. A Morrisons daily store is found on St Boswells Terrace.

The area is served, along with Ardler, by Dundee West FC, a football club for boys and girls ranging from eight to eighteen years old.

As previously stated, the scheme sits close to Clatto Country Park and Downfield Golf Course, but also Templeton Woods and Camperdown Park, picturesque settings enjoyed by generations of St Mary's residents. Situated on the extreme northwest of Dundee, the area's proximity to the open countryside affords its inhabitants the opportunity to experience a more natural, rural environment.

== Famous sons ==
Dundonian Author, Mick McCluskey was born in a tenement in St Mary and was schooled and apprenticed in the area. The esteemed poet and winner of the Witbread Prize for Poetry, Don Paterson was raised in St Mary's, as was former Dundee footballer and current Dundee United coach Steve Campbell. Former Glasgow Labour politician (now Respect Party) George Galloway once lived in the area.
