= Downfield, Dundee =

Area of Dundee, Scotland

Coordinates: 56.487815°N 2.993798°W

Downfield
- Location within Dundee City council area Location within Scotland
- Population: 5,690
- OS grid reference: NO389333
- Council area: Dundee City
- Lieutenancy area: Dundee
- Country: Scotland
- Sovereign state: United Kingdom
- Post town: DUNDEE
- Postcode district: DD3
- Dialling code: 01382
- Police: Scotland
- Fire: Scottish
- Ambulance: Scottish
- UK Parliament: Dundee West
- Scottish Parliament: Dundee City West

Downfield is a residential area located in the north of Dundee, Scotland, centred on the stretch of the Strathmartine Road between the Kingsway and the northern boundary of Dundee. The area is bordered by St Mary's and Ardler to the west, Kirkton to the east and Fairmuir to the south.

Downfield is sometimes considered to be part of the neighbouring areas, although Downfield is retained in the name of the local parish "Downfield South", and by the bus route which services the area. It also had a local railway station, Baldovan railway station, later known as Baldovan and Downfield railway station, on the former Dundee and Newtyle Railway.

== Education ==
There are two primary schools in the Kirkton/Downfield area. Downfield Primary and Sidlaw View. Also Baldragon Academy along with Kingspark Special School for children with learning difficulties. Though these are sometimes considered to be in the Kirkton area. A number of new schools have recently been built in and around the area as part of the Dundee Schools PPP project.

New School	Replaces
Downfield Primary	The old school building (now used by Dundee Council as Downfield house)
Craigowl Primary	Macalpine Primary and Brackens Primary
St Andrew's Primary	St Margaret's Primary and St Columba's Primary
St Paul's Academy	Lawside Academy and St Saviour's High

== Transport services ==
Downfield is in the North Terminus for 22 Bus Service Downfield to City Centre.

Historically, Downfield had a railway station and tram links.
