= Craigiebank =

Area of Dundee, Scotland

Craigiebank: Scottish Gaelic: Bruach Creagach; Scots: Craigiebank
- Location within Dundee City council area Location within Scotland
- OS grid reference: NO429313
- Council area: Dundee City
- Lieutenancy area: Dundee
- Country: Scotland
- Sovereign state: United Kingdom
- Post town: DUNDEE
- Postcode district: DD4
- Dialling code: 01382
- Police: Scotland
- Fire: Scottish
- Ambulance: Scottish
- UK Parliament: Dundee East
- Scottish Parliament: Dundee City East

Craigiebank is an area of eastern Dundee, Scotland. It borders three other areas of the city: West Ferry to the east, Pitkerro to the north, Baxter Park and East Port to the south-west.

The Craigiebank housing estate was planned in 1918 as a garden suburb of the city, designed by City Architect James Thomson. At the centre of the estate was to be a group of community buildings, including a church, a college, shops and sports facilities.

However, only Craigiebank Parish Church was built. It was designed in the Romanesque style by City Architect Frank Thomson and opened in September 1938. Before demolition in 2023, it consisted of a cruciform plan sanctuary with an adjoining rectangular plan church hall (the hall was opened in 1932 and was used for church services prior to the construction of the sanctuary). The sanctuary housed a fine pipe organ (now residing in Poland) installed by Rothwell in 1949; this came from a London church bombed in the Blitz, and probably dates from around 1890. A current project aims to construct a multi-purpose community building on the site of the former church grounds.

The High School of Dundee has its playing fields in the area.

Baron Guthrie of Craigiebank, former Chief of the Defence Staff, is descended from the owners of the "Craggy Bank" Farm which used to be on the site. There are several primary schools, including Craigiebarns Primary, in the area.

== Baxter Park ==
Baxter Park (56.472°N 2.951°W) is in the western part of Craigiebank. A £5 million refurbishment was completed at Baxter Park. Queen Elizabeth II presided over its official reopening in July 2007. In 2009, the park was awarded Green Flag status.

There have been security concerns about the park after a series of violent attacks. Measures considered to increase security have been CCTV cameras, more patrol officers and better lighting.
