= Ardler =

Area of Dundee, Scotland

Coordinates: 56.488°N 3.014°W

- Location within Dundee City council area Location within Scotland
- Population: 2,832
- OS grid reference: NO376333
- Council area: Dundee City
- Lieutenancy area: Dundee
- Country: Scotland
- Sovereign state: United Kingdom
- Post town: DUNDEE
- Postcode district: DD2
- Dialling code: 01382
- Police: Scotland
- Fire: Scottish
- Ambulance: Scottish
- UK Parliament: Dundee West
- Scottish Parliament: Dundee City West

Ardler is an area in the north-west of Dundee, Scotland, built on land previously owned by Downfield Golf Club. The housing scheme was completed in the late 1960s and originally included six 17-storey multi-storey blocks that formed the northern part of the scheme. These were demolished between 1995 and 2007 as part of a major programme of regeneration due to finish in 2011.

== History ==
=== Before the housing scheme ===
The origins of the name 'Ardler' are unclear, and certainly not to be confused with the village named Ardler in Perth and Kinross (near Coupar Angus and 15 miles (24 km) north-west of Dundee). The name can be found on maps in the 18th century as 'Airdlaw', which could mean that it was the settlement of the Aird family. On the other hand, 'aird' or 'erd' is Scots for earth, so could simply relate to the fact that where the housing scheme is now was once farmland. Ardler Cottages, Ardler ponds (feeding into the Gelly burn, which now runs underground through the middle of Ardler) and three fields once stood on the current site of Downfield Golf Course just to the west of the scheme. These cottages were part of the Camperdown Estate until the land was bought by Dundee City Council.

Just to the east of Ardler Cottages was more farmland which later became a 9-hole golf course, with the land rented from the Camperdown Estate. In 1932, with the land having been returned to agricultural use during the First World War, Downfield Golf Club was formed and the land remained a golf course until 1964.

To the south of and partly incorporating the area where Ardler presently stands was Blackshade, a post-World War II prefabricated housing development intended as a solution to the housing problems of the time, with rapid building needed to meet the demands of long housing waiting lists and those coming home from war. To the north was St Mary's, built in the 1950s, with the golf course in the land depression between the two with the Gelly Burn running through the middle.

=== The arrival of Ardler ===
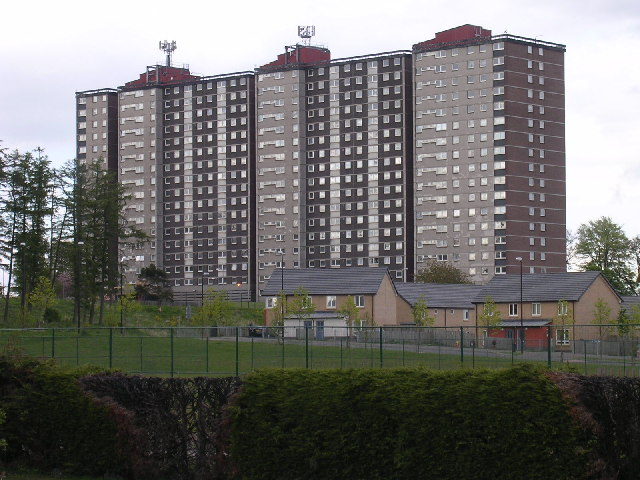
Seen here in 2005, this was the last of the six Ardler "multis" to be demolished. The other five blocks shared a very similar design.

In the 1960s the need for affordable housing was still apparent in Dundee, and the site of Downfield Golf Club was seen as an appropriate location. A land transfer between the Council and the Club saw the golf course move to its current location where Ardler Cottages and their fields once stood. The prefabricated houses on the site of the new development were demolished in the early 1960s, and the new scheme was built. On the south part of the site were 'courtyards', bungalows with an enclosed courtyard which offered some privacy, walk-ups and maisonettes, with shared entrances which may have been intended to further increase a community spirit, and in the north were the multi-storey blocks. Most were small, 2-bedroom houses, ideal for a first home or for small families, but less so for larger families. In all there were 1,177 house units and six multi-storey blocks containing 1,788 flats, making 2,965 new houses in total. Added to this were the 18 houses that were above the new shopping centre making, with remaining older housing, 3,254 houses on the estate. The homes were very desirable for those coming from Lochee and other parts of Dundee and many of the original residents were very pleased to have a house in Ardler. The scheme was provided with many facilities, mostly in the centre of the area, in an apparent attempt to create a strong sense of community. Yet for some residents there were almost two Ardlers, the houses in the southern half of the scheme and, on the hill overlooking them, the multis.

=== Decline ===
Ardler began to experience a decline particularly during the 1980s, and there were many reasons for this. People who had big families required larger houses. Middle aged couples whose families had grown up and left now looked towards smaller accommodation. The elderly who lived in the multis lived in fear of the vandals who were urinating in the lifts, drinking and using drugs and defacing the property. The lights on the landings were always being vandalised and this caused great distress to people who had to use the stairs when the lifts had been vandalised. Unemployment in Dundee was at a high level, and this worsened when the Timex factory, located next to Ardler and an employer of many Ardler residents, closed in 1993.

Allied to this was the declining standards of the housing itself. Since the scheme was built, some effort had been made to improve some of the housing, such as replacing some flat roofs with pitched roofs more able to resist the weather. However, the housing suffered from problems such as poor insulation and damp. The cheap, quick solution to the housing problems of the 1950s and 1960s proved also to be short-term, and when it was realised that refurbishing the buildings was financially not viable, the decision was taken to regenerate the area more fundamentally.

=== Regeneration ===
Ardler has undergone huge change since the mid-1990s, with the demolition of the first multi in 1995 and the old four-storey blocks of flats. The re-building of Ardler started in 1998 when a partnership of Sanctuary Scotland Housing Association, Wimpey Homes and HTA architects was selected by residents and Dundee City Council. Work started in January 2000 and is now 80% complete towards the target of creating 734 homes for rent, 69 refurbished homes and between 150 and 230 homes for private sale.

There is substantial open space in and around the village with new and innovative landscapes that include sustainable urban drainage systems, meadow and woodland areas. A priority for the regeneration of the Ardler Housing Estate included long-term strategies for social inclusion and community development. The Ardler Village Trust has been set up by local people and partners in the regeneration to help achieve this.

== Ardler and the surrounding area ==
=== Parklands and facilities ===
Ardler is fortunate in some ways regarding leisure pursuits. It is close to Templeton Woods where people can go for a walk and experience nature first hand. Many of those who grew up in Ardler in earlier years of the scheme took advantage of the greater freedom children had and would make good use of the woods as an area for playing and exploring. Camperdown Park is also within walking distance and has a great deal of space with a large children's play area near the bottom of the park, a children's zoo, a golf course and pitch and putt to name but some activities. There is also a cinema within walking distance.

Excursions into the surrounding area have not entirely stopped. In 1986, then ten-year-old Ardler resident Ross Prendergast made the news headlines when he ventured into the Camperdown Park zoo after hours. He got too close to Jeremy, the park's brown bear, who bit off the youngster's arm at the elbow.

=== The golf connection ===
Having been built on the site of the golf course, and with the Downfield Club still immediately west of the scheme, Ardler retained a strong connection with golf. Each of the three courts in all six multi-storey blocks were named after golf courses – some more famous and some more local than others. The streets were also named after golf courses (Turnberry (in Ayrshire), Dalmahoy (Lothian), Birkdale (Lancashire) and Rosemount (Perthshire)), with some of the multi's names used in the new streets built since the regeneration began (Gleneagles, Gullane, Hazlehead and Troon). Even the local pub in the north of the scheme was named the Fairways.

Courts in Ardler multis: Barassie (Ayrshire), Baberton (Lothian), Carnoustie (Angus), Cawdor (Lanarkshire), Downfield, Edzell (Angus), Ganton (Yorkshire), Gullane (Lothian), Gleneagles (Perthshire), Hazlehead (Aberdeenshire), Hoylake (Liverpool), Lindrick (Yorkshire), Murcar (Aberdeenshire), Pannal (Yorkshire), Prestwick (Ayrshire), Scotscraig (Fife), Troon (Ayrshire), Wentworth (Surrey).

The children in Ardler also did their part to keep the golf connection. In the 1970s a 9-hole 'golf course' was created by some of them, with holes marked by significant landmarks. The holes were named, and even had particular 'par' scores.

=== Transport links ===
One of the lessons learned when Ardler was first built was the need for good public transport. St Mary's had not had this when first built, and residents had to walk through the area where Ardler would be built (perhaps even over the golf course) in all weather to get to buses to go to work. Ardler is now served by a few bus routes, including one that goes down Turnberry Avenue in the centre of the scheme. Some residents, however, feel that they could be better served by public transport and that in some ways Ardler and St Mary's, as the north-west extremities of Dundee, are still the forgotten areas of the city.

== Life in Ardler ==
=== Leisure ===
As well as their self-created golf course, children in Ardler had access to other leisure facilities. Each of the six multis had its own play park for the children that incorporated swings, a chute and a sandpit, and there were other play parks among the walk-ups in the southern part of the scheme. There was also enough open space for the provision for football. This area was well used by school and junior league football teams particularly at the weekends, and during a match it could be difficult to move due to all the cars parked in the area. Currently there is a bowling club in Ardler, football pitches and multi-sport area.

=== Education ===
Two new primary schools were built in 1967 Ardler and St Fergus, a Catholic school. Originally there was confusion over the site, as St Fergus was built behind Chalmers Ardler Parish Church, a Church of Scotland. It was decided that they should be swapped round so that Ardler PS was closer to the church.

The local high school serving the area, although based in Kirkton, is St Pauls which is a newly built school where Lawside and St Saviors merged. The other Catholic high school in Dundee, St John's, is not far south of Ardler. Other students attend Baldragon Academy in Kirkton, which was a merger of Rockwell HS (where Ardler residents would formerly have gone) and Kirkton HS.

=== Local business and facilities ===
Turnberry Avenue runs through the centre of Ardler from Dalmahoy Drive in the west towards Macalpine Road in the east. This is the area which was earmarked for the shopping precinct and the Community Centre – built right in the centre of the scheme, with the clinic, schools and church – in what could be seen as an attempt to help create a community spirit.

The original Community Centre was located a few yards to the east of Blackshade Primary School. This was previously the Iona Street shops, which were knocked through to form the centre. There were many activities available to patrons but on Saturday afternoons it was specifically for the children with educational film shows, cartoons and games with prizes. The current Community Centre contains a library, a cafe, a gym and many other facilities which are extensively used by local residents, and also by people from much further afield.

In 1973 the shops were built in the centre of Ardler, bisecting Turnberry Avenue and closing it as a through-road, and included Templeton's Supermarket, a McColls newsagent, hardware store, hairdresser, Chemist, post office, council housing office, butcher, a Chinese restaurant and a fish and chip ship. There was also a Police Sub-Station and public toilets, which might suggest the expectation of numbers of non-resident shoppers in Ardler. Macalpine Shopping Centre on the road that forms the eastern boundary of Ardler was the other place nearby where residents could do their shopping and it had, and still has, an extensive range of shops. In the regenerated Ardler there are some new shops, including a small supermarket, on Turnberry Avenue - opposite the Community Centre, with the original aim of centrally located facilities to foster community spirit still very much in evidence.

There were public houses in the area also. The Fairways was situated between the westernmost two multi-storey blocks in the north and the Golden Pheasant was on Macalpine Road at the eastern edge of Ardler. There was also the Admiral, situated on Camperdown Road slightly further east, which is the one pub remaining.

== In popular culture ==
- In the 1997 game, Grand Theft Auto, one of the neighbourhoods in Liberty City is called Ardler, which named after the area in Dundee, where DMA Design (now Rockstar North) were based
