= Whitfield, Dundee =

Area of Dundee, Scotland

Coordinates: 56.488342°N 2.925606°W

Whitfield
- Location within Dundee City council area Location within Scotland
- OS grid reference: NO431333
- Council area: Dundee City
- Lieutenancy area: Dundee
- Country: Scotland
- Sovereign state: United Kingdom
- Post town: DUNDEE
- Postcode district: DD4
- Dialling code: 01382
- Police: Scotland
- Fire: Scottish
- Ambulance: Scottish
- UK Parliament: Arbroath and Broughty Ferry
- Scottish Parliament: Dundee City East

Whitfield is a social-housing scheme to the north of Dundee, Scotland. Building of the scheme started in the 1960s to accommodate Dundee's expanding population. Much of the housing was low rise, deck access flats, innovative for the time, built using the "Skarne" prefabrication system. The construction of the northernmost parts of the scheme, which were almost-exclusively Skarne blocks, continued into the early 1970s.

Between 1989 and 1995 it was one of the four areas chosen for the Scottish Office programme New Life for Urban Scotland. Much of the deck access housing in the area was demolished as the area was remodelled.

In the 2004 Scottish Index of Multiple Deprivation, Whitfield contained two datazones (average population 1,000) in the most deprived 15% of datazones in Scotland.

Whitfield had two high-rise tower blocks of flats, both constructed in 1969. In 2003, the tower block housing Quarryfield and Whitfield courts was demolished, and in 2004, the neighbouring tower block which housed Greenfield and Kellyfield courts followed. As of 2006. the area is undergoing redevelopment as part of a redevelopment plan and the area is seeing a rise in population.

== Education ==
There is one Secondary School in the Whitfield area - Greenfield Academy (Dundee), created after Braeview Academy and Craigie High School merged. There were formerly three Primary Schools within the area; Whitfield Primary School and Newfield Primary School, both of which merged in spring 2012 to become Ballumbie Primary School. There were an additional two primary schools in Whitfield named Greenfield Primary in the Aberlady Cres and Kellyfield both of these schools merged to become Newfields there was another school named Saint Mathews behind Dunbar Park. When this school closed it became Springfield private school until it was demolished.
