= Baldragon Academy =

School in Dundee, Scotland

Coordinates: 56°29′38″N 2°59′24″W

- Kirkton area of Dundee; Scotland

Information
- Established: 1960 as Kirkton High School; 1997 in merger with Rockwell High School; New buildings opened 2018

Baldragon Academy is a six-year comprehensive in the Kirkton area of the city of Dundee, Scotland. It was originally named Kirkton High School until merging with Rockwell High School in August 1997. The school is set in over 20 acres (8.1 ha) of its own grounds.

The school has around 1000 pupils and serves the Kirkton, Trottick, St Mary's and Ardler areas of Dundee. This area consists of a mixture of authority and privately owned housing. The feeder primary schools are Sidlaw View, Downfield, Craigowl, Ardler and Strathmartine Primary Schools.

== Naming ==
Dundee City Council Education committee asked the joint School Board to choose a new name for the school. Two names were chosen Baldragon and Craigowl (from Craigowl Hill – this was subsequently chosen as one of the House names) and Baldragon being the name for the area in The Legend of the Nine Maidens Well. The pupils were asked to vote for their preference and the overwhelming choice was Baldragon Academy.

== Houses ==
Baldragon Academy has four Houses named after prominent hills in the local area: Balgay, Craigowl, Kinpurnie and Law. The Houses are represented by a colour, green for Balgay, purple for Craigowl, blue for Law and silver for Kinpurnie. These colours are also used on the Junior school tie.

== BBC Radio Scotland "SoundTown" ==
Baldragon Academy was chosen to be the BBC Radio Scotland "SoundTown" school for the session 2007-2008. The school was provided with a fully operational radio studio and has been involved in numerous broadcasts and projects throughout the year-long project. Over 400 pupils took part in the project and it was hoped that all staff and pupils will have played a part in this project by the end of the session. The school has its own radio station, BBG1, which broadcasts every year for 2–3 days at a time. The school is also working with the radio station Bridge fm.
