= Douglas, Dundee =

Area of Dundee, Scotland

Coordinates: 56.478605°N 2.905886°W

Douglas: Scottish Gaelic: Dùghlas; Scots: Douglas
- Location within Dundee City council area Location within Scotland
- Population: 7,404
- OS grid reference: NO443322
- Council area: Dundee City
- Lieutenancy area: Dundee
- Country: Scotland
- Sovereign state: United Kingdom
- Post town: DUNDEE
- Postcode district: DD4
- Dialling code: 01382
- Police: Scotland
- Fire: Scottish
- Ambulance: Scottish
- UK Parliament: Dundee East
- Scottish Parliament: Dundee City East

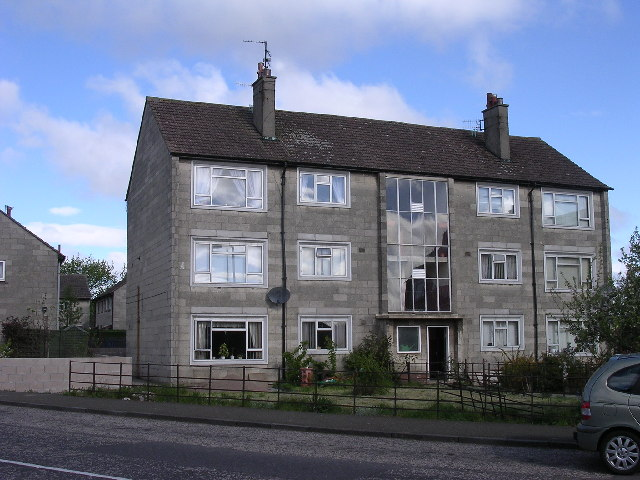
Housing in Douglas

Douglas and Angus (commonly referred to as Douglas) is an area of Eastern Dundee, Scotland. It is located between Whitfield to the North and Broughty Ferry to the East.

In the eastern part of Douglas is the distinctive Michelin Tyre factory which was the first factory in the U.K. to produce tyres by using energy from wind power. The two tall wind turbines on the factory site can be seen from many places around Dundee and the surrounding area.

== Education ==
Schools include Claypotts Castle Primary School, which opened in 2008.

== Buses ==
The following bus services operate from Douglas:

=== Xplore Dundee ===
- Service 10 to Ninewells Hospital or Broughty Ferry
- Service 28 to Myrekirk Asda via Dundee Whitehall Street

=== Moffat & Williamson ===
- Services 78A/78C to Dundee Whitehall Street or Monikie
- Service 88 to Whitfield or Broughty Ferry

=== Ember ===
Service E10 to Dundee Science Centre, with connections to Edinburgh and/or Glasgow without a change of bus. (Note: all further information on official bus company website)

This is a limited stop service; in and near Douglas, this stops only at the Michelin Scotland Innovation Park on Baldovie Road and outside Sainsbury's. If you get on at Sainsbury's, you must pre-book at least 10 minutes before the scheduled time for the 'bus.

== Places of worship ==
Places of worship in Douglas include St. Pius X Roman Catholic Church in Balerno Street and Douglas Parish Church (Church of Scotland) in Balbeggie Pl, Dundee DD4 8RD.
