= Kirkton, Dundee =

Area of Dundee, Scotland

Coordinates: 56.487867°N 2.987304°W

Kirkton: Scottish Gaelic: An Clachan; Scots: Kirktoun
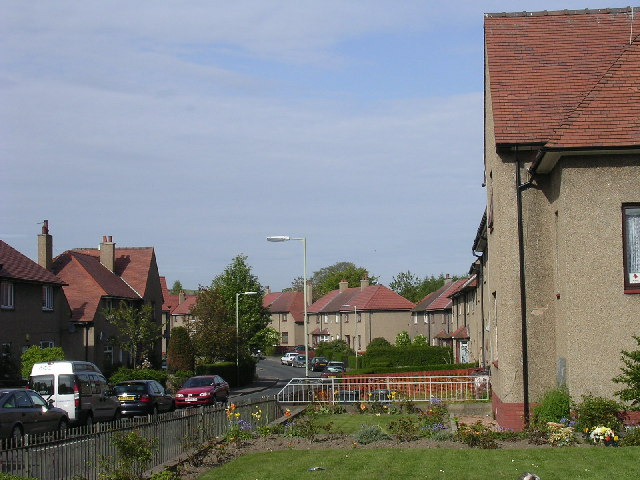
- A street in Kirkton

- Location within Dundee City council area Location within Scotland
- Population: 5,712
- OS grid reference: NO393333
- Council area: Dundee City
- Lieutenancy area: Dundee
- Country: Scotland
- Sovereign state: United Kingdom
- Post town: DUNDEE
- Postcode district: DD3
- Dialling code: 01382
- Police: Scotland
- Fire: Scottish
- Ambulance: Scottish
- UK Parliament: Dundee West
- Scottish Parliament: Dundee City West

Kirkton is a residential housing scheme located in the north of Dundee. The area is bordered by Downfield to the west, Trottick to the east and Fairmuir to the south.

== Background ==
=== Education ===
There are two primary schools in Kirkton; Sidlaw View and Downfield Primary. There are also two secondary schools in Kirkton; Baldragon Academy and St. Paul's RC Academy. The Kingsway Campus of Dundee College is located in the South of Kirkton

== Transport ==
The following bus services run from Kirkton:

Xplore Dundee

- Service 10 to Ninewells Hospital or Broughty Ferry
- Service 18 to Claverhouse or Dundee Albert Square

Stagecoach Strathtay

- Service 21D to Dundee Seagate Bus Station or Forfar

Moffat & Williamson

- Service 202 to Dundee Post Office

=== History ===
A riot took place in Kirkton on 31 October 2022 which injured a handful of people and saw the use of fireworks being banned from supermarkets in Dundee following the riot.
