= Harris Academy =

Location
- Perth Road; Dundee, DD2 1NL; Scotland; 56°27′22″N 3°00′32″W

Information
- Type: Comprehensive
- Motto: Spe et labore By hope and work
- Established: 31 August 1885
- Founder: William Harris
- Local authority: Dundee
- Rector: Barry Millar
- Staff: 147 (as of 2025/26)
- Gender: Mixed
- Age: 11 to 18
- Enrolment: 1,401 (as of 2025/26)
- Houses: Birnam; Cawdor; Forres; Kinloch
- Colours: Maroon, Gold, Black
- Website: http://harrisacademy.ea.dundeecity.sch.uk/

Harris Academy is a co-educational comprehensive school in the residential area of West End of Dundee, Scotland. Harris Academy was founded in 1885 and is the oldest state school in Dundee. Previously academically-selective, it became a comprehensive school in August 1973.

Harris Academy is also the second-largest state run school in Dundee in terms of number of pupils and the school campus building after Greenfield Academy, and is known for being one of the most successful schools in Dundee and Scotland by record of attainment and exam result successes which are considered 'well above average'.

Over the course of its history, Harris Academy has been housed at three locations across the city in Park Place, Perth Road and Lawton Road temporarily, with its permanent campus based on Perth Road.

== Admissions ==
The school is situated in the west of Dundee, north of the railway line, the A85 and Dundee Airport. The University of Dundee Botanic Garden is nearby to the west.

=== List of rectors ===
Tenure	Rector
1885-1909	James Brebner
1909-1930	James B. Robb
1930-1950	Alexander Peterkin
1950-1969	A.E. Hope
1969-1985	James Hamilton
1985-1997	Andrew Johnstone
1997-2015	James Thewliss
2015-2016	Angela White (acting)
2016–present	Barry Millar

== Houses ==
Harris Academy has a house system that allocates each pupil to one of four houses, named Birnam, Cawdor, Forres and Kinloch. The former three come from houses in William Shakespeare's "Macbeth". The latter comes from the name of George Kinloch, former MP and reformer in Dundee and from the village of Kinloch. Each of the houses has an associated colour, Birnam - Red, Cawdor - Yellow, Forres - Green, Kinloch - Blue. Each house competes against each other in Interhouse competitions; both sporting and academic. They receive points for their success, and at the end of the year, the points are totalled to declare the winner of the house championship. No house was awarded in the 2020–21 session as a result of the COVID-19 pandemic.

House	House championships won
Birnam	2013–14, 2014–15, 2017–18, 2022–23, 2023–24
Cawdor	2016–17, 2024–25
Forres	2004–05, 2007–08, 2019–20
Kinloch	2002–03, 2003–04, 2004–05, 2005–06, 2006–07, 2008–09, 2010–11, 2011–12, 2012–13, 2015–16, 2018–19, 2021–22

== History ==
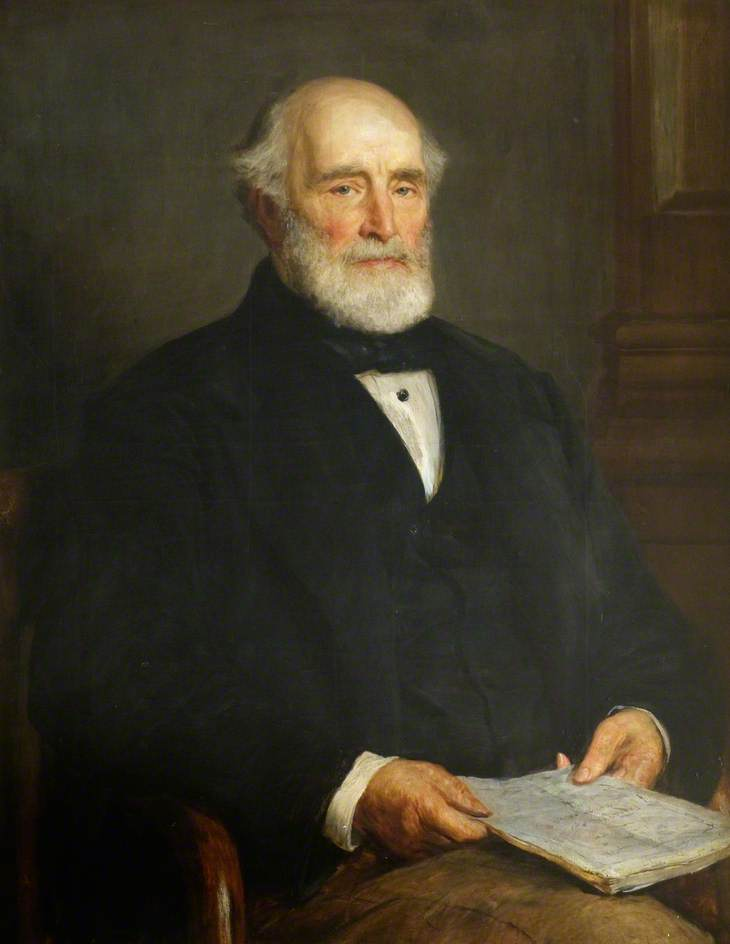
William Harris (pictured) founded Harris Academy but died in 1883 before the school opened in 1885.

Harris Academy was established on 31 August 1885 through a bequest from corn-merchant and mill owner William Harris. The original building was in Park Place designed by Dundee architect James Ireland. William Harris had died in March 1883, two years before the opening of the new school.

The school's first rector was James Brebner and on the first day of the new school, approximately 1,035 pupils were enrolled. By 1888, the school population increased to 1,500 and continued to grow which breached the original building's capacity. With Morgan Academy opening in 1888, pressure on the school population eased.

A fire broke out in the school in 1912 and damaged several classrooms and questions were raised on whether the school was suitable enough to continue operating and whether a new school should be replaced but was initially rejected. Plans for an extension to the Park Place building was considered but a replacement school building was later granted and it would be built on a new site rather than the existing site at Park Place.

A replacement school was designed by Patrick Thoms in 1926, taking several years to complete: the school moved to its present site on Perth Road on 21 April 1931.

Harris Academy was a selective secondary school until it became a comprehensive in 1973. The last intake to its Primary Department was in August 1955.

Harris Academy moved to Lawton Road in 2013 as its former Perth Road building was revamped. On 22 June 2015, Dundee City Council voted to close Menzieshill High School and amalgamate the two schools. Pupils from Menzieshill High School transferred to Harris Academy in 2016 when the new Perth Road building was completed. 18 councillors voted in favour for Menzieshill High School to close with 14 councillors against the closure.

By the early 2020s, Harris Academy became the most populated secondary school in Dundee, with an intake of 1,345 pupils as of 2022, which by September 2023, had a capacity percentage of 103%. As a result, an extension to the 2016 Perth Road building was approved to be built at the southern end of the school campus, construction started in 2022 and was finished by the 2023-24 term. This new extension has increased Harris Academy's capacity number to 1,500, cementing its position as the largest public school in Dundee.

== Buildings and grounds ==
=== Park Place building (1885–1931) ===
Harris Academy's original building was located at Park Place in Dundee which opened on 31 August 1885. The Park Place building officially opened on 2 September 1885.

Due to the popularity of the school by more pupils joining Harris Academy, the Park Place building was too small for pupils to fit and therefore moved to Perth Road.

=== Former Perth Road building (1931–2013) ===
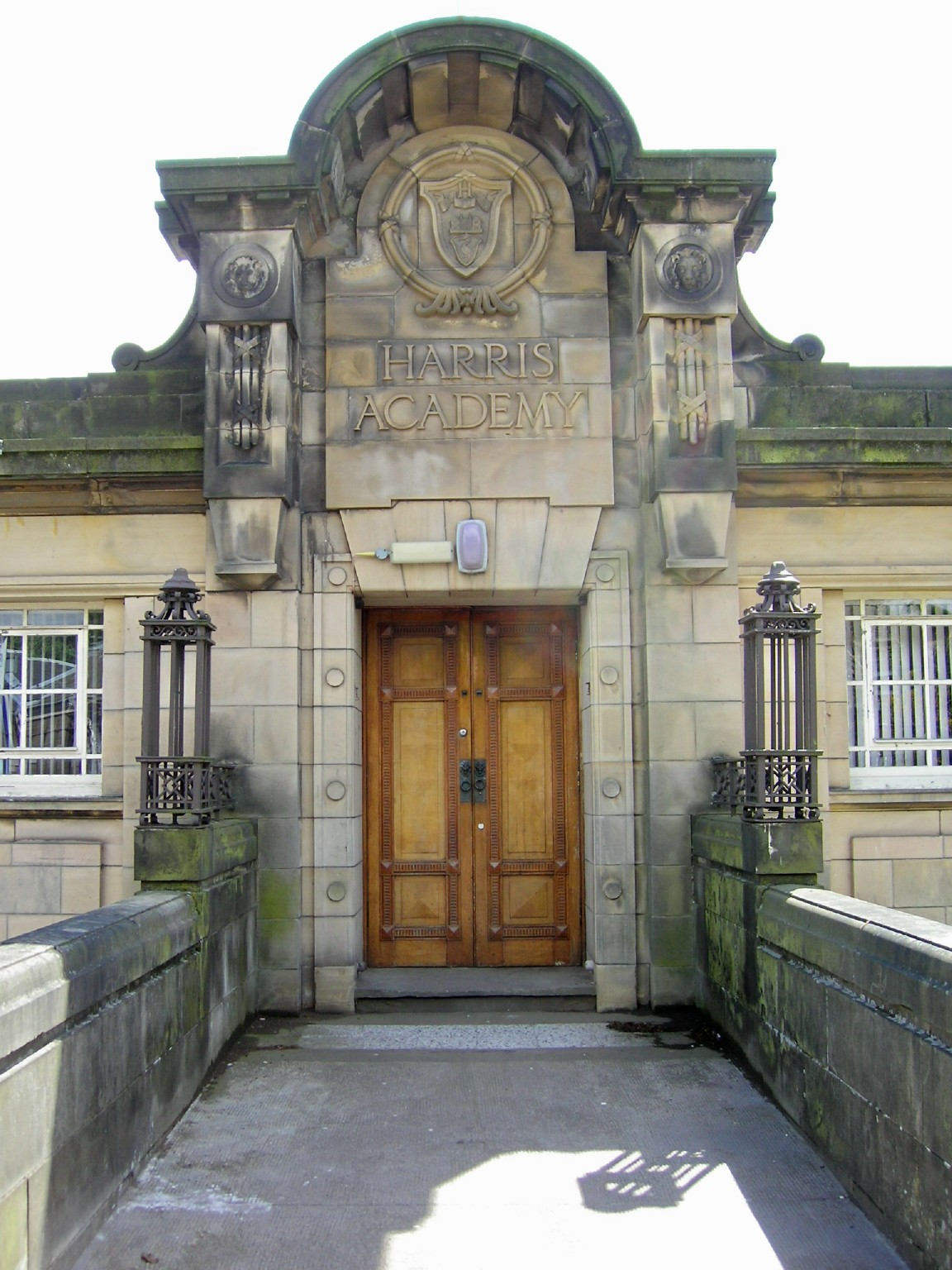
Harris Academy's façade at the former Perth Road building

The main building was built in 1931 after the school population outgrew the previous Park Place building and was officially opened by Sir James Irvine, principal of St. Andrews University on 1 May 1931.

The former Perth Road building housed the Modern Languages department, the Social Subjects departments, the Science departments, The Religious Education department, the Craft and Design department, the Mathematics department, Assembly Hall, the Guidance base, Year-Heads' offices, and the Rector's office.

The Crawford Lodge annex to the west of the main school was purchased by the Town Council in 1946 as an extension to the school. Classics and modern languages were taught there. It was burnt down in 1958 and remained a shell until it was replaced by the new buildings in the late 1960s. This housed the Computing and Business Studies departments, the Home Economics department, the English department, the Art department, the school library, the careers base, the Dining hall, two of the three gyms, and the school's swimming pool.

In addition to these there was also a Music Block housing the Music department with rooms for music tuition; and a substantial Games Hall building with a fitness room. These buildings were also demolished alongside the main school building in 2013.

The school has access to a wrought-iron footbridge over the Dundee-Perth railway line to playing fields at the Riverside.

Not far from the school are the school sports grounds at Elliot Road. These include a pavilion, a rugby pitch and several football or hockey fields. In summer time, it is converted to Athletics tracks.

==== Blackness Road Annexe (1974–1998) ====
In the late 1970s the school experienced a boom in numbers, as a result of its conversion from a Senior Secondary School to a comprehensive school (it was never known as a 'grammar school'). In addition to its Perth Road buildings, Harris Academy took over the premises of Logie Junior Secondary School on Blackness Road, Dundee.

The school was split with 1st and 2nd years attending Harris Academy in the Blackness annexe, 3rd to 6th Years continued at the Perth Road building. Mini-buses provided transport for staff between the two locations by Red Line Coaches. Use of the annexe ceased in 1998, and following a fire that caused extensive damage to the now-vacant school in 2001, the former Logie/Annexe building was demolished.

==== Closure of Perth Road building ====
Harris Academy moved to new temporary premises, at the old Rockwell High School building on Lawton Road on 15 August 2013, remaining there until August 2016 while the new Harris Academy was being built at the Perth Road site.

On the evening of 15 September 2013, a fire broke out at the vacant former Perth Road building while it awaited demolition. A few classrooms on the first and middle floor suffered. The fire was put out quickly by fire crews from three Dundee fire stations. The fire brigade, who investigated the fire, were of the opinion that the fire was started deliberately, probably by youths.

=== New Perth Road building (2016) ===
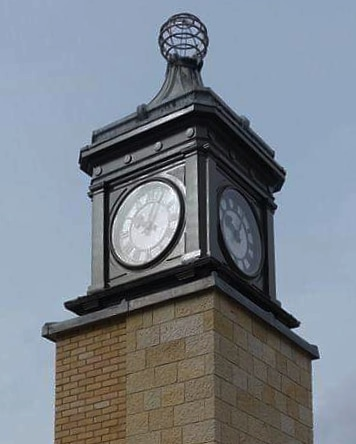
Harris Academy's clock tower at the new Perth Road building on a plinth made out of the foundations of the 1960s building on the left and the former games hall on the right.

The new Harris Academy building was a £31 million project. The new Harris Academy building was completed in early 2016, and the move from Menzieshill High School was completed by August 2016. The new building was officially opened by Deputy First Minister John Swinney on 7 December 2016.

When Harris Academy moved to Perth Road in 1931, a clock tower was built at the front of the original 1930s building. The new Harris Academy retained the clock tower that was put in storage during the construction of the new school building. The clock tower was renovated, painted and later retained on a platform at the eastern side of the school campus. The platform that the clock tower stands on was built from the foundations of the former games hall and the 1960s extension from the former Perth Road building.

The original Harris Academy facade was built at the front of the original Perth Road building in 1931. The facade was built as a main entrance to the building from the 1930s until the 1960s when an extension with other entrances were built.

During the construction of the new Harris Academy, the facade was put in storage along with the clock tower and once the new building was completed, the original facade was retained at the reception area of the new school.

In 2021, an extension to the school was proposed which would be located at the rear of the main building which would have six extra classrooms, boosting the school's capacity from 1,300 to 1,500.

The proposals for an extension to the school came as a result of concern that the school would be overcapacity at the start of the 2023-24 school term. In August 2022, the proposals were approved and the extension is due to be built by the 2023-24 school term. The new extension opened on 20 November 2023.

== See also ==
- Harris Academicals RFC
