= Braeview Academy =

Coordinates: 56.4937°N 2.9154°W

Location
- Berwick Drive; Whitfield, Dundee, DD4 0NL; Scotland

Information
- Founded: 1976
- Closed: 2025
- Rector: L. Elder
- Senior Depute Rector: K. Clarkson
- Staff: 64.3 FTE
- Gender: Mixed
- Age: 11 to 18
- Enrolment: 595
- Houses: Law McManus Discovery
- Colours: Burgundy, Yellow, Blue, Green
- Eco Schools Scotland: Silver Award
- School Years: S1-S6
- Website: http://braeview.ea.dundeecity.sch.uk/

Braeview Academy was a secondary school in Dundee, Scotland. Situated on top of a steep hill (brae), it was originally named Whitfield High School. when it opened doors in 1970.

The last headteacher of Braeview Academy prior to its close was Mrs Elder. The three values of Braeview Academy were Ambition, Responsibility and Safety. The three house groups in Braeview Academy were Law, McManus and Discovery. These were based on famous landmarks in the city of Dundee.

The school was damaged in a fire on 11 September 2018, This led to pupils being situated within other schools in the city for a brief period of time. Eventually they were resituated back to the original site which had Portakabins installed throughout with the majority of the main building destroyed. Some sections of the original building like the Science, Design, Art and PE were still suitable to be used within their usual buildings. Although after several inspections the school was consistently deemed unsuitable.

This led to a decision made in 2021, when Dundee City Council decided to merge Braeview with the nearby Craigie High School with a new community campus on the site of the former St Saviour's High School called Greenfield Academy. This led to the closure of Braeview Academy at the end of the 2024/2025 school session. Braeview will be remembered as a school which had a lasting impact on those who attended.

== Houses ==
The school was divided into three main houses: McManus, Law and Discovery. Each house was served by a Depute Rector, and also House Captains which were chosen every year.

- McManus: House Colour: burgundy, Head of House: Mr Clarkson
- Discovery: House Colour: blue, Head of House: Mrs Telfer
- Law: House Colour:blue, Head of House: Mrs McPherson

== Former pupils ==
- Charlie Adam, footballer for Dundee FC
- Garry Kenneth, footballer
- John McGlashan (footballer), born 1967
- Eddie Mair, broadcaster
- Scott Robertson
