= Greenfield Academy (Dundee) =

Secondary school in Dundee, Scotland

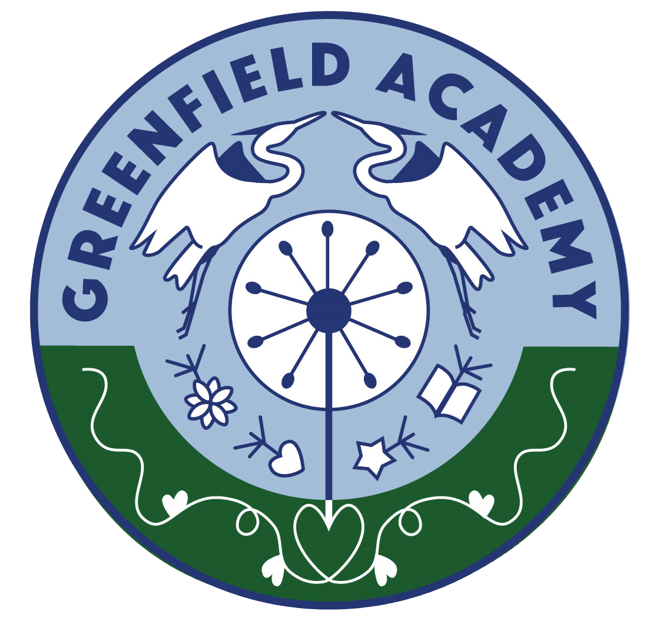

Location
- Drumgeith Road; Dundee, Dundee City Council; Scotland

Information
- Type: Secondary School
- Established: 22 August 2025
- Local authority: Dundee City Council
- Head Teacher: Johnny Lothian
- Deputy Head Teachers: TBA
- Enrolment: 1,500
- Houses: Baxter; Caird; Dawson; Monikie; Slessor

Greenfield Academy is a secondary school in Dundee, Scotland. It opened in August 2025 as part of the £100 million Drumgeith Community Campus, accommodating up to 1,500 pupils, becoming the largest public school in the city. The school was formed from the merger of Braeview Academy and Craigie High School.

== History ==
Plans for the new school were first announced by Dundee City Council in response to ageing school buildings and the need for modern facilities in the city. Braeview Academy and Craigie High School were selected for merger, with the new school constructed on the Drumgeith site.

The name “Greenfield Academy” was chosen to symbolise growth and community, referencing both the site’s historical Greenfield House and the green spaces surrounding the campus.

Greenfield Academy officially opened to pupils in late August 2025, with the first full day of teaching taking place on 22 August 2025.

== Campus ==
Greenfield Academy is located within the Drumgeith Community Campus, a major education and community development project in Dundee. The campus features a state-of-the-art school building, an international-sized rugby pitch, a full-sized football pitch as well as classrooms and specialist learning spaces.

The campus is also intended to serve the wider community, with facilities used for evening youth engagement, sports programmes, and other activities.

The academy has capacity for up to 1,900 pupils, making it one of the largest schools in Dundee.

== Houses ==
There are five houses in Greenfield Academy: Baxter, Caird, Dawson, Monikie and Slessor, all named after parks in the city and the local area.

== See also ==
- List of schools in Dundee
- Braeview Academy
- Craigie High School
