= Morgan Academy =

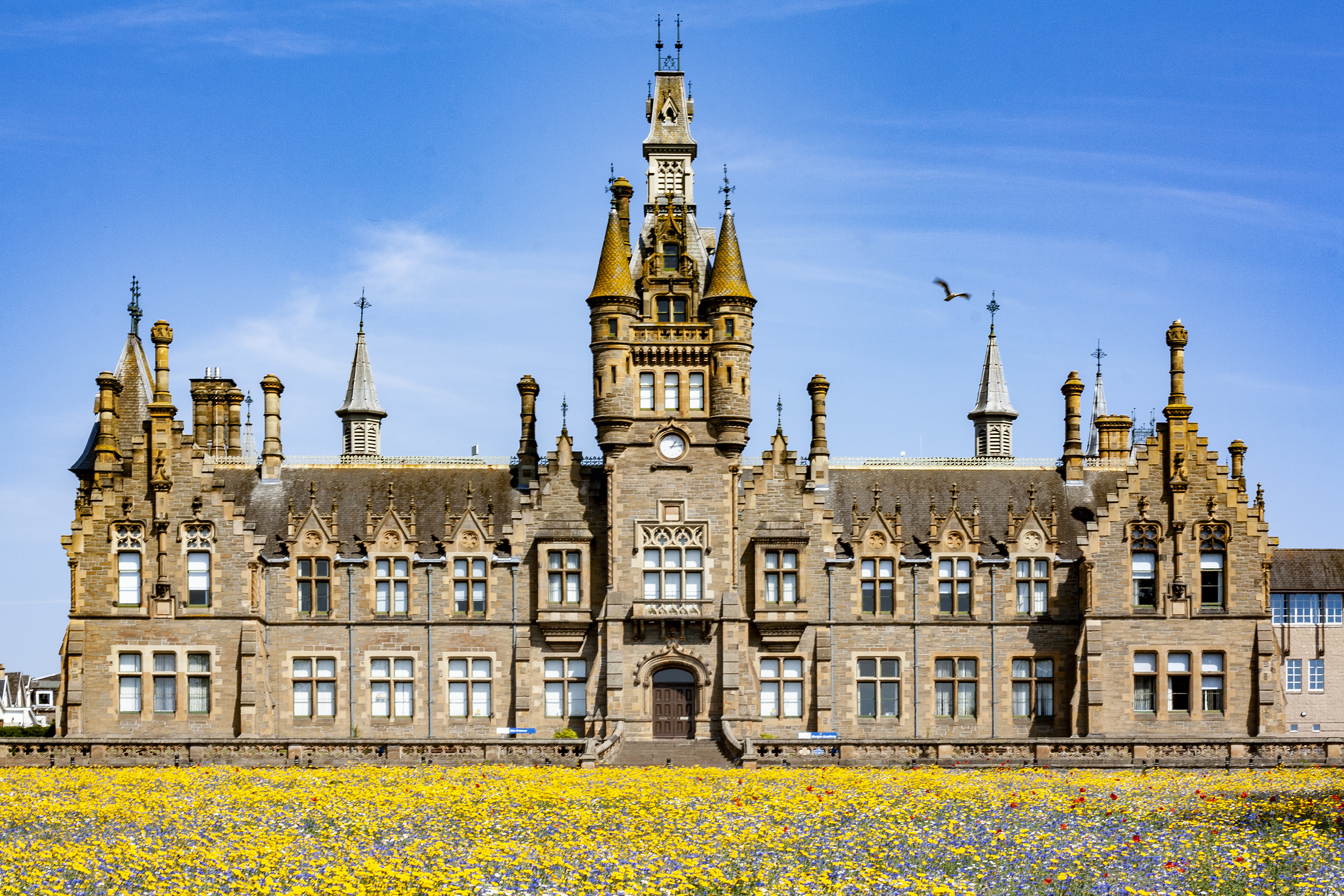

Location
- Forfar Road; Dundee, Angus, DD4 7AX; Scotland; 56.47469°N 2.95407°W

Information
- Motto: Sufficit Deus (God is enough)
- Established: 1889
- Founder: John Morgan
- Local authority: Dundee City
- President: Quinn Green
- Head Teacher: Gregor McBain (as of 2024)
- Enrolment: 934 (19/06/2019)
- Website: http://morgan.ea.dundeecity.sch.uk

Morgan Academy is a secondary school in the Stobswell area of Dundee, Scotland. Morgan Academy was founded in 1889 and is the second oldest state school in Dundee behind Harris Academy.

== History ==
The building was designed in 1862 by the Edinburgh architects John Dick Peddie and Charles Kinnear, opening in 1866 as the Morgan Hospital, a charitable institution providing accommodation and education for "sons of tradesmen and persons of the working class generally whose parents stand in the need of assistance".

In 1888, Morgan Hospital closed and a year later in 1889, the school opened as Morgan Academy, often referred to by alumni as "The Morgan" or simply "Morgan", with various alterations, including roofing over the courtyard as a hall. The architecture is designated as a Category 'A' listing by Historic Scotland.

Its benefactor was John Morgan, the son of a Dundee maltman, who emigrated to India at the age of 20 where, with his brother, he became a wealthy indigo farmer. Upon his death in 1850 he bequeathed much of his fortune to establish a residential institution. The hospital closed in 1888 and was bought by the members of the Dundee Burgh School Board, who re-opened it as a school.

Until the advent of comprehensive education in the late 1960s and early 1970s, there were mainly two types of high school in Scotland: junior secondaries where students left school at 16 and began preparation for one of the trades or entered the workforce, and academies where students remained until the end of fifth or sixth year and took highers before normally going to college or university. Morgan functioned in the latter category.

Morgan Academy later became a comprehensive school in 1972, although the school was still called an academy rather than a high school.

The school suffered a fire on 21 March 2001 which destroyed much of the building. It was rebuilt using the original facade and much of the internal appearance. The newly rebuilt Morgan Academy was re-opened in November 2004, by then Minister for Education and Young People Peter Peacock MSP. A portrait of John Morgan, found in the basement of the McManus Galleries, was unveiled at newly rebuilt school and placed on show in the Great Hall of the school.

== Houses ==
The school consists of three houses, named after three Scottish castles: Airlie, Cortachy and Mains which compete annually in the House Championship and also elect House Captains, formerly one male and one female but now three of any gender combination, from Sixth Year. Originally four houses, the three aforementioned plus Glamis, which was dissolved in 2011.

== Gallery ==
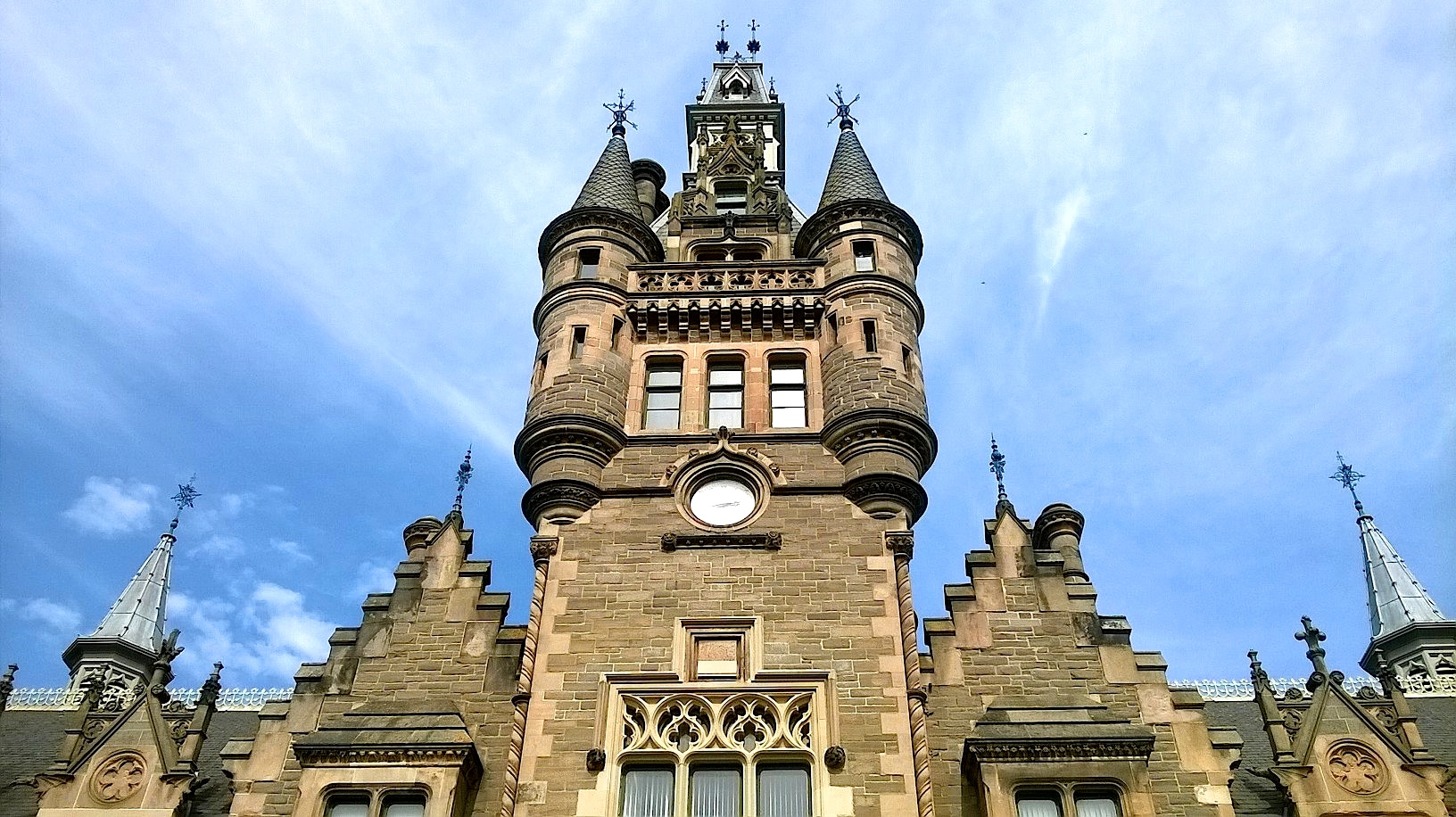
Morgan Academy Dundee Central Tower Detail

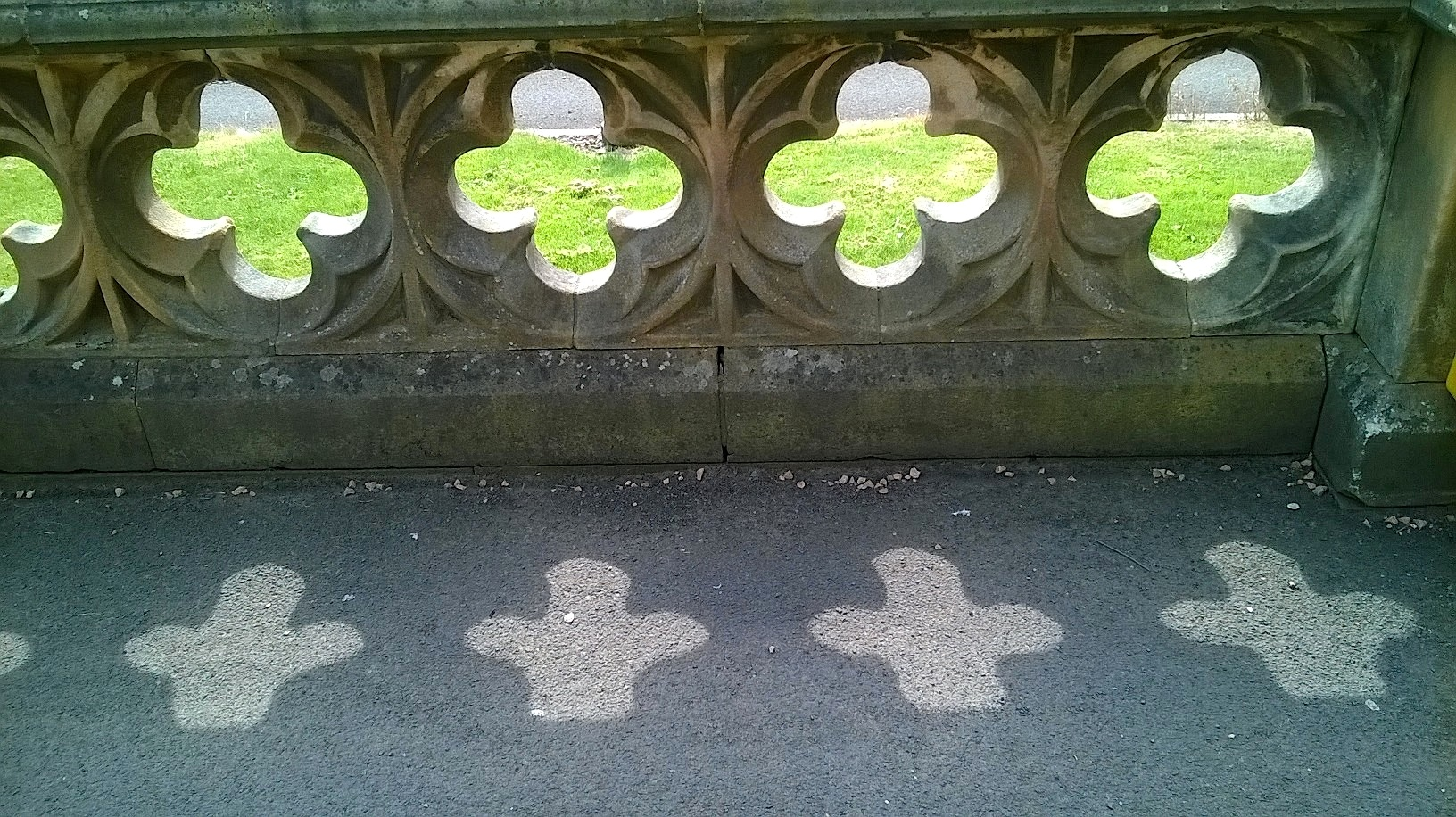
Morgan Academy Dundee Wall Detail
