= Grove Academy =

Secondary school in Dundee, Scotland

Location
- 24 Claypotts Road; Broughty Ferry, Dundee, DD5 1AB; Scotland; 56.4704°N 2.8792°W

Information
- Type: Secondary school
- Motto: In Virtute Divitiae (Riches consist in virtue)
- Established: 1889; 137 years ago
- Local authority: Dundee City Council
- Rector: Mr Woodcock
- Business Manager: Mrs Preston
- Deputes: Mr Doherty - Depute Head Teacher - Orchar House Mr Robertson - Depute Head Teacher - Gillies House Mrs Barbour - Depute Head Teacher - Reres House Mrs Larkworthy - Depute Head Teacher - Dawson House
- Gender: Mixed
- Age range: 11-18
- Enrolment: 1400
- Capacity: 1400
- Houses: Reres; Orchar; Dawson; Gilles
- Colours: Blue and White
- Website: grove.ea.dundeecity.sch.uk

Grove Academy is an 11–18 mixed secondary school in Broughty Ferry, Dundee, Scotland. There are four associated feeder primary schools linked to Grove, which are Barnhill, Craigiebarns, Eastern and Forthill.

== History ==
Grove Academy was established in 1889. In 2007, construction began on completely new buildings on the site of the Extension Buildings and huts. The buildings were designed by the Holmes Partnership built under a public-private partnership. It is maintained by the Robertson Facilities Management. An equity stake in the school is retained by private investors. Phase 1 opened 2008 and Phase 2 opened in November 2009. The new school was completed and formally opened on 2 March 2010 by the First Minister of Scotland Alex Salmond.

== Academic success ==
Of all the schools in Scotland, Grove is one of the highest achieving in terms of academic success. It is placed in the top 30 across the country, an improvement on its placement in the 100s during the 90s.

In 2004, the school was the best performing in Dundee, with 52% of S4 pupils achieving five or more credit level standard grades, 31% of S5s gaining three or more highers and 51% of S6s leaving with three or more highers.

2006 saw the number of S4 pupils achieving five or more standard grade credit level awards in S4 rising from 45% to 58%, the Scottish average being 30%. Grove Academy also reported increases in the number of S6 pupils achieving three or more highers with 48%.

In 2008, Grove Academy led Dundee's exam result attainment, beating the national average in every category. 76% of pupils went on to higher and further education, with 29% of pupils gaining awards at level seven. The results were one of the biggest exam result improvements in Scotland and it has the highest proportion of pupils going on to university, 36%.

== Notable alumni ==
- Alastair Johnston, businessman
- James Meek, author
- Lewis Moonie, politician
- G. C. Peden, emeritus professor of history at Stirling University
- James Skea, academic
- George Thomson, journalist and politician
- Sir Thomas Winsor, lawyer, economic regulatory professional and chief inspector of constabulary
