= Wards of Dundee =

Local electoral subdivisions

Dundee City Council controls Dundee City council area, which is one of Scotland's 32 council areas. The council area is divided into eight wards, used to elect members to the council to provide local government services to the council area.

The boundaries for all Scottish council areas and their sub divisional wards are regulated and regularly reviewed by the Local Government Boundary Commission for Scotland. The current ones were created in 2007 after the 29 existing single member wards were merged into 8 multi-member wards. Each of the eight wards in Dundee elects 3 or 4 councillors every five years in the Scottish local council elections. The most recent elections were held in 2022.

== Summary ==
| Ward number | Ward name | Seats | 2022 result | | | |
| Ward number | Ward name | Seats | SNP | Lab | LD | Con |
|---|---|---|---|---|---|---|
| 1 | Strathmartine | 4 | 2 | 1 | 1 | 0 |
| 2 | Lochee | 4 | 2 [3]* | 2 [1]* | 0 | 0 |
| 3 | West End | 4 | 2 | 0 | 2 | 0 |
| 4 | Coldside | 4 | 2 | 2 | 0 | 0 |
| 5 | Maryfield | 3 | 2 | 1 | 0 | 0 |
| 6 | North East | 3 | 2 | 1 | 0 | 0 |
| 7 | East End | 3 | 2 | 1 | 0 | 0 |
| 8 | The Ferry | 4 | 1 | 1 | 1 | 1 |
| | Total | 29 | 15 [16]* | 9 [8]* | 4 | 1 |
Bold in " 2022 results" indicates largest party in the ward. *numbers in [] brackets indicate current 2024 makeup following by-elections.

== Strathmartine ==
Strathmartine is situated in the north-west of the city. As of the 2022 census, the population was 19,530.

In the 2007 election, Helen Dick, Stewart Hunter, Kevin Keenan and Ian Borthwick were all elected. At the 2012 election, John Alexander won a seat in the ward, becoming the youngest councillor in Scotland and by the 2017 election, becoming the group leader of the SNP and shortly after, leader of Dundee City Council. At the 2022 election, John Alexander was re-elected and Ian Borthwick retired after sixty years as a local councillor. Borthwick's seat was eventually won by Daniel Coleman of the Liberal Democrats.

On 9 July 2024, John Alexander announced his intention to resign as council leader and councillor, triggering a by-election for the Strathmartine ward. The by-election was held on 3 October 2024 and the SNP held the seat.

| Election | Councillors | | | |
|---|---|---|---|---|
| 2007 | Helen Dick (Liberal Democrats) | Stewart Hunter (SNP) | Kevin Keenan (Labour) | Ian Borthwick (Ind.) |
| 2012 | John Alexander (SNP) | Stewart Hunter (SNP) | Kevin Keenan (Labour) | Ian Borthwick (Ind.) |
| 2017 | John Alexander (SNP) | Stewart Hunter (SNP) | Kevin Keenan (Labour) | Ian Borthwick (Ind.) |
| 2022 | John Alexander (SNP) | Stewart Hunter (SNP) | Kevin Keenan (Labour) | Daniel Coleman (Liberal Democrats) |
| 2024 (Note: By-election held following John Alexander's resignation as council leader and councillor.) | Jimmy Black (SNP) | Stewart Hunter (SNP) | Kevin Keenan (Labour) | Daniel Coleman (Liberal Democrats) |

== Lochee ==
Lochee is situated in the west of the city. Population 15,376

In the 2007 election, John Letford, Tom Ferguson, Bob Duncan and Nigel Don were elected. In November 2007, a by-election was held following the resignation of Nigel Don who was elected to the Scottish Parliament in the 2007 Scottish Parliament election for the North East Scotland electoral region. Alan Ross subsequently won the by-election.

At the 2012 election, Norma McGovern replaced John Letford whilst the remaining councillors were all re-elected. In 2017, Norma McGovern, Tom Ferguson and Bob Duncan stepped down and Charlie Malone was elected.

In February 2022, Alan Ross, who was first elected in a by-election for the ward in 2007 defected to Alba, becoming the first Alba representative on Dundee City Council. He subsequently lost his seat to the SNP at the 2022 election.

At the 2022 election, Wendy Sculin replaced Michael Marra as a result of Marra being elected to the Scottish Parliament after the 2021 Scottish Parliament election for the North East Scotland electoral region.

In July 2024, Charlie Malone died, triggering a by-election to be held. The by-election was held on 3 October 2024 and the SNP gained the seat from Labour.

| Election | Councillors | | | |
|---|---|---|---|---|
| 2007 | John Letford (Labour) | Tom Ferguson (Labour) | Bob Duncan (SNP) | Nigel Don (SNP) |
| Nov 2007 (Note: By-election held) | John Letford (Labour) | Tom Ferguson (Labour) | Bob Duncan (SNP) | Alan Ross (SNP/ Alba) |
| 2012 | Norma McGovern (Labour) | Tom Ferguson (Labour) | Bob Duncan (SNP) | Alan Ross (SNP/ Alba) |
| 2017 | Charlie Malone (Labour) | Michael Marra (Labour) | Roisin Smith (SNP) | Alan Ross (SNP/ Alba) |
| Feb 2022 (Note: Alan Ross, who was originally elected as a Scottish National Party councillor, defected to the Alba Party on 5 February 2022) | Charlie Malone (Labour) | Michael Marra (Labour) | Roisin Smith (SNP) | Alan Ross (SNP/ Alba) |
| 2022 | Charlie Malone (Labour) | Wendy Sculin (Labour) | Roisin Smith (SNP) | Siobhan Tolland (SNP) |
| 2024 (Note: By-election held following the passing of Charlie Malone.) | Lee Mills (SNP) | Wendy Sculin (Labour) | Roisin Smith (SNP) | Siobhan Tolland (SNP) |

== West End ==
West End is situated in the south-west of the city. Population 11,941

In the 2007 election, Richard McCready, James Walker Barrie, Donald Hay and Fraser Macpherson were elected. At the 2012 election, James Walker Barrie was replaced by Bill Campbell and Donald Hay lost his seat to Vari McDonald of the SNP. At the 2017 election, Donald Hay won the seat back amid a surge in Conservative support across Scotland.

At the 2022 election, Richard McCready lost his seat to Nadia El-Nakla of the SNP, who is wife of Humza Yousaf, the Health Secretary in the Scottish Parliament. Donald Hay was once again defeated, having been beaten by Michael Critchon of the Liberal Democrats.

| Election | Councillors | | | |
|---|---|---|---|---|
| 2007 | Richard McCready (Labour) | James Walker Barrie (SNP) | Donald Hay (Conservative) | Fraser MacPherson (Liberal Democrats) |
| 2012 | Richard McCready (Labour) | Bill Campbell (SNP) | Vari McDonald (SNP) | Fraser MacPherson (Liberal Democrats) |
| 2017 | Richard McCready (Labour) | Bill Campbell (SNP) | Donald Hay (Conservative) | Fraser MacPherson (Liberal Democrats) |
| 2022 | Nadia El-Nakla (SNP) | Bill Campbell (SNP) | Michael Crichton (Liberal Democrats) | Fraser MacPherson (Liberal Democrats) |

== Coldside ==
Coldside is situated in the centre/west of the city. Population 16,731

In the 2007 election, Helen Wright, Mohammed Asif, James Black and Dave Bowes were elected.

At the 2012 election, Mohammed Asif was replaced by George McIrvine and James Black was replaced by Mark Flynn who would later go on to be Dundee City Council's head of city development.

At the 2017 election, Anne Rendall replaced Dave Bowes as the fourth councillor on the ward.

Heather Anderson, who was briefly a Member of the European Parliament for the SNP before the United Kingdom left the European Union, was elected to replace Anne Rendall after she retired at the 2022 election.

| Election | Councillors | | | |
|---|---|---|---|---|
| 2007 | Helen Wright (Labour) | Mohammed Asif (Labour) | James Black (SNP) | Dave Bowes (SNP) |
| 2012 | Helen Wright (Labour) | Mohammed Asif (Labour) | James Black (SNP) | Dave Bowes (SNP) |
| 2017 | Helen Wright (Labour) | George McIrvine (Labour) | Mark Flynn (SNP) | Anne Rendall (SNP) |
| 2022 | Helen Wright (Labour) | George McIrvine (Labour) | Mark Flynn (SNP) | Heather Anderson (SNP) |

== Maryfield ==
Maryfield is situated in the centre/east of the city. Population 15,230

In the 2007 election, Joe Morrow, Elizabeth Fordyce and Ken Lynn were elected. A by-election took place following the resignation of Joe Morrow where Craig Melville of the SNP gained the seat from Labour. At the 2012 election, Georgia Cruickshank replaced Elizabeth Fordyce as the second councillor in the ward.

In 2016, another by-election was held following Craig Melville's resignation. The seat was won by Lynne Short. Short, Cruickshank and Lynn were all subsequently re-elected at the 2017 and 2022 elections.

| Election | Councillors | | |
|---|---|---|---|
| 2007 | Joe Morrow (Labour) | Elizabeth Fordyce (SNP) | Ken Lynn (SNP) |
| 2009 | Craig Melville (SNP) | Elizabeth Fordyce (SNP) | Ken Lynn (SNP) |
| 2012 | Craig Melville (SNP) | Georgia Cruickshank (Labour) | Ken Lynn (SNP) |
| 2016 | Lynne Short (SNP) | Georgia Cruickshank (Labour) | Ken Lynn (SNP) |
| 2017 | Lynne Short (SNP) | Georgia Cruickshank (Labour) | Ken Lynn (SNP) |
| 2022 | Lynne Short (SNP) | Georgia Cruickshank (Labour) | Ken Lynn (SNP) |

== North East ==
North East is situated in the north-east of the city. Population 11,591

In the 2007 election, Brian Gordon, Andy Dawson and Willie Sawers were elected, all three previously served in three of the previous 29 single member wards. At the election in 2012, Brian Gordon was re-elected alongside Willie Sawers with Gregor Murray winning a seat which was previously held by Andy Dawson. In 2017, all three councillors were re-elected.

In 2019, Brian Gordon died and a by-election was held which resulted in the SNP gaining the seat from Labour which was won by Steven Rome. Gregor Murray who was elected as an SNP councillor, resigned from the party and sat as an independent for the remainder of the term.

In 2022, Labour gained Gregor Murray's seat whilst Steven Rome and Willie Sawers were re-elected.

| Election | Councillors | | |
|---|---|---|---|
| 2007 | Brian Gordon (Labour) | Andy Dawson (SNP) | Willie Sawers (SNP) |
| 2012 | Brian Gordon (Labour) | Gregor Murray (SNP / Independent) | Willie Sawers (SNP) |
| 2017 | Brian Gordon (Labour) | Gregor Murray (SNP / Independent) | Willie Sawers (SNP) |
| 2019 (Note: By-election held following the death of Brian Gordon) (Note: Gregor Murray resigned from the Scottish National Party on 15 May 2019) | Steven Rome (SNP) | Gregor Murray (SNP / Independent) | Willie Sawers (SNP) |
| 2022 | Steven Rome (SNP) | Jax Finnegan (Labour) | Willie Sawers (SNP) |

== East End ==
East End is situated in the south-east of the city. Population 12,715

In the 2007 election, George Regan, Will Dawson and Christina Roberts were elected. At the 2012 election, Regan was replaced by Lesley Brennan who in turn was replaced by Margaret Richardson at the 2017 election. Dorothy McHugh succeeded Richardson after she retired after the 2022 election. In September 2025, Christina Roberts resigned from the SNP in 2025 for undisclosed reasons and announced that she would be sitting as an independent councillor for the remainder of the term.

| Election | Councillors | | |
|---|---|---|---|
| 2007 | George Regan (Labour) | William Dawson (SNP) | Christina Roberts (SNP / Ind) |
| 2012 | Lesley Brennan (Labour) | William Dawson (SNP) | Christina Roberts (SNP / Ind) |
| 2017 | Margaret Richardson (Labour) | William Dawson (SNP) | Christina Roberts (SNP / Ind) |
| 2022 | Dorothy McHugh (Labour) | William Dawson (SNP) | Christina Roberts (SNP / Ind) |
| 2025 (Note: Christina Roberts resigned from the Scottish National Party on 23 September 2025) | Dorothy McHugh (Labour) | William Dawson (SNP) | Christina Roberts (SNP / Ind) |

== The Ferry ==
The Ferry is situated in the east of the city, covering Broughty Ferry. Population 16,609

In the 2007 election, Laurie Bidwell, Ken Guild, Derek Scott and Rod Wallace were elected. Ken Guild, who was the SNP group leader on the council became the leader of Dundee City Council after holding his seat at the 2012 election. At the same time, Bidwell and Scott retained their seats whilst the fourth seat was won by Kevin Cordell of the SNP.

Following Guild's retirement as councillor at the 2017 election, his seat was won by Philip Scott of the Conservatives. The 2017 election also saw Craig Duncan of the Liberal Democrats replace Laurie Bidwell. At the 2022 election, Phillip Scott lost his seat to Pete Shears of Labour. The Liberal Democrats replaced the Conservatives as the largest party in the ward in terms of vote share following the collapse of the party overall in Scotland.

| Election | Councillors | | | |
|---|---|---|---|---|
| 2007 | Laurie Bidwell (Labour) | Ken Guild(SNP) | Derek Scott (Conservative) | Rod Wallace (Conservative) |
| 2012 | Laurie Bidwell (Labour) | Ken Guild(SNP) | Derek Scott (Conservative) | Kevin Cordell (SNP) |
| 2017 | Craig Duncan (Liberal Democrats) | Philip Scott (Conservative) | Derek Scott (Conservative) | Kevin Cordell (SNP) |
| 2022 | Craig Duncan (Liberal Democrats) | Pete Shears (Labour) | Derek Scott (Conservative) | Kevin Cordell (SNP) |
