= Lesley Brennan =

Scottish politician (born 1972)

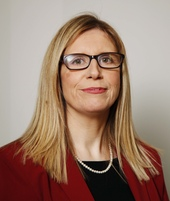
- Brennan in 2016

Member of the Scottish Parliament for North East Scotland (1 of 7 Regional MSPs)
- In office 13 January 2016 – 24 March 2016
- Preceded by: Richard Baker

Personal details
- Born: March 1972 (age 54)
- Party: Scottish Labour Party
- Other political affiliations: Campaign for Socialism

Lesley Brennan (born March 1972) is a Scottish politician who served as chief of staff to Richard Leonard, during his tenure as Leader of the Scottish Labour Party, from 2017 to 2021. She was formerly a Member of the Scottish Parliament (MSP) for the North East Scotland region for 70 days in early 2016 and a councillor in Dundee from 2012 to 2016. She has also worked as an economist and as a parliamentary assistant.

== Early life ==
Brennan was educated at Lawside Academy in Dundee. She graduated from Abertay University in 1999 with a first-class honours degree in economics, then studied at the University of Edinburgh where she gained a master's degree in economics in 2001.

== Political career ==
Brennan was elected to the East End ward of Dundee City Council in 2012. In October 2013, she was selected by Scottish Labour to contest Dundee East at the 2015 United Kingdom general election. However, she lost to the incumbent Stewart Hosie.

When Richard Baker resigned from the Scottish Parliament in January 2016, Labour nominated Brennan as his replacement as she had been next on their North East Scotland regional list. Brennan was sworn in on 13 January 2016, and served until the Parliament's dissolution two months later in March. She stood at the 2016 Scottish Parliament election where Labour had placed her third on their regional list for North East Scotland, but she was not re-elected. As a former MSP who had not been re-elected, she received a resettlement package of more than £30,000. In October 2016, she announced that she would not seek re-election when her term as councillor finished in 2017.

From 2016 to 2017, Brennan served as parliamentary assistant to Neil Findlay. She was selected by Labour to contest Dundee East again at the 2017 general election. She received 2,000 more votes than in 2015 but finished in third place behind Hosie and the Conservative candidate. A member of Campaign for Socialism, she was appointed in November 2017 by Scottish Labour leader Richard Leonard to serve as his chief of staff.
