= 2022 Dundee City Council election =

Dundee City Council election

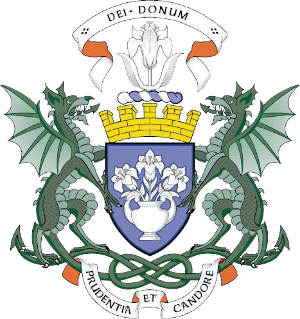
- 5 May 2022

All 29 seats to Dundee City Council 15 seats needed for a majority
- Registered: 112,454
- Turnout: 40.3%
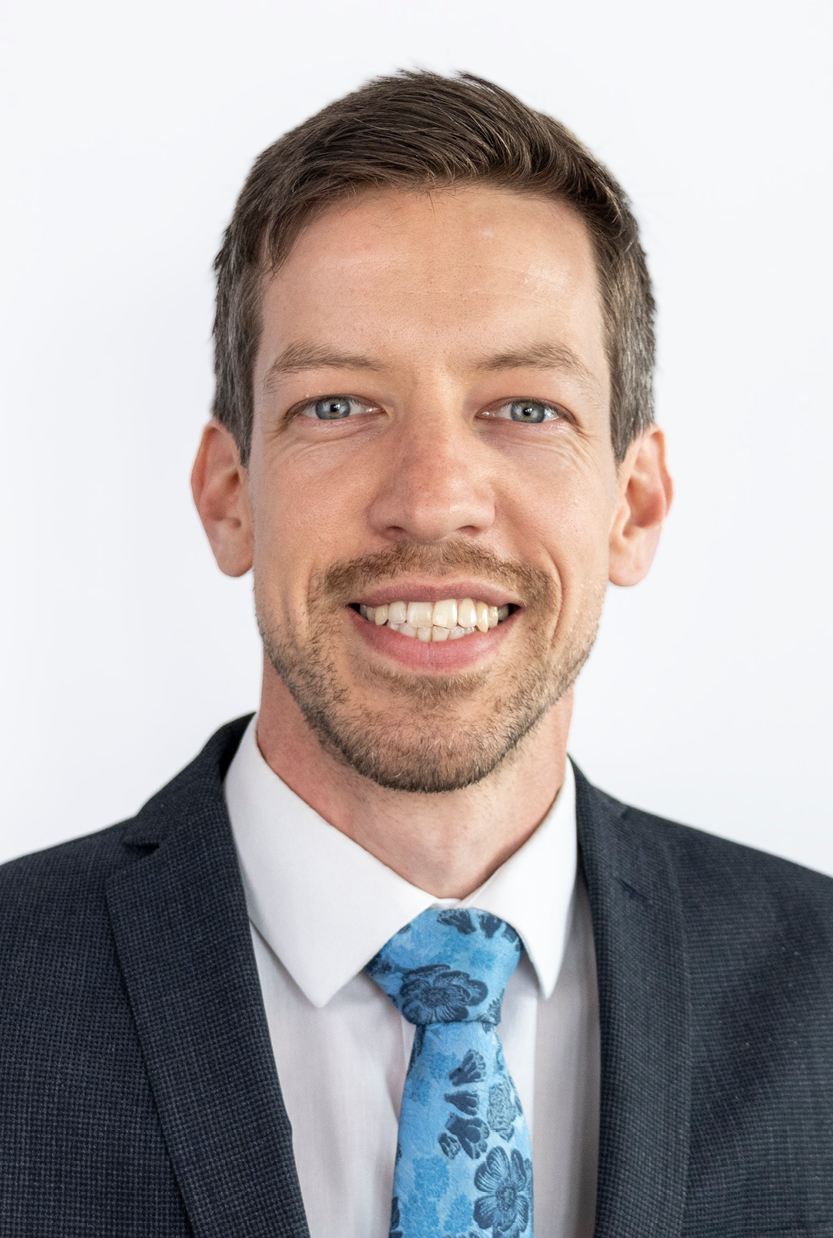
| | First party | Second party |
|---|---|---|
| Leader | John Alexander | Kevin Keenan |
| Party | SNP | Labour |
| Leader's seat | Strathmartine | Strathmartine |
| Last election | 14 seats, 41.3% | 9 seats, 20.3% |
| Seats before | 13 | 8 |
| Seats won | 15 | 9 |
| Seat change | ▲1 | Steady |
| Popular vote | 18,302 | 9,740 |
| Percentage | 41.4% | 22.0% |
| Swing | ▲0.1% | ▲1.7% |
| | Third party | Fourth party |
| Leader | Fraser MacPherson | Derek Scott |
| Party | Liberal Democrats | Conservative |
| Leader's seat | West End | The Ferry |
| Last election | 2 seats, 11.3% | 3 seats, 17.2% |
| Seats before | 2 | 3 |
| Seats won | 4 | 1 |
| Seat change | ▲2 | ▼2 |
| Popular vote | 7,312 | 4,861 |
| Percentage | 16.5% | 11.0% |
| Swing | ▲5.2% | ▼6.2% |
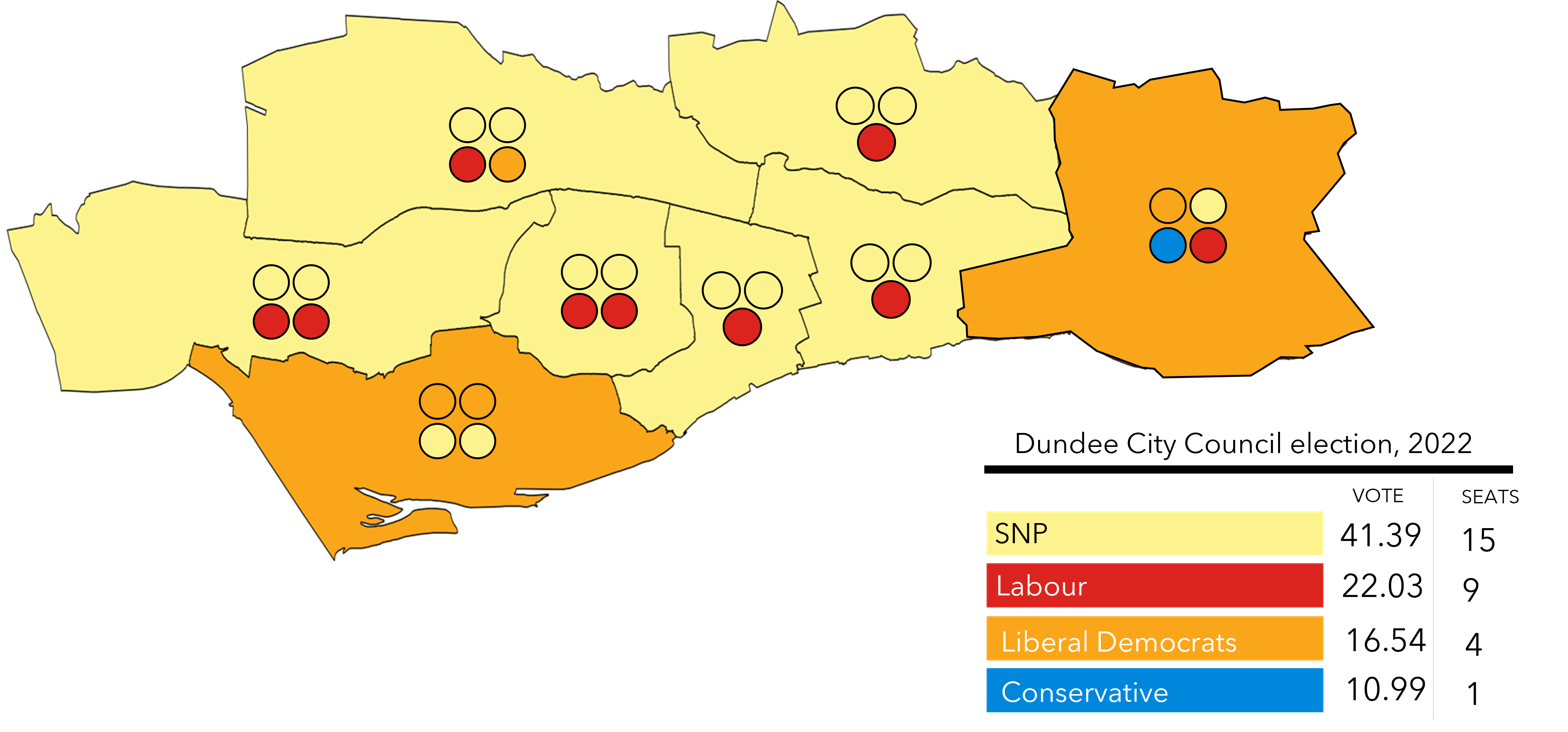
- The eight multi-member wards by winning party.

Leader before election
John Alexander
(SNP)
No overall control
Leader after election
John Alexander
SNP

Elections to Dundee City Council took place on 5 May 2022, the same day as the 31 other Scottish local government elections. As with other Scottish council elections, it was held using single transferable vote (STV) – a form of proportional representation – in which multiple candidates are elected in each ward and voters rank candidates in order of preference.

For the fifth consecutive election, the Scottish National Party (SNP) were returned as the largest party, regaining the majority they had lost at the previous election. Labour were again returned as the second-largest party with nine seats. The Liberal Democrats gained two seats, bringing their total up to four and the Conservatives fell to fourth place, retaining just one seat.

The SNP retained control of the council and continued in administration now with an overall majority of seats. Incumbent council leader Cllr John Alexander was re-elected to the post and Cllrs Bill Campbell and Kevin Cordell were appointed Lord Provost and Deputy Lord Provost.

== Background ==
=== Previous election ===
At the previous election in 2017, the Scottish National Party (SNP) won 14 seats and as a result, was the largest party. Despite two losses, the SNP continued to govern; however, they no longer held a majority after the Conservatives and Liberal Democrats made gains. Labour was the second-largest party on the council with nine seats, the Conservatives won three seats, up two and the Liberal Democrats won two seats, up one.

2017 Dundee City Council election result
| Party | Seats | Vote share |
|---|---|---|
| SNP | 14 | 41.3% |
| Labour | 9 | 20.3% |
| Conservative | 3 | 17.2% |
| Liberal Democrats | 2 | 11.3% |
| Independent | 1 | 5.3% |

=== Electoral system ===
The election used the eight wards created under the Local Governance (Scotland) Act 2004, with 29 councillors being elected. Each ward elected either 3 or 4 members, using the single transferable vote (STV) electoral system – a form of proportional representation – where candidates are ranked in order of preference.

=== Composition ===
After the 2017 election, there were several changes to the composition of the council. Most were changes to the political affiliation of councillors including North East councillor Gregor Murray who resigned from the SNP in May 2019 after accusing the party of being transphobic and Lochee councillor Alan Ross who first left the SNP to become an independent before defecting to Alba in February 2022. A single by-election was held during the 2017–22 term which resulted in an SNP gain from Labour.

| Party | 2017 election | Dissolution |
|---|---|---|
| SNP | 14 | 13 |
| Labour | 9 | 8 |
| Conservative | 3 | 3 |
| Liberal Democrats | 2 | 2 |
| Independent | 1 | 2 |
| Alba | 0 | 1 |

=== Retiring councillors ===
Retiring councillors
| Ward | Party | Retiring councillor |
|---|---|---|
| Strathmartine | Independent | Ian Borthwick |
| Coldside | SNP | Anne Rendall |
| North East | Independent | Gregor Murray |
| East End | Labour | Margaret Richardson |

=== Candidates ===
The total number of candidates fell from 69 in 2017 to 67. As was the case five years previous, the SNP fielded the highest number of candidates at 16 (the same as in 2017) across the eight wards. Labour, the Liberal Democrats and the Conservatives also fielded at least one candidate in every ward. The nine candidates fielded by the Liberal Democrats were two less than in 2017 whereas Labour (10) and the Conservatives (nine) maintained their total number of candidates. The Greens, who increased the number of candidates by one, and the Alba Party, who contested a Dundee election for the first time, fielded one candidate in each of the eight wards. The Trade Unionist and Socialist Coalition (TUSC) only fielded two candidates, down from seven in 2017. For the first time, the Scottish Family Party (three), the Independence for Scotland Party (ISP) (one) and Sovereignty (one) contested an election in Dundee. Unlike the previous election, there were no independent candidates and neither the United Kingdom Independence Party (UKIP), the Scottish Socialist Party (SSP) nor the Independent Network named any candidates.

=== Debates and hustings ===
Ahead of the election, a series of debates and hustings were held throughout the campaign period. DC Thomson hosted an election debate on 21 April 2022 which was moderated by Derek Healey, the political editor of The Courier. The debate featured only leaders and representatives of the five parties on the council and an appeal for questions to be considered were featured.

A hustings took place on 27 April 2022 which was organised and moderated by the Dundee Social Enterprise Network. The hustings featured representatives of the four parties on the council along with the inclusion of the Greens but not the Alba Party.

2022 Dundee City Council election debates and hustings
| Date | Organisers | Moderator(s) | P Present (Note: Denotes a main invitee attending the event.) S Surrogate (Note: Denotes a main invitee not attending the event, sending a surrogate in their place.) NI Not invited A | | | | | | | |
| Date | Organisers | Moderator(s) | SNP | Labour | Conservatives | Lib Dems | Greens | Alba | Audience | Ref. |
|---|---|---|---|---|---|---|---|---|---|---|
| 21 April | DC Thomson | Derek Healey (Note: Political editor of The Courier) | P Alexander | S McCready (Note: Richard McCready, Labour.) | P Scott (Note: Phillip Scott, Scottish Conservative group leader at Dundee City Council, councillor in The Ferry ward.) | P MacPherson (Note: Fraser MacPherson, Scottish Liberal Democrat group leader at Dundee City Council, councillor in the West End ward.) | P Jones (Note: Tanya Jones, Scottish Green candidate for the Coldside ward.) | P Ross (Note: Alan Ross, Alba Party sole representative at Dundee City Council, councillor for Lochee ward.) | Virtual | |
| 27 April | Dundee SEN | | S Short (Note: Lynne Short, SNP councillor for the Maryfield ward.) | S McCready | S MacKenzie (Note: Gavin MacKenzie, Conservative.) | S Crichton (Note: Michael Crichton, Liberal Democrats.) | P Jones | NI | Yes | |

== Results ==
2022 Dundee City Council election result
| Party | Seats | Gains | Losses | Net gain/loss | Seats % | Votes % | Votes | +/− |
|---|---|---|---|---|---|---|---|---|
| SNP | 15 | 1 | 0 | ▲1 | 51.7 | 41.4 | 18,302 | ▲0.1 |
| Labour | 9 | 1 | 1 | Steady | 31.0 | 22.0 | 9,740 | ▲1.7 |
| Liberal Democrats | 4 | 2 | 0 | ▲2 | 13.8 | 16.5 | 7,312 | ▲5.2 |
| Conservative | 1 | 0 | 2 | ▼2 | 3.5 | 11.0 | 4,861 | ▼6.2 |
| Green | 0 | 0 | 0 | Steady | 0.0 | 5.7 | 2,538 | ▲3.2 |
| Alba | 0 | 0 | 0 | Steady | 0.0 | 2.4 | 1,053 | New |
| Scottish Family | 0 | 0 | 0 | Steady | 0.0 | 0.6 | 268 | New |
| TUSC | 0 | 0 | 0 | Steady | 0.0 | 0.2 | 95 | ▼1.4 |
| Sovereignty | 0 | 0 | 0 | Steady | 0.0 | 0.1 | 34 | New |
| ISP | 0 | 0 | 0 | Steady | 0.0 | 0.0 | 15 | New |
| Total | 29 | | | | | | 44,218 | |

Note:

- Votes are the sum of first preference votes across all council wards. The net gain/loss and percentage changes relate to the result of the previous Scottish local elections on 4 May 2017. This is because STV has an element of proportionality which is not present unless multiple seats are being elected. This may differ from other published sources showing gain/loss relative to seats held at the dissolution of Scotland's councils.
- One independent candidate was elected in 2017 but none stood in 2022.

=== Ward summary ===
2022 Dundee City Council election by ward
| Ward | % | Cllrs | % | Cllrs | % | Cllrs | % | Cllrs | % | Cllrs | Total Cllrs |
| Ward | SNP | | Labour | | Lib Dem | | Conservative | | Others | | Total Cllrs |
|---|---|---|---|---|---|---|---|---|---|---|---|
| Strathmartine | 45.4 | 2 | 22.8 | 1 | 18.7 | 1 | 5.9 | 0 | 7.2 | 0 | 4 |
| Lochee | 43.2 | 2 | 35.8 | 2 | 3.1 | 0 | 8.4 | 0 | 9.5 | 0 | 4 |
| West End | 36.5 | 2 | 10.9 | 0 | 44.1 | 2 | 6.7 | 0 | 10.8 | 0 | 4 |
| Coldside | 44.5 | 2 | 31.1 | 2 | 3.1 | 0 | 7.9 | 0 | 13.3 | 0 | 4 |
| Maryfield | 47.4 | 2 | 22.6 | 1 | 4.7 | 0 | 8.8 | 0 | 16.5 | 0 | 3 |
| North East | 56.5 | 2 | 26.6 | 1 | 2.6 | 0 | 8.3 | 0 | 6.0 | 0 | 3 |
| East End | 52.0 | 2 | 26.0 | 1 | 2.8 | 0 | 10.7 | 0 | 7.8 | 0 | 3 |
| The Ferry | 27.6 | 1 | 10.0 | 1 | 34.7 | 1 | 23.0 | 1 | 4.7 | 0 | 4 |
| Total | 41.4 | 15 | 22.0 | 9 | 16.5 | 4 | 11.0 | 1 | 9.0 | 0 | 29 |

=== Seats changing hands ===
Below is a list of seats which elected a different party or parties from 2017 in order to highlight the change in political composition of the council from the previous election. The list does not include defeated incumbents who resigned or defected from their party and subsequently failed re-election while the party held the seat.

Seats changing hands
| Seat | 2017 | | 2022 | |
| Seat | Party | Member | Party | Member |
|---|---|---|---|---|
| Strathmartine | Independent | Ian Borthwick | Liberal Democrats | Daniel Coleman |
| West End | Conservative | Donald Hay | SNP | Nadia El-Nakla |
| West End | Labour | Richard McCready | Liberal Democrats | Michael Crichton |
| The Ferry | Conservative | Philip Scott | Labour | Pete Shears |

== Ward results ==
=== Strathmartine ===
The SNP (2) and Labour (1) retained the seats they won at the previous election while the Liberal Democrats gained a seat from independent councillor Ian Borthwick.

Strathmartine – 4 seats
| Party | Candidate | FPv% | Count | | |
| Party | Candidate | FPv% | 1 | 2 | 3 |
|---|---|---|---|---|---|
| SNP | John Alexander (incumbent) | 36.0 | 2,143 | | |
| Labour | Kevin Keenan (incumbent) | 22.8 | 1,359 | | |
| Liberal Democrats | Daniel Coleman | 18.7 | 1,116 | 1,169 | 1,226 |
| SNP | Stewart Hunter (incumbent) | 9.4 | 559 | 1,310 | |
| Conservative | Calum Walker | 5.9 | 351 | 353 | 366 |
| Green | Callum Baird | 3.3 | 199 | 268 | 284 |
| Alba | Laura Whyte | 1.8 | 105 | 120 | 125 |
| Scottish Family | Susan Ettle | 1.4 | 81 | 86 | 91 |
| TUSC | Maddie Jamieson | 0.7 | 43 | 46 | 60 |
Electorate: 15,266 Valid: 5,956 Spoilt: 168 Quota: 1,192 Turnout: 40.1%

=== Lochee ===
The SNP (2) and Labour (2) retained the seats they won at the previous election.

Lochee – 4 seats
| Party | Candidate | FPv% | Count | | | | | | | |
| Party | Candidate | FPv% | 1 | 2 | 3 | 4 | 5 | 6 | 7 | 8 |
|---|---|---|---|---|---|---|---|---|---|---|
| SNP | Roisin Smith (incumbent) | 37.2 | 2,174 | | | | | | | |
| Labour | Charlie Malone (incumbent) | 28.7 | 1,678 | | | | | | | |
| Conservative | Gavin MacKenzie | 8.0 | 488 | 492 | 505 | 531 | 543 | 543 | 603 | 623 |
| Labour | Wendy Scullin | 7.0 | 412 | 448 | 820 | 846 | 872 | 876 | 935 | 1,085 |
| SNP | Siobhan Tolland | 6.0 | 351 | 1,128 | 1,137 | 1,144 | 1,204 | | | |
| Green | Kate Treharne | 4.0 | 244 | 308 | 318 | 326 | 369 | 383 | 438 | |
| Liberal Democrats | Jonathan Bremner | 3.1 | 184 | 196 | 221 | 244 | 255 | 256 | | |
| Alba | Alan Ross (incumbent) | 3.1 | 184 | 208 | 220 | 230 | | | | |
Electorate: 14,912 Valid: 5,843 Spoilt: 179 Quota: 1,169 Turnout: 40.4%

=== West End ===
The SNP and the Liberal Democrats retained the seats they won at the previous election and gained one seat each from the Conservatives and Labour.

West End – 4 seats
| Party | Candidate | FPv% | Count | | | | | | |
| Party | Candidate | FPv% | 1 | 2 | 3 | 4 | 5 | 6 | 7 |
|---|---|---|---|---|---|---|---|---|---|
| Liberal Democrats | Fraser MacPherson (incumbent) | 37.4 | 2,146 | | | | | | |
| SNP | Nadia El-Nakla | 16.1 | 924 | 961 | 964 | 974 | 978 | 1,127 | |
| SNP | Bill Campbell (incumbent) | 15.2 | 872 | 922 | 923 | 939 | 946 | 1,058 | 1,119 |
| Labour | Richard McCready (incumbent) | 10.9 | 624 | 731 | 734 | 740 | 831 | 928 | 931 |
| Green | Ted Booth | 9.4 | 536 | 565 | 566 | 577 | 593 | | |
| Conservative | Donald Hay (incumbent) | 6.7 | 386 | 453 | 453 | 547 | | | |
| Liberal Democrats | Michael Crichton | 2.9 | 165 | 821 | 823 | 836 | 1,021 | 1,102 | 1,105 |
| Alba | Annie Jenkins | 1.1 | 54 | 68 | 72 | | | | |
| ISP | Brooke Labagh | 0.3 | 14 | 17 | | | | | |
Electorate: 14,626 Valid: 5,732 Spoilt: 104 Quota: 1,147 Turnout: 39.9%

=== Coldside ===
The SNP (2), and Labour (2) retained the seats they won at the previous election.

Coldside – 4 seats
| Party | Candidate | FPv% | Count | | | | | | |
| Party | Candidate | FPv% | 1 | 2 | 3 | 4 | 5 | 6 | 7 |
|---|---|---|---|---|---|---|---|---|---|
| SNP | Heather Anderson | 31.1 | 1,737 | | | | | | |
| Labour | George McIrvine (incumbent) | 17.2 | 960 | 970 | 982 | 987 | 1,011 | 1,044 | 1,155 |
| Labour | Helen Wright (incumbent) | 13.9 | 777 | 785 | 797 | 812 | 822 | 854 | 937 |
| SNP | Mark Flynn (incumbent) | 13.4 | 751 | 1,275 | | | | | |
| Green | Tanya Jones | 9.9 | 551 | 584 | 636 | 656 | 702 | 764 | 808 |
| Conservative | Naveed Ali | 7.9 | 444 | 446 | 448 | 450 | 463 | 485 | |
| Liberal Democrats | Jenny Blain | 3.1 | 176 | 179 | 183 | 185 | 195 | | |
| Alba | Scott Agnew | 2.5 | 141 | 150 | 164 | 165 | | | |
| TUSC | Wayne Scott | 0.9 | 52 | 52 | 56 | | | | |
Electorate: 14,893 Valid: 5,589 Spoilt: 238 Quota: 1,118 Turnout: 39.1%

=== Maryfield ===
The SNP (2), and Labour (1) retained the seats they won at the previous election.

Maryfield – 3 seats
| Party | Candidate | FPv% | Count | | | |
| Party | Candidate | FPv% | 1 | 2 | 3 | 4 |
|---|---|---|---|---|---|---|
| SNP | Ken Lynn (incumbent) | 24.6 | 1,037 | 1,037 | 1,042 | 1,093 |
| SNP | Lynne Short (incumbent) | 22.8 | 960 | 962 | 974 | 1,005 |
| Labour | Georgia Cruickshank (incumbent) | 22.6 | 956 | 957 | 1,017 | 1,062 |
| Green | Martha Smart | 10.6 | 446 | 453 | 493 | 517 |
| Conservative | Danielle Marr | 8.8 | 371 | 376 | 414 | 430 |
| Alba | Sundas Kamran | 5.1 | 214 | 218 | 226 | |
| Liberal Democrats | Rebecca Dewar | 4.7 | 198 | 202 | | |
| Sovereignty | Ewan Gurr | 0.8 | 34 | | | |
Electorate: 12,749 Valid: 4,213 Quota: 1,054 Turnout: 33.9%

=== North East ===
The SNP (2), and Labour (1) retained the seats they won at the previous election.

North East – 3 seats
| Party | Candidate | FPv% | Count |
| Party | Candidate | FPv% | 1 |
|---|---|---|---|
| SNP | Steven Rome (incumbent) | 30.4 | 1,150 |
| Labour | Jax Finniegan | 26.6 | 1,007 |
| SNP | Willie Sawers (incumbent) | 26.2 | 991 |
| Conservative | Lisa Franchi | 8.3 | 313 |
| Green | Stuart White | 3.3 | 126 |
| Alba | Heather McLean | 2.7 | 102 |
| Liberal Democrats | Mark Smith | 2.7 | 100 |
Electorate: 11,792 Valid: 3,789 Spoilt: 96 Quota: 948 Turnout: 32.9%

=== East End ===
The SNP (2), and Labour (1) retained the seats they won at the previous election.

East End – 3 seats
| Party | Candidate | FPv% | Count | |
| Party | Candidate | FPv% | 1 | 2 |
|---|---|---|---|---|
| SNP | Will Dawson (incumbent) | 32.8 | 1,350 | |
| Labour | Dorothy McHugh | 26.0 | 1,071 | |
| SNP | Christina Roberts (incumbent) | 20.0 | 823 | 1,088 |
| Conservative | Bill Crabb | 10.7 | 440 | 444 |
| Green | Alison McIntosh | 4.1 | 168 | 184 |
| Alba | Allan Petrie | 3.7 | 151 | 158 |
| Liberal Democrats | Outi Mȁȁttȁnen-Burke | 2.8 | 115 | 120 |
Electorate: 12,005 Valid: 4,117 Quota: 1,030 Turnout: 35.2%

=== The Ferry ===
The SNP and Liberal Democrats retained the seats they won at the previous election while the Conservatces held one seat and lost one seat to Labour.

The Ferry – 4 seats
| Party | Candidate | FPv% | Count | | | | | | | |
| Party | Candidate | FPv% | 1 | 2 | 3 | 4 | 5 | 6 | 7 | 8 |
|---|---|---|---|---|---|---|---|---|---|---|
| Liberal Democrats | Craig Duncan (incumbent) | 34.7 | 3,112 | | | | | | | |
| SNP | Kevin Cordell (incumbent) | 20.1 | 1,806 | | | | | | | |
| Conservative | Derek Scott (incumbent) | 18.5 | 1,661 | 2,064 | | | | | | |
| Labour | Pete Shears | 10.0 | 899 | 1,150 | 1,156 | 1,157 | 1,168 | 1,180 | 1,292 | 1,462 |
| SNP | Qaiser Habib | 7.5 | 674 | 819 | 820 | 829 | 832 | 867 | 1,030 | 1,043 |
| Conservative | Philip Scott (incumbent) | 4.5 | 407 | 459 | 706 | 706 | 730 | 745 | 763 | |
| Green | Mark Parsons | 3.0 | 269 | 398 | 400 | 401 | 413 | 423 | | |
| Alba | Thomas Byrne | 1.0 | 92 | 109 | 109 | 109 | 113 | | | |
| Scottish Family | Carole Smith | 0.7 | 59 | 87 | 88 | 88 | | | | |
Electorate: 16,211 Valid: 8,979 Quota: 1,796 Turnout: 56.3%

== Aftermath ==
The SNP, who have been in charge of Dundee City Council since winning the 2009 Maryfield by-election, took overall control of the council after winning a majority of seats. Cllr John Alexander was returned as council leader and Cllrs Bill Campbell and Kevin Cordell were appointed Lord Provost and Deputy Lord Provost on 20 May 2022.

Council leader John Alexander decided to leave politics in August 2024 and resigned as both a councillor and as council leader. He was replaced as council leader by Cllr Mark Flynn.

In September 2025, East End councillor Christina Roberts resigned from the SNP and became an independent but refused to give any reason for her decision to leave the party.

=== October 2024 by-elections ===
In July 2024, Lochee councillor Charlie Malone died aged 63. This was followed in August by Strathmartine SNP councillor and council leader John Alexander deciding to leave politics to take up a new job at SSEN. By-elections to elect their replacements were scheduled for 3 October 2024. Both were won by the SNP as Lee Mills won the Lochee by-election and Jimmy Black won the Strathmartine by-election.

Strathmartine by-election (3 October 2024) – 1 seat
| Party | Candidate | FPv% | Count | | | | | |
| Party | Candidate | FPv% | 1 | 2 | 3 | 4 | 5 | 6 |
|---|---|---|---|---|---|---|---|---|
| SNP | Jimmy Black | 35.0 | 1,188 | 1,205 | 1,260 | 1,274 | 1,426 | 1,835 |
| Liberal Democrats | Jenny Blain | 26.9 | 912 | 932 | 963 | 1,016 | 1,394 | |
| Labour | Richard McCready | 26.9 | 911 | 929 | 947 | 972 | | |
| Conservative | Naveed Ali | 4.2 | 143 | 145 | 150 | | | |
| Green | Callum Baird | 3.6 | 121 | 134 | | | | |
| TUSC | Donald Macleod | 3.4 | 116 | | | | | |
Electorate: 15,403 Valid: 3,432 Spoilt: 41 Quota: 1,696 Turnout: 22.3%

Lochee by-election (3 October 2024) – 1 seat
| Party | Candidate | FPv% | Count | | | | | | |
| Party | Candidate | FPv% | 1 | 2 | 3 | 4 | 5 | 6 | 7 |
|---|---|---|---|---|---|---|---|---|---|
| SNP | Lee Mills | 37.3 | 1,203 | 1,211 | 1,226 | 1,292 | 1,369 | 1,390 | 1,742 |
| Labour | Marty Smith | 35.6 | 1,148 | 1,167 | 1,211 | 1,236 | 1,285 | 1,357 | |
| Conservative | Calum Walker | 6.8 | 219 | 230 | 258 | 268 | 284 | | |
| Alba | Alan Ross | 5.5 | 178 | 204 | 212 | | | | |
| Green | Katie Treharne | 5.5 | 176 | 190 | 217 | 238 | | | |
| Liberal Democrats | Outi Bourke | 4.8 | 156 | 171 | | | | | |
| Workers Party | John Reddy | 4.4 | 143 | | | | | | |
Electorate: 15,237 Valid: 3,223 Spoilt: 31 Quota: 1,612 Turnout: 21.4%
