= 2012 Dundee City Council election =

2012 Scottish local government election

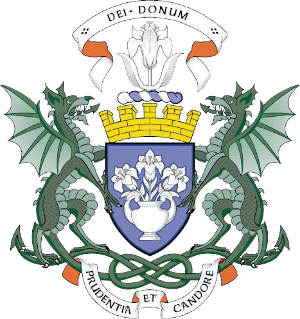
← 2007	3 May 2012	2017 →

All 29 seats to Dundee City Council 15 seats needed for a majority
	First party	Second party	Third party
Leader	Ken Guild	Kevin Keenan	Derek Scott
Party	SNP	Labour	Conservative
Leader's seat	The Ferry	Strathmartine	The Ferry
Last election	13 seats, 40.0%	10 seats, 29.4%	3 seats, 12.5%
Seats before	13	10	3
Seats won	16	10	1
Seat change	▲3	Steady	▼2
Popular vote	16,704	11,612	4,340
Percentage	43.4%	30.1%	11.3%
Swing	▲3.4%	▲0.7%	▼1.2%
	Fourth party	Fifth party
Leader	Fraser Macpherson	Ian Borthwick
Party	Liberal Democrats	Independent
Leader's seat	West End	Strathmartine
Last election	2 seats, 11.3%	1 seat, 3.0%
Seats before	2	2
Seats won	1	1
Seat change	▼1	Steady
Popular vote	3,461	1,709
Percentage	9.0%	4.4%
Swing	▼2.3%	▲1.4%
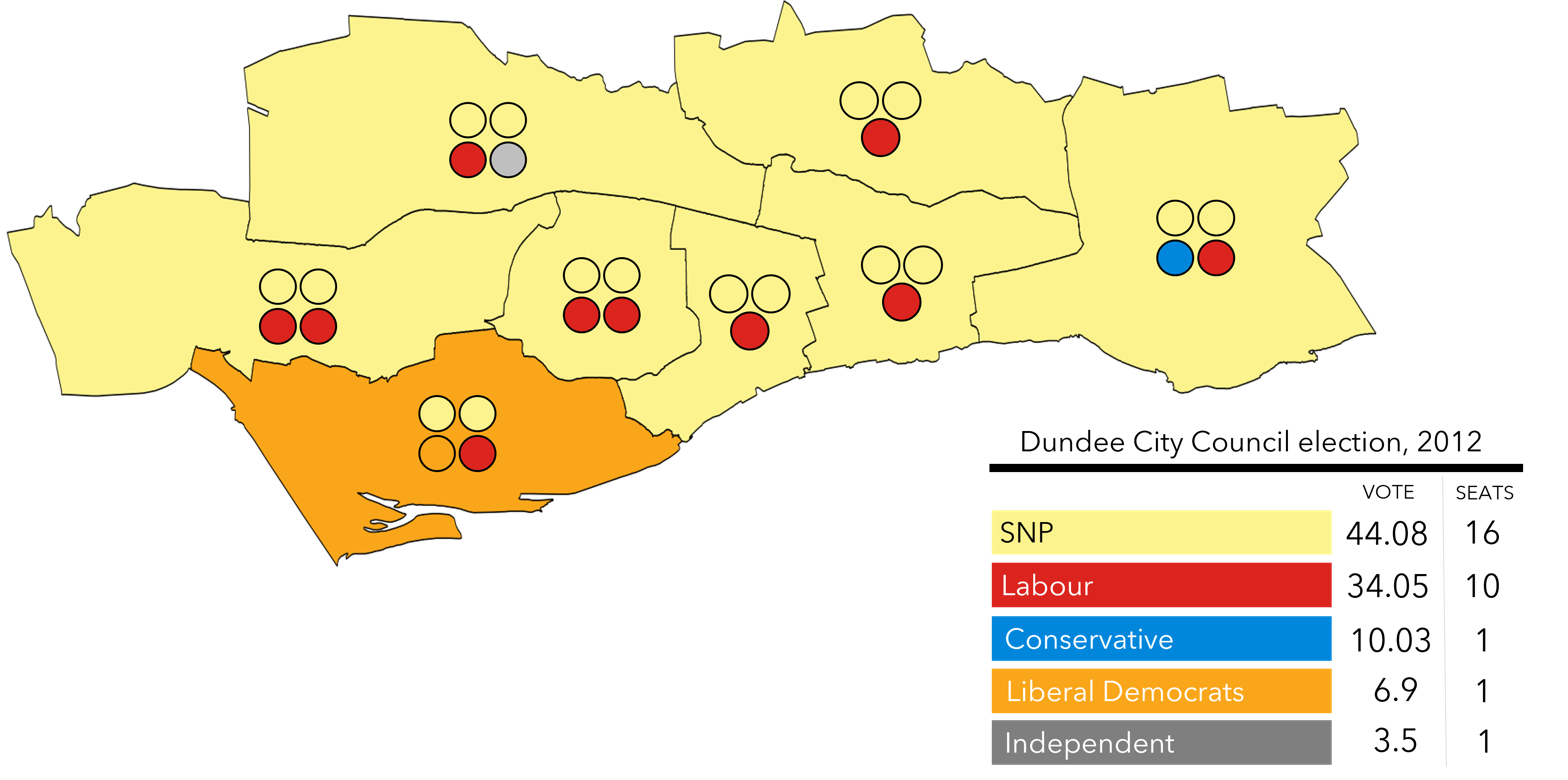
- The 8 multi-member wards

Council Leader before election
Ken Guild
SNP
Council Leader after election
Ken Guild
SNP

Elections to Dundee City Council were held on 3 May 2012 on the same day as the other Scottish local government elections. The election used the eight wards created as a result of the Local Governance (Scotland) Act 2004, with each ward electing three or four Councillors using the single transferable vote system form of proportional representation, with 29 Councillors elected.

After the 2007 Election a Labour-Lib Dem Coalition was formed. This administration subsequently collapsed in 2009 as a result of a by-election loss, and an SNP minority administration was formed.

The 2012 election saw the Scottish National Party gain 3 seats and secure an overall majority on the Council. Labour retained their 10 seats on the Council while both the Conservatives and the Liberal Democrats were reduced to a single Councillor. A single Independent was also elected.

== Results ==
2012 Dundee City Council election result
Party	Seats	Gains	Losses	Net gain/loss	Seats %	Votes %	Votes	+/−
SNP	16	3	0	▲3	55.2	43.4	16,704	▲3.4
Labour	10	0	0	Steady	34.5	30.1	11,612	▲0.7
Conservative	1	0	2	▼2	3.5	11.3	4,340	▼1.2
Liberal Democrats	1	0	1	▼1	3.5	9.0	3,461	▼2.3
Independent	1	0	0	Steady	3.5	4.4	1,709	▲1.4
TUSC	0	0	0	Steady	0.0	1.3	488	New
Scottish Green	0	0	0	Steady	0.0	0.6	217	Steady

Note: "Votes" are the first preference votes. The net gain/loss and percentage changes relate to the result of the previous Scottish local elections on 3 May 2007. This may differ from other published sources showing gain/loss relative to seats held at dissolution of Scotland's councils.

== Ward results ==
=== Strathmartine ===
- 2007: 1xSNP; 1xIndependent; 1xLab; 1xLib Dem
- 2012: 2xSNP; 1xLab; 1xIndependent
- 2007-2012 Change: SNP gain one seat from Lib Dem

Strathmartine - 4 seats
Party	Candidate	FPv%	Count								
Party	Candidate	FPv%	1	2	3	4	5	6	7	8	9
SNP	John Alexander	23.47%	1,245								
Labour	Kevin Keenan (incumbent)	20.78%	1,102								
Independent	Ian Borthwick (incumbent)	19.78%	1,049	1,057.4	1,061.7						
SNP	Stewart Hunter (incumbent)	14.22%	754	909.9	910.9	911.1	917.6	939.2	942.3	1,016.6	1,221.4
Liberal Democrats	Iliyan Stefanov	10.89%	578	583.6	584.8	584.9	596.9	605.9	651	708.9	
Labour	John McKiddie	6.62%	351	354.8	385.1	385.2	390.3	406.3	419.3		
Conservative	Colin Stewart	1.83%	97	97.3	97.3	97.3	100.4	101.4			
TUSC	Jim McFarlane	1.51%	80	81.2	82.3	82.3	90.3				
Independent	Grant Simmons	0.90%	48	48.7	48.9	49					
Electorate: 14,285 Valid: 5,304 Spoilt: 133 Quota: 1,061 Turnout: 5,437 (37.13%)

=== Lochee ===
- 2007: 2xSNP; 2xLab
- 2012: 2xSNP; 2xLab
- 2007-2012 Change: No change

Lochee - 4 seats
Party	Candidate	FPv%	Count								
Party	Candidate	FPv%	1	2	3	4	5	6	7	8	9
SNP	Bob Duncan (incumbent)	31.57%	1,594								
Labour	Tom Ferguson (incumbent)	25.91%	1,308								
SNP	Alan Ross (incumbent)	14.78%	746	1,220.4							
Labour	Norma McGovern	12.32%	622	650.9	889.2	914.1	914.6	934.9	965.7	997.2	1,149.8
Independent	Scott Campbell	7.41%	374	394.5	404.5	432.3	434.7	453.5	480.6	577.9	
Conservative	Lewis Anderson	4.89%	247	253.2	254.8	257.4	260.1	274.4	275.9		
TUSC	Rory Malone	1.6%	81	87.6	97.2	109.8	110	113.8			
Liberal Democrats	Eildh Jayne Conacher	1.23%	62	70	73.9	78.4	89.9				
Liberal Democrats	Joe Derry Setch	0.3%	15	16.5	17.6	20.5					
Electorate: 13,439 Valid: 5,049 Spoilt: 164 Quota: 1,010 Turnout: 5,213 (37.57%)

=== West End ===
- 2007: 1xLib Dem; 1xLab; 1xSNP; 1xCon
- 2012: 2xSNP; 1xLib Dem; 1xLab
- 2007-2012 Change: SNP gain one seat from Con

West End - 4 seats
Party	Candidate	FPv%	Count						
Party	Candidate	FPv%	1	2	3	4	5	6	7
Liberal Democrats	Fraser MacPherson (incumbent)	32.33%	1,453						
SNP	Bill Campbell	21.43%	963						
Labour	Richard McCready (incumbent)	20.85%	937						
Conservative	Donald Hay (incumbent)	10.32%	464	606.2	608.7	612.5	614.8	666.5	
SNP	Vari McDonald	9.15%	411	518.1	571.6	578.1	590.4	723.7	837.6
Scottish Green	Pauline Hinchion	4.83%	217	335.9	339.2	347.8	374.4		
TUSC	Raymond Mennie	1.1%	49	65	65.5	69.2			
Electorate: 12,910 Valid: 4,494 Spoilt: 77 Quota: 899 Turnout: 4,571 (34.81%)

=== Coldside ===
- 2007: 2xSNP; 2xLab
- 2012: 2xSNP; 2xLab
- 2007-2012 Change: No change

Coldside - 4 seats
Party	Candidate	FPv%	Count			
Party	Candidate	FPv%	1	2	3	4
SNP	Jimmy Black (incumbent)††	29.76%	1,536			
Labour	Mohammed Asif (incumbent)	21.06%	1,087			
Labour	Helen Wright (incumbent)	19.07%	984	1,000	1,032.7	1,069.9
SNP	Dave Bowes (incumbent)	16.16%	834	1,281.7		
Conservative	James Clancy	4.92%	254	258.6	269.3	270.6
Liberal Democrats	Raymond Alexander Lawrie	2.65%	137	138.9	151.8	153.9
Independent	Andy McBride	2.56%	132	134.9	151.6	152.9
Independent	Stuart Winton	2.05%	106	110.6	120	120.8
TUSC	Wayne Scott	1.76%	91	92.6	100.5	101.1
Electorate: 14,404 Valid: 5,161 Spoilt: 160 Quota: 1,033 Turnout: 5,321 (35.83%)

=== Maryfield ===
- 2007: 2xSNP; 1xLab
- 2012: 2xSNP; 1xLab
- 2007-2012 Change: No change

Maryfield - 3 seats
Party	Candidate	FPv%	Count						
Party	Candidate	FPv%	1	2	3	4	5	6	7
SNP	Ken Lynn (incumbent)	34.57%	1,187						
Labour	Georgia Cruickshank	18.11%	622	634.7	643.9	644.1	675.6	736.5	1,334.7
Labour	George McIrvine	18.32%	629	640.1	650.1	650.2	673	713.9	
SNP	Craig Melville (incumbent)†	16.28%	559	840.8	859.9				
Conservative	Stephen MacSporran	7.25%	249	253.7	253.7	253.7	296.3		
Liberal Democrats	Christopher Hall	3.67%	126	129.6	136.9	136.9			
TUSC	Derek Milligan	1.81%	62	64.8					
Electorate: 11,555 Valid: 3,434 Spoilt: 93 Quota: 859 Turnout: 3,527 (29.72%)

=== North East ===
- 2007: 2xSNP; 1xLab
- 2012: 2xSNP; 1xLab
- 2007-2012 Change: No change

North East - 3 seats
Party	Candidate	FPv%	Count	
Party	Candidate	FPv%	1	2
SNP	Gregor Murray	33.51%	1,143	
Labour	Brian Gordon (incumbent)	27.79%	948	
SNP	Willie Sawers (incumbent)	24.57%	838	1,096.3
Labour	Stephen Massey	8.53%	291	300.4
Conservative	Robert Lindsay	2.87%	98	101.3
TUSC	Sinead Daly	1.2%	41	42
Liberal Democrats	Jennifer Rankin	0.9%	32	35.6
Liberal Democrats	Iqbal Mohammad	0.6%	20	21.3
Electorate: 10,781 Valid: 3,411 Spoilt: 92 Quota: 853 Turnout: 3,503 (31.64%)

=== East End ===
- 2007: 2xSNP; 1xLab
- 2012: 2xSNP; 1xLab
- 2007-2012: No change

East End - 3 seats
Party	Candidate	FPv%	Count				
Party	Candidate	FPv%	1	2	3	4	5
SNP	Will Dawson (incumbent)	32.32%	1,322				
Labour	Lesley Brennan	23.57%	964	972.6	985.5	1,001.8	1,023.5
SNP	Christina Roberts (incumbent)	21.20%	867	1,125.1			
Labour	Martin Keenan	12.47%	510	518.8	528.2	540.7	564.2
Conservative	Wendy Anderson	5.77%	236	239.4	243.4	252.9	278.1
Liberal Democrats	Allan Petrie	2.62%	107	111.7	118.8	131	
TUSC	Linda Rose	2.05%	84	87.6	97.2		
Electorate: 11,787 Valid: 4,090 Spoilt: 143 Quota: 1,023 Turnout: 4,233 (34.7%)

=== The Ferry ===
- 2007: 2xCon; 1xSNP; 1xLab
- 2012: 2xSNP; 1xCon; 1xLab
- 2007-2012 Change: SNP gain one seat from Con

The Ferry - 4 seats
Party	Candidate	FPv%	Count				
Party	Candidate	FPv%	1	2	3	4	5
Conservative	Derek Scott (incumbent)	22.46%	1,704				
SNP	Ken Guild (incumbent)	19.04%	1,445	1,456.9	1,606.4		
SNP	Kevin Malcolm Cordell	16.61%	1,260	1,265.1	1,378.9	1,451.8	1674
Labour	Laurie Bidwell (incumbent)	16.57%	1,257	1,267.3	1,465.4	1,469.6	1,768.2
Conservative	Rod Wallace (incumbent)	13.06%	991	1,109.1	1,383.3	1,388.5	
Liberal Democrats	Craig Robertson Duncan	12.27%	931	949.6			
Electorate: 15,782 Valid: 7,588 Spoilt: 96 Quota: 1,518 Turnout: 7,684 (48.08%)

== Aftermath ==
=== Maryfield by-election ===
On 16 January 2016 SNP Cllr Craig Melville was suspended from the party and became an independent. He resigned his Council seat on 5 February 2016 and a by-election was held in the Maryfield ward on 31 March 2016 which was won by the SNP's Lynne Short.

Maryfield By-election (31 March 2016) - 1 Seat
Party	Candidate	FPv%	Count		
Party	Candidate	FPv%	1	2	3
SNP	Lynne Short	49.5%	1,383	1,389	1,399
Labour	Alan Cowan	22.7%	634	637	648
Conservative	James Clancy	10.5%	294	304	317
TUSC	Stuart Fairweather	5.1%	142	147	161
Scottish Green	Jacob Ellis	4.1%	116	118	123
Liberal Democrats	Christopher McIntyre	3%	85	87	92
Independent	Brian McLeod	2.6%	73	81	
UKIP	Calum Walker	2.5%	69		
Electorate: 11,669 Valid: 2,796 Spoilt: 28 Quota: 1,399 Turnout: 2,824 (24.2%)
