= Dundee House =

Present headquarters of Dundee City Council

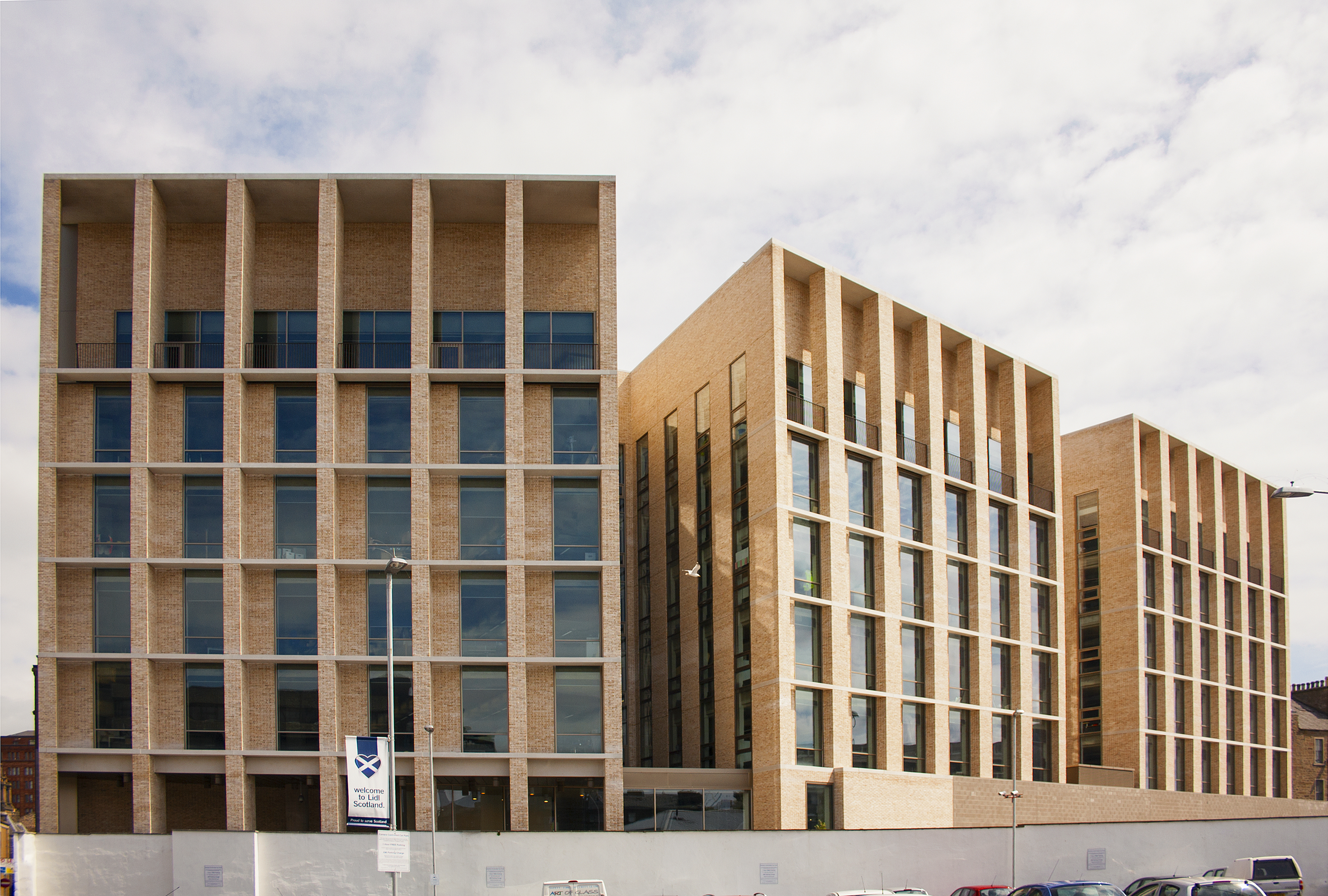
- The three blocks erected behind the original structure
- Interactive map of the Dundee House area

General information
- Type: Office block
- Location: Dundee, 50 North Lindsay Street, Dundee, DD1 1QE, Dundee, Scotland
- Coordinates: 56.4603°N 2.9756°W
- Current tenants: Dundee City Council
- Completed: 1911
- Owner: Canada Life

Design and construction
- Architects: Harry Thomson (original) / Reiach and Hall (redevelopment)

Listed Building – Category B
- Official name: 38 North Lindsay Street, 8-12 (Even Nos) South Ward Road, Former Halley Brothers' Works
- Designated: 30 March 1995
- Reference no.: LB25489

Dundee House is a municipal building in North Lindsay Street in Dundee, Scotland. The original part of the structure, which currently serves as the administrative headquarters of Dundee City Council, is Category B listed.

== History ==
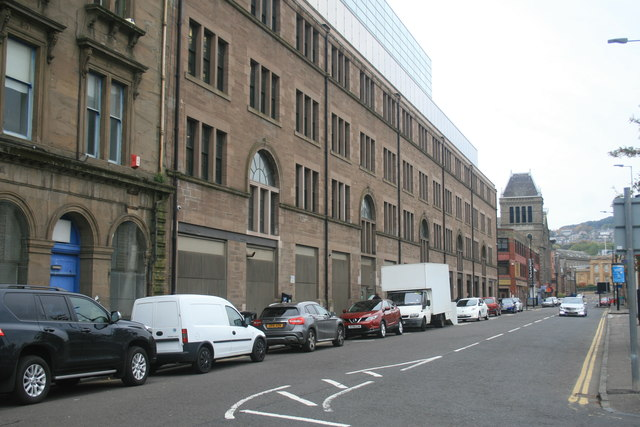
The North Lindsey Street frontage

The site occupied by the building, on the west side of North Lindsay Street, was quarried in the first half of the 19th century. It was then reclaimed in the early 20th century for the purpose of erecting a factory for Halley Brothers, who were manufacturers of hackles, gills and pins for the textile industry.

The building was designed by Harry Thomson, built in sandstone and was completed in 1911. It was later used as a printing works for DC Thomson. The design involved a symmetrical main frontage of 15 bays facing onto North Lindsey Street. There were a series of openings on the ground floor, while the first floor was fenestrated by a series of tri-partite mullioned windows interspersed with Diocletian windows. The second and third floors were fenestrated entirely by tri-partite mullioned windows.

In the early 21st century, the factory was acquired by Dundee City Council with the intention of creating a new administrative headquarters to replace Tayside House. A new structure, consisting of three six-storey interconnected blocks, was erected behind the original structure. The new structure was designed by Reiach and Hall, built by Lendlease using brick piers and concrete slabs at a cost of £29 million, and was officially opened in August 2011. The project won two prestigious architecture awards: a Royal Institute of British Architects award for architectural excellence and the best commercial office/building or project outside London in the Roses Design Awards.

Canada Life acquired the building in a sale and leaseback deal in August 2019.
