= Mark Flynn =

Scottish politician

Councillor Mark Flynn

Leader of Dundee City Council
- Incumbent
- Assumed office 2 September 2024
- Preceded by: John Alexander

Councillor of Dundee City Council for Coldside
- Incumbent
- Assumed office 4 May 2017

Personal details
- Born: Dundee, Scotland
- Party: Scottish National Party
- Children: Stephen Flynn

Mark Gerard Flynn is a Scottish politician. He is a Scottish National Party (SNP) councillor and the Leader of Dundee City Council. Following the announcement of John Alexander's resignation as leader of Dundee City Council, Flynn was announced as the new leader of the SNP group at Dundee City Council.

== Early career ==
Flynn worked as an engineer for the Japanese company JEOL .

== Political career ==
=== Councillor for Coldside ===
Flynn first entered local government during the 2017 elections, where he secured a strong mandate with 1,560 votes, accounting for 27% of the vote in the Coldside ward. His was later re-elected in the 2022 elections, where he won 1,275 votes on second preferences.

Throughout his tenure as a councillor, Flynn has held several key positions, most notably as the convener of the City Development Committee. In this role, he has been at the forefront of several major initiatives, particularly those focused on sustainability and climate action.

=== Leader of Dundee City Council (2024–present) ===
Flynn was selected as the SNP group leader at Dundee City Council on 12 August 2024, following the resignation of John Alexander. After being elected as group leader, Flynn stated that he "intends to stand up for Dundee and its people at every opportunity, without fear or favour" and that he would "lead with an open mind and an open door".

Flynn assumed the role of leader of Dundee City Council on 2 September 2024 after a vote by councillors.

== Personal life ==
Flynn's son Stephen is the SNP member of the Scottish parliament (MSP) for Aberdeen Deeside and North Kincardine. He was previously Member of Parliament (MP) for Aberdeen South and leader of the SNP at Westminster. In November 2024, Flynn revealed that he had cancer and was undergoing treatment.
