= 2007 Dundee City Council election =

2007 Scottish local government election

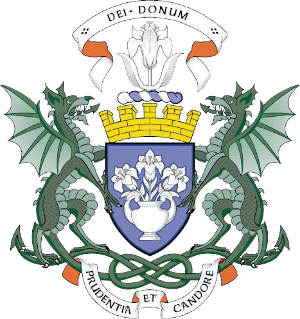
- 3 May 2007

All 29 seats to Dundee City Council 15 seats needed for a majority
	First party	Second party	Third party
Leader	Ken Guild	Kevin Keenan	Derek Scott
Party	SNP	Labour	Conservative
Leader's seat	The Ferry	Strathmartine	The Ferry
Last election	11 seats, 34.1%	10 seats, 34.1%	5 seats, 14.9%
Seats before	11	10	5
Seats won	13	10	3
Seat change	▲2	Steady	▼2
	Fourth party	Fifth party
Leader	Fraser Macpherson	Ian Borthwick
Party	Liberal Democrats	Independent
Leader's seat	West End	Strathmartine
Last election	2 seats, 10.0%	1 seat, 3.5%
Seats before	2	1
Seats won	2	1
Seat change	Steady	Steady
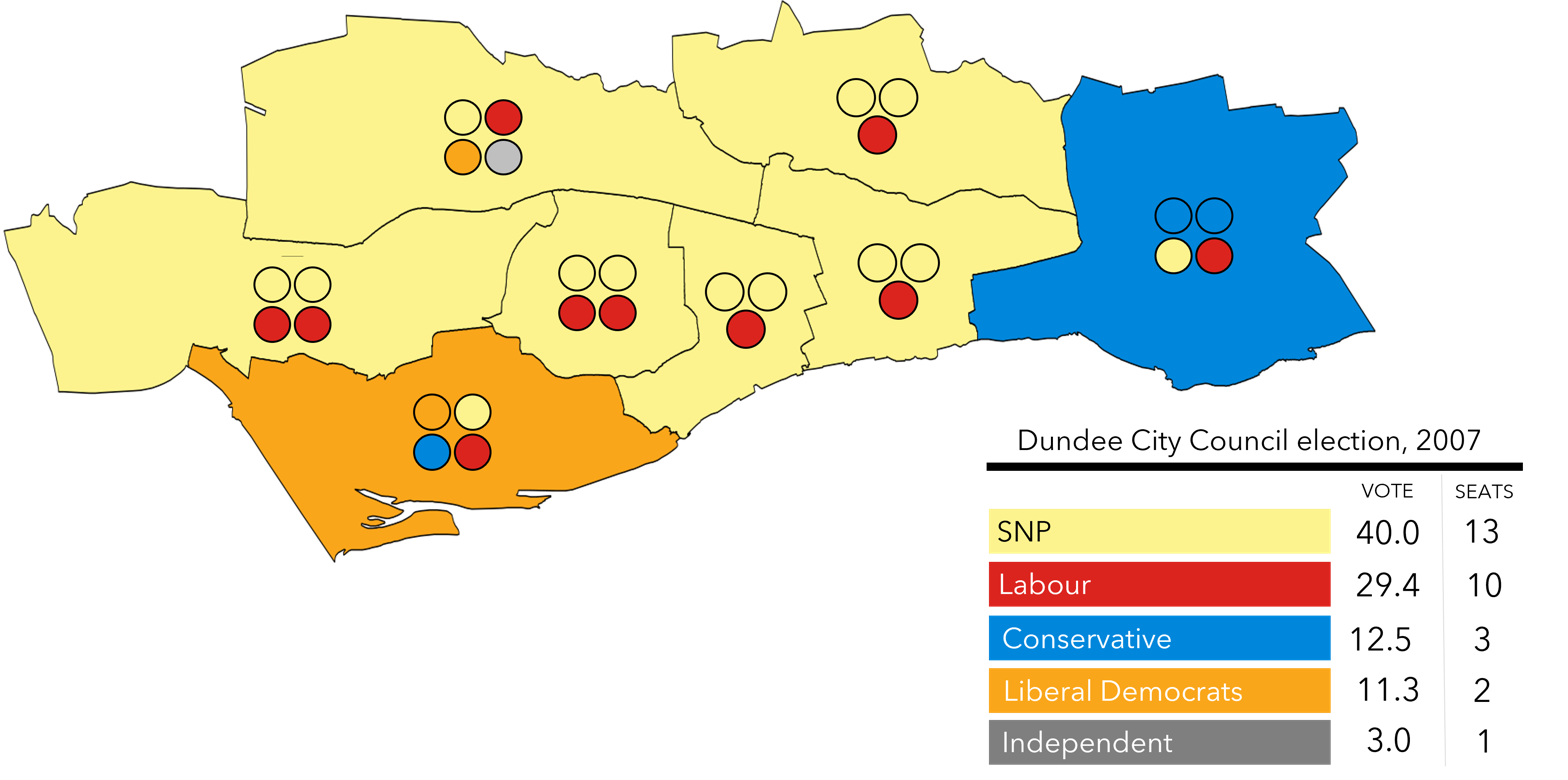
- The 8 multi-member wards

Elections to Dundee City Council were held on 3 May 2007, the same day as the other Scottish local government elections and the Scottish Parliament general election.

The election was the first one to use the new 8 wards created as a result of the Local Governance (Scotland) Act 2004, each ward will elect three or four councillors using the single transferable vote system form of proportional representation. The new wards replace 29 single-member wards which used the plurality (first past the post) system of election.

The SNP had the largest number of seats but the council was initially controlled by a Labour and Liberal Democrat coalition, with the support of the Conservatives. This changed after a March 2009 by-election result tipped the balance in the SNPs favour.

== Results ==
2007 Dundee City Council election result
Party	Seats	Gains	Losses	Net gain/loss	Seats %	Votes %	Votes	+/−
SNP	13	-	-	▲2	44.8	40.0	20,804	▲5.9
Labour	10	-	-	Steady	34.5	29.4	15,294	▼4.7
Conservative	3	-	-	▼2	10.3	12.5	6,516	▼2.4
Liberal Democrats	2	-	-	Steady	6.9	11.3	5,878	▲1.3
Independent	1	-	-	Steady	3.5	3.0	1,582	▼0.5
Solidarity	0	-	-	Steady	0.0	1.9	1,002	New
Scottish Socialist	0	-	-	Steady	0.0	1.3	664	▼2.2
Green	0	-	-	Steady	0.0	0.6	307	New

== Ward results ==
=== Strathmartine ===
2007 Council election: Strathmartine (4 seats)
Party	Candidate	FPv%	%	Seat	Count
SNP	Stewart Hunter	1,612	23.4	1	1
Independent	Ian Borthwick	1,472	21.3	2	1
Labour	Kevin Keenan	1,219	17.7	3	7
Liberal Democrats	Helen Dick	959	13.9	4	9
SNP	Wendy Wrieden	725	10.5		
Labour	John McKiddie	534	7.7		
Conservative	Martyn Geddes	186	2.7		
Solidarity	Jim McFarlane	120	1.7		
Scottish Socialist	Alan Boylan	75	1.1		
Turnout		6,902	50.41		

=== Lochee ===
2007 Council election: Lochee (4 seats)
Party	Candidate	FPv%	%	Seat	Count
SNP	Nigel Don	2,216	31.1	1	1
Labour	John Letford†	1,385	19.4	3	3
SNP	Bob Duncan	1,142	16.0	2	2
Labour	Tom Ferguson	940	13.2	4	9
Liberal Democrats	Chris Hall	479	6.7		
Conservative	Philip Varghese	369	5.2		
Labour	Chris Hind	297	4.2		
Solidarity	Neil Bell	218	3.1		
Scottish Socialist	Alan Albert Graham	83	1.2		
Turnout		5,744	52.36		

=== West End ===
2007 Council election: West End (4 seats)
Party	Candidate	FPv%	%	Seat	Count
Liberal Democrats	Fraser MacPherson	1,693	28.0	1	1
Labour	Richard McCready	1,331	22.0	2	1
SNP	James Walker Barrie	1,326	21.9	3	1
Conservative	Donald Hay	738	12.2	4	8
SNP	Chic Brodie	495	8.2		
Green	George Alexander Burton	307	5.1		
Solidarity	Luke Ivory	95	1.6		
Scottish Socialist	Angela Gorrie	69	1.1		
Turnout		6,054	49.55		

=== Coldside ===
2007 Council election: Coldside (4 seats)
Party	Candidate	FPv%	%	Seat	Count
SNP	James Black	1,740	24.2	1	1
Labour	Helen Wright	1,320	18.3	2	7
SNP	Dave Bowes	1,033	14.4	3	7
Labour	Mohammed Asif	849	11.8	4	10
Liberal Democrats	Murray Dick	779	10.8		
Labour	David Cowan	774	10.8		
Conservative	Margaret Stewart	351	4.9		
Solidarity	Sinead Daly	141	2.0		
Scottish Socialist	Mary McGregor	128	1.8		
Independent	Stuart Winton	80	1.1		
Turnout		7,195	50.30		

=== Maryfield ===
2007 Council election: Maryfield (3 seats)
Party	Candidate	FPv%	%	Seat	Count
SNP	Elizabeth Fordyce	1,247	25.3	1	1
Labour	Joe Morrow	1,172	23.8	2	5
SNP	Ken Lynn	941	19.1	3	8
Liberal Democrats	Claire Matthew	644	13.1		
Conservative	John McCraw	410	8.3		
Labour	Alex Perry	339	6.9		
Scottish Socialist	Grant Cromar	96	1.9		
Solidarity	Mark Walker	83	1.7		
Turnout		4,932	46.21		

=== North East ===
2007 Council election: North East (3 seats)
Party	Candidate	FPv%	%	Seat	Count
SNP	Andy Dawson	1,956	41.4	1	1
Labour	Brian Gordon	1,392	29.5	2	1
SNP	Willie Sawers	612	13.0	3	5
Labour	Shane Trevor Mochrie-Cox	208	4.4		
Conservative	Gladys Ross	184	3.9		
Liberal Democrats	Donald Ross MacDonald	162	3.4		
Scottish Socialist	Helen Mary Fortune	92	1.9		
Solidarity	Leah Ganley	83	1.8		
Independent	Raymond Anthony Mennie	30	0.6		
Turnout		4,719	45.33		

=== East End ===
2007 Council election: East End (3 seats)
Party	Candidate	FPv%	%	Seat	Count
SNP	William Dawson	1,980	34.3	1	1
Labour	George Regan	957	16.6	3	8
Labour	George McIrvine	913	15.8		
SNP	Christina Roberts	810	14.0	2	6
Liberal Democrats	Allan Petrie	529	9.2		
Conservative	Roberta Mackie	325	5.6		
Solidarity	Jim Malone	208	3.6		
Scottish Socialist	Heather Ferguson	56	1.0		
Turnout		5,778	49.39		

=== The Ferry ===
2007 Council election: The Ferry (4 seats)
Party	Candidate	FPv%	%	Seat	Count
SNP	Ken Guild	2,400	25.7	1	1
Labour	Laurie Bidwell	1,664	17.8	2	5
Conservative	Derek Scott	1,604	17.2	3	8
Conservative	Rod Wallace	1,211	13.0	4	8
Conservative	Charlie Webster	1,138	12.2		
Liberal Democrats	Raymond Lawrie	633	6.8		
SNP	Robert Piggot	569	6.1		
Scottish Socialist	Alasdair Brydie Robertson Stewart	65	0.7		
Solidarity	Philip Stott	54	0.6		
Turnout		9,338	61.82		

== Changes Since 2007 Election ==
- †On 24 March 2009, Lochee Cllr John Letford became an Independent after leaving the Labour Party

== By-Elections (since 3 May 2007) ==
A by-election was held in the Lochee ward on 22 November 2007, following the resignation of Nigel Don MSP, subsequent to his election to the Scottish Parliament. The seat was retained by the party's Alan Ross

Lochee By-Election (22 November 2007) - 1 seat
Party	Candidate	FPv%	Count			
Party	Candidate	FPv%	1	2	3	4
SNP	Alan Ross	48.9	2,005	2,020	2,028	2,055
Labour	George McIrvine	34.0	1,395	1,412	1,432	1,448
Liberal Democrats	Christopher Hall	10.6	435	437	446	500
Conservative	Martyn R N Geddes	3.8	154	156	161	
Solidarity	Neil Bell	1.4	57	65		
Scottish Socialist	Alan Albert Graham	1.3	55			
Electorate: 13,991 Valid: 4,071 Spoilt: 40 Quota: 2,051 Turnout: 4,101 (29.24%)

A by-election was held in the Maryfield ward on 12 March 2009, following the resignation of Labour Cllr Joe Morrow, subsequent to his appointment by the Scottish Government as president of the Mental Health Tribunal for Scotland. The seat was won by the SNP's Craig Melville

Maryfield By-Election (12 March 2009) - 1 seat
Party	Candidate	FPv%	Count					
Party	Candidate	FPv%	1	2	3	4	5	6
SNP	Craig Melville	47.6	1,550	1,551	1,557	1,571	1,620	1,747
Labour	George McIrvine	31.1	1,013	1,018	1,021	1,031	1,052	1,189
Liberal Democrats	Chris Hall	10.9	354	356	362	367	455	
Conservative	Colin Stewart	6.9	224	226	237	241		
Scottish Socialist	Angela Gorrie	1.6	52	52	55			
Independent	Grant Simmons	1.1	35	48				
Independent	Dave Young	0.9	28					
Electorate: 11,195 Valid: 2,607 Spoilt: 34 Quota: 1,629 Turnout: 3,290 (29.39%)
