= John Alexander (councillor) =

Scottish politician

Councillor John Alexander
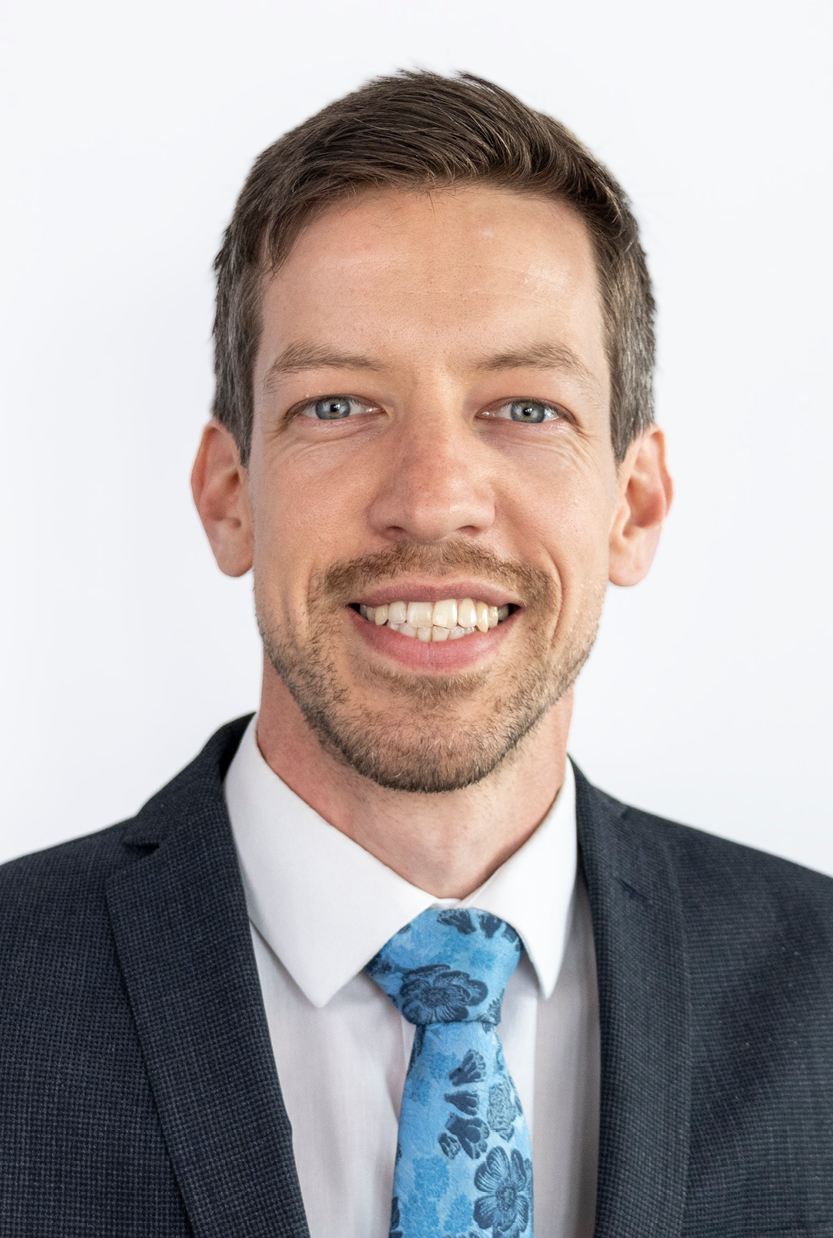
- Official Portrait 2022, John Alexander

Leader of Dundee City Council
- In office 22 May 2017 – 30 August 2024
- Preceded by: Ken Guild
- Succeeded by: Mark Flynn

Councillor of Dundee City Council for Strathmartine Ward 1
- In office 3 May 2012 – 30 August 2024
- Preceded by: Helen Dick

Personal details
- Born: June 1988 (age 38) Dundee, Scotland
- Party: Scottish National Party
- Spouse: Sarah Alexander (m. 2014)
- Children: 2
- Education: University of Dundee

John Alexander (born June 1988) is a Scottish SNP politician who was formerly a councillor for Strathmartine Ward 1 from 2012 to 2024. Alexander also served as the Leader of Dundee City Council from 2017 to 2024.

John Alexander was first elected to the Strathmartine Ward (Ward 1) in the 2012 Scottish council election with 1245 first preference votes, becoming Dundee's youngest ever serving councillor at 23 years old.

In the 2017 election, he was re-elected with an increase in first preference votes of 57%. Alexander subsequently became Leader of Dundee City Council after striking a deal to form an administration with veteran councillor, Ian Borthwick.

Following the SNP's success in the 2022 Dundee City Council election, Alexander was returned to the role of Leader of Dundee City Council after securing a majority administration. This is currently the only majority SNP administration in Scotland.

Alexander announced his intention to resign as council leader and as a councillor in August 2024. On 12 August 2024, it was revealed that Mark Flynn, the father of SNP Westminster leader, Stephen Flynn, would be elected as his successor. Alexander formally resigned on 30 August 2024, with Flynn assuming the role on 2 September 2024.

== Education ==
Alexander was educated at St Saviour's Roman Catholic High School in Dundee between 2000 and 2006. The school has since closed.

He attended the University of Dundee, initially studying Law (Scots) LL.B and latterly graduating with a Master of Arts in Politics & International Relations.

== Career ==
Following his election in 2012, Alexander held the role of Depute Convener of Housing within the majority SNP Council Administration. He was Depute to the then Convener of the Department, Councillor Jimmy Black.

Following Councillor Black's resignation from the post in 2013, Alexander assumed the role of Convener of the Housing Department, a post which he held until it was merged with the Environment Department in 2016.

In March 2016, Alexander became the first Convener of the newly created Neighbourhood Services Committee which was formed following the amalgamation of the Housing Department, Environment Department and Communities Section.

=== First term (2017–2022) ===
He held this post until his appointment as Leader of Dundee City Council in May 2017. Alexander was appointed Chairman of the Scottish Cities Alliance in September 2017 and has held the position since. Alexander announced his intention to stand for re-election as leader of Dundee City Council and was confirmed as a candidate on 11 March 2022.

=== Second term (2022–2024) ===
Alexander was subsequently re-elected in the Strathmartine ward, winning the most votes in the first preference and getting elected at the first stage. With the SNP winning a majority, Alexander secured a second term as leader of Dundee City Council after an election on 23 May 2022.

Alexander supported the development of the National Strategy for Economic Transformation (NSET) as a member of the Advisory Council for Economic Transformation. The strategy sets out the priorities for Scotland’s economy as well as the actions needed to maximise the opportunities of the next decade to achieve our vision of a wellbeing economy.

==== Resignation ====
On 9 July 2024, Alexander announced his intention to resign as leader of Dundee City Council and as a councillor at the end of August, triggering a by-election and a leadership election for the Dundee SNP group.

== Awards & Acknowledgment ==
Alexander won the 'SNP Councillor of the Year' category at the inaugural SNP Independence Magazine Awards 2018.

At The Herald Scottish Politician of the Year Awards 2018, Alexander won the 'Local Politician of the Year' category.

In November 2019, Alexander was named 'Leader of the Year' by Local Government Information Unit, an influential think tank, at its annual Councillor Awards.

At The Herald Scottish Politician of the Year Awards 2022, Alexander was nominated for the 'Local Politician of the Year' category.

In November 2023, John Alexander was named 'Leader of the Year' once again, by the influential think tank Local Government Information Unit, making him the only council leader to have won the award twice.

On 24 June 2026, Alexander was awarded an honorary Doctor of Laws degree by the University of Dundee in recognition of his contributions to the city and his support for the university during his tenure.
