= Dundee City Council =

Local government body in Scotland

Dundee City Council Comhairle Baile Dhùn Dè
- Full council election every 5 years
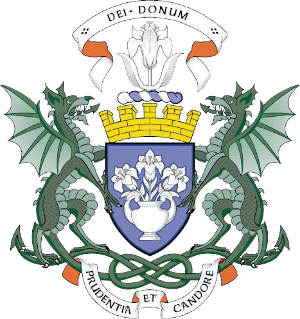
- Coat of arms

- Logo

Type
- Type: Unitary authority

History
- Preceded by: City of Dundee District Council

Leadership
- Lord Provost: Bill Campbell, SNP since 23 May 2022
- Leader: Mark Flynn, SNP since 2 September 2024
- Chief Executive: Gregory Colgan since December 2020

Structure
- Seats: 29
- Graph of the party split among 29 seats.
- Political groups: Administration (15) SNP (15) Other parties (14) Labour (8) Liberal Democrats (4) Conservative (1) Independent (1)

Elections
- Voting system: Single transferable vote
- Last election: 5 May 2022
- Next election: 6 May 2027

Meeting place
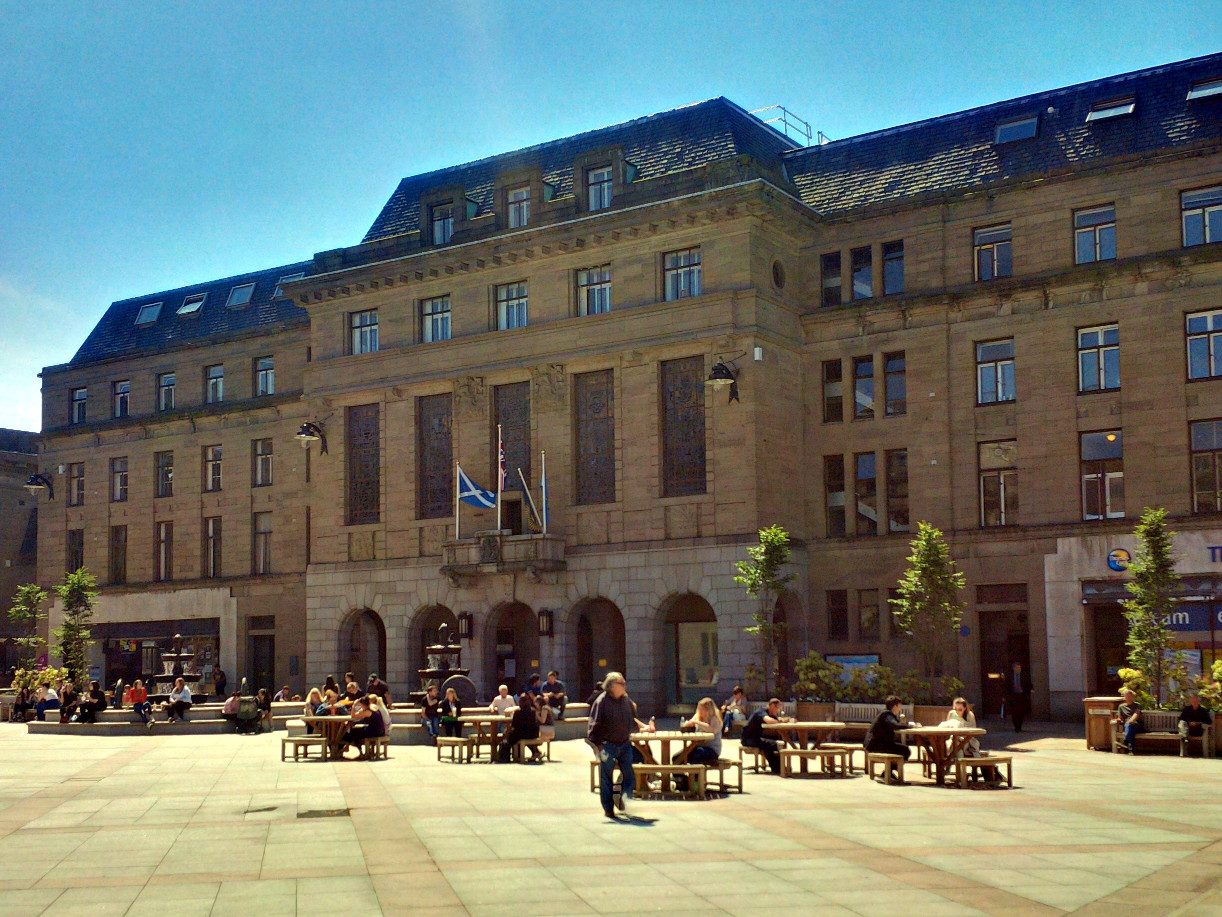
- City Chambers, 21 City Square, Dundee, DD1 3BY

Website
- www.dundeecity.gov.uk

Dundee City Council (Scottish Gaelic: Comhairle Baile Dhùn Dè) is the local authority for Dundee City, one of the 32 council areas of Scotland. In its modern form it was created in 1996. Dundee was formerly governed by a corporation from when it was made a burgh in the late twelfth century until 1975. Between 1975 and 1996 the city was governed by City of Dundee District Council, a lower-tier authority within the Tayside region.

The council has been under Scottish National Party majority control since 2022. It has its official meeting place at Dundee City Chambers and main offices at Dundee House.

== History ==
=== Dundee Corporation ===
It is not known exactly when Dundee was made a burgh, but it is believed to have been sometime between 1181 and 1195. It was then governed by a corporation until 1975. It was elevated to the status of a royal burgh in 1292. The corporation was also known as the town council until 1889, when Dundee was awarded city status, after which the corporation was also known as the city council.

From the fifteenth century, the corporation was led by a provost. In 1892 the post was given the additional honorific title of lord provost.

The city was part of Angus (then called Forfarshire) until 1894, but the functions affecting the city which operated at county level were relatively few, largely being limited to judicial functions and lieutenancy. When elected county councils were created in 1890 under the Local Government (Scotland) Act 1889, Dundee Corporation was deemed capable of running county-level local government functions, and so the city was excluded from the area administered by Forfarshire County Council. In 1894, Dundee was made a county of itself, removing it from Forfarshire for judicial and lieutenancy purposes as well.

The burgh's boundaries were enlarged on numerous occasions, notably in 1831, 1913 (when it absorbed the neighbouring burgh of Broughty Ferry plus other areas), 1922, 1932, 1939 and 1946.

=== City of Dundee District Council ===
Local government across Scotland was reorganised in 1975 under the Local Government (Scotland) Act 1973, which replaced the counties, burghs and landward districts with a two-tier system of regions and districts. One of the districts was called 'City of Dundee', which formed part of the Tayside region. The City of Dundee district covered a larger area than the pre-1975 city, taking in the burgh of Monifieth and most of the landward district of Monifieth (covering a number of villages north of Dundee) from Angus, (Note: The landward district of Monifieth comprised the parts of the parish of Monifieth which lay outside the burgh boundaries, a small rural part of the old parish of Dundee (also called Dundee Combination) which lay outside the city boundaries, and the parishes of Auchterhouse, Fowlis Easter, Kettins, Liff and Benvie, Lundie, Mains and Strathmartine, Murroes, Newtyle, and Tealing. The 1975 changes placed Kettins in Perth and Kinross and Newtyle in Angus district. The rest of the pre-1975 landward district of Monifieth was included in the City of Dundee district.) and the parish of Longforgan (which included Invergowrie) from Perthshire.

=== Dundee City Council ===
Local government was reorganised again in 1996 under the Local Government etc. (Scotland) Act 1994, which abolished the regions and districts created in 1975 and established 32 single-tier council areas across Scotland, one being the city of Dundee. The council area created in 1996 was smaller than the district which had existed between 1975 and 1996, being similar in extent to the pre-1975 city. Monifieth and the villages north of Dundee were transferred to Angus, and an area approximately matching the old parish of Longforgan was transferred to Perth and Kinross. The 1994 Act named the new council area 'City of Dundee', but this was changed to 'Dundee City' by a council resolution on 29 June 1995, before the new council area came into force, allowing the new council to take the name 'Dundee City Council'. In terms of area, it is the smallest of Scotland's council areas.

== Political control ==
The council has been under Scottish National Party majority control since 2022.

The first election to the City of Dundee District Council was held in 1974, initially operating as a shadow authority alongside the outgoing corporation until the new system came into force on 16 May 1975. A shadow authority was again elected in 1995 ahead of the reforms which came into force on 1 April 1996. Political control of the council since 1975 has been as follows:

City of Dundee District Council
Party in control	Years
No overall control	1975–1980
Labour	1980–1996

Dundee City Council
Party in control	Years
Labour	1996–1999
No overall control	1999–2012
SNP	2012–2017
No overall control	2017–2022
SNP	2022–present

=== Leadership ===
The role of Lord Provost of Dundee is largely ceremonial. They chair full council meetings and act as the council's civic figurehead. Political leadership is provided by the leader of the council. The first leader following the 1996 reforms, Kate Maclean, had been the leader of the old City of Dundee District Council since 1992. The leaders of Dundee City Council since 1996 have been:

Councillor	Party	From	To
Kate Maclean	Labour	1 Apr 1996	1999
Julie Sturrock	Labour	1999	2003
Jill Shimi	Labour	2003	May 2007
Kevin Keenan	Labour	24 May 2007	30 Mar 2009
Ken Guild	SNP	30 Mar 2009	May 2017
John Alexander	SNP	May 2017	29 Aug 2024
Mark Flynn	SNP	2 Sep 2024	

=== Composition ===
Following the 2022 election and subsequent changes of allegiance up to October 2026, the composition of the council was:

Party	Seats
SNP	15
Labour	8
Liberal Democrats	4
Conservative	1
Independent	1
Total	29

The next election is due in 2027.

== Elections ==
Since the last boundary changes in 2007 the council has comprised 29 councillors representing eight wards, with each ward electing three or four councillors under the single transferable vote system. Elections are held every five years.

Election	Result	SNP	Lab	Con	LD	Ind		
City of Dundee District Council
1988	Labour majority	4	30	10	0	0		
1992	Labour majority	6	26	12	0	0		
Dundee City Council
1995	Labour majority	3	28	4	0	1		
1999	Labour minority	10	14	4	0	1 (Note: Independent Labour)		
2003	SNP minority	11	10	5	2	1		
2007	SNP minority	13	10	3	2	1		
2012	SNP majority	16	10	1	1	1		
2017	SNP minority	14	9	3	2	1		
2022	SNP majority	15	9	1	4	0	0	0

=== Wards ===
Map of the eight wards of Dundee.

Ward number	Ward name	Location	Seats
1	Strathmartine		4
2	Lochee		4
3	West End		4
4	Coldside		4
5	Maryfield		3
6	North East		3
7	East End		3
8	The Ferry		4
Total			29

== Premises ==
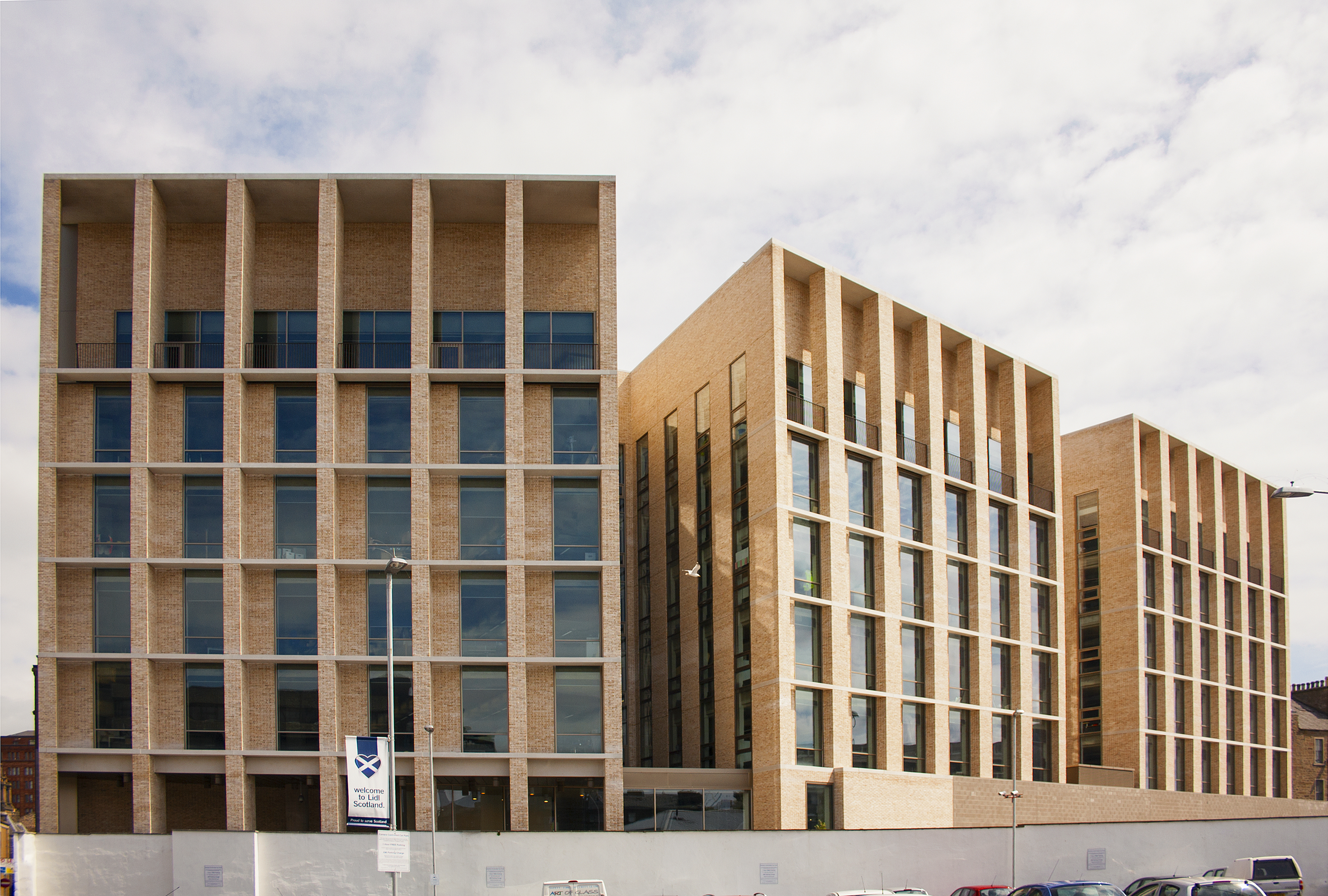
Dundee House, 50 North Lindsay Street: Modern part of building to rear.

Council meetings are held at Dundee City Chambers in City Square, built in 1933, although most meetings have been held remotely since the COVID-19 pandemic started in 2020. The council's main offices are at Dundee House at 50 North Lindsay Street. The front part of the building was built as a factory in 1911 and was later used as a printing works for DC Thomson. A modern office extension was built behind the 1911 frontage, opening as the council's main offices in 2011 to replace Tayside House which the council had inherited from the Tayside Regional Council on local government reorganisation in 1996.

== See also ==
- Politics of Dundee
