= 2017 Dundee City Council election =

2017 Scottish local government election

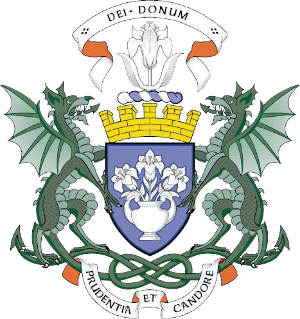
- 4 May 2017

All 29 seats to Dundee City Council 15 seats needed for a majority
- Turnout: 39.6%
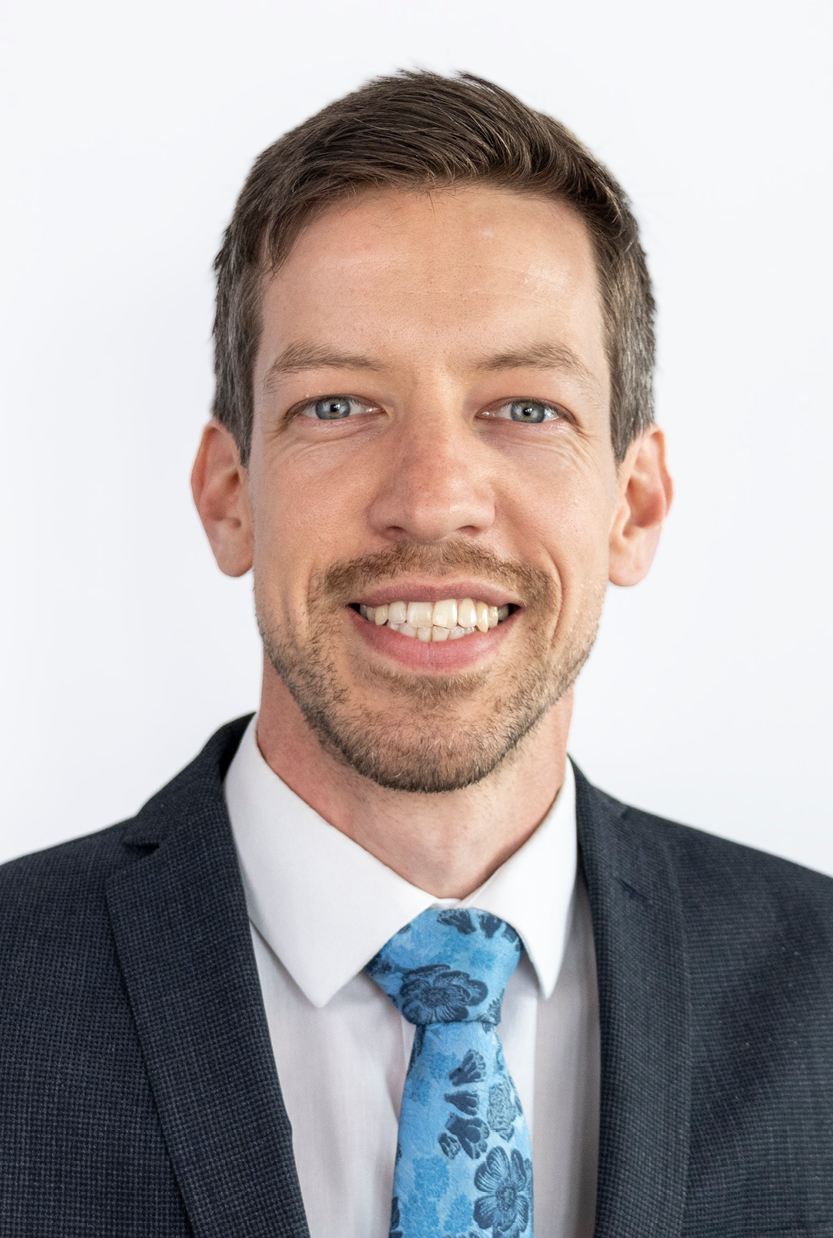
	First party	Second party	Third party
Leader	John Alexander	Kevin Keenan	Derek Scott
Party	SNP	Labour	Conservative
Leader's seat	Strathmartine	Strathmartine	The Ferry
Last election	16 seats, 43.4%	10 seats, 30.1%	1 seat, 11.3%
Seats won	14	9	3
Seat change	▼2	▼1	▲2
Popular vote	18,289	8,997	7,644
Percentage	41.3%	20.3%	17.2%
Swing	▼2.1%	▼9.8%	▲5.9%
	Fourth party	Fifth party
Leader	Fraser Macpherson	Ian Borthwick
Party	Liberal Democrats	Independent
Leader's seat	West End	Strathmartine
Last election	1 seat, 9.0%	1 seat, 4.4%
Seats won	2	1
Seat change	▲1	Steady
Popular vote	5,011	2,364
Percentage	11.3%	5.3%
Swing	▲2.3%	▲0.9%
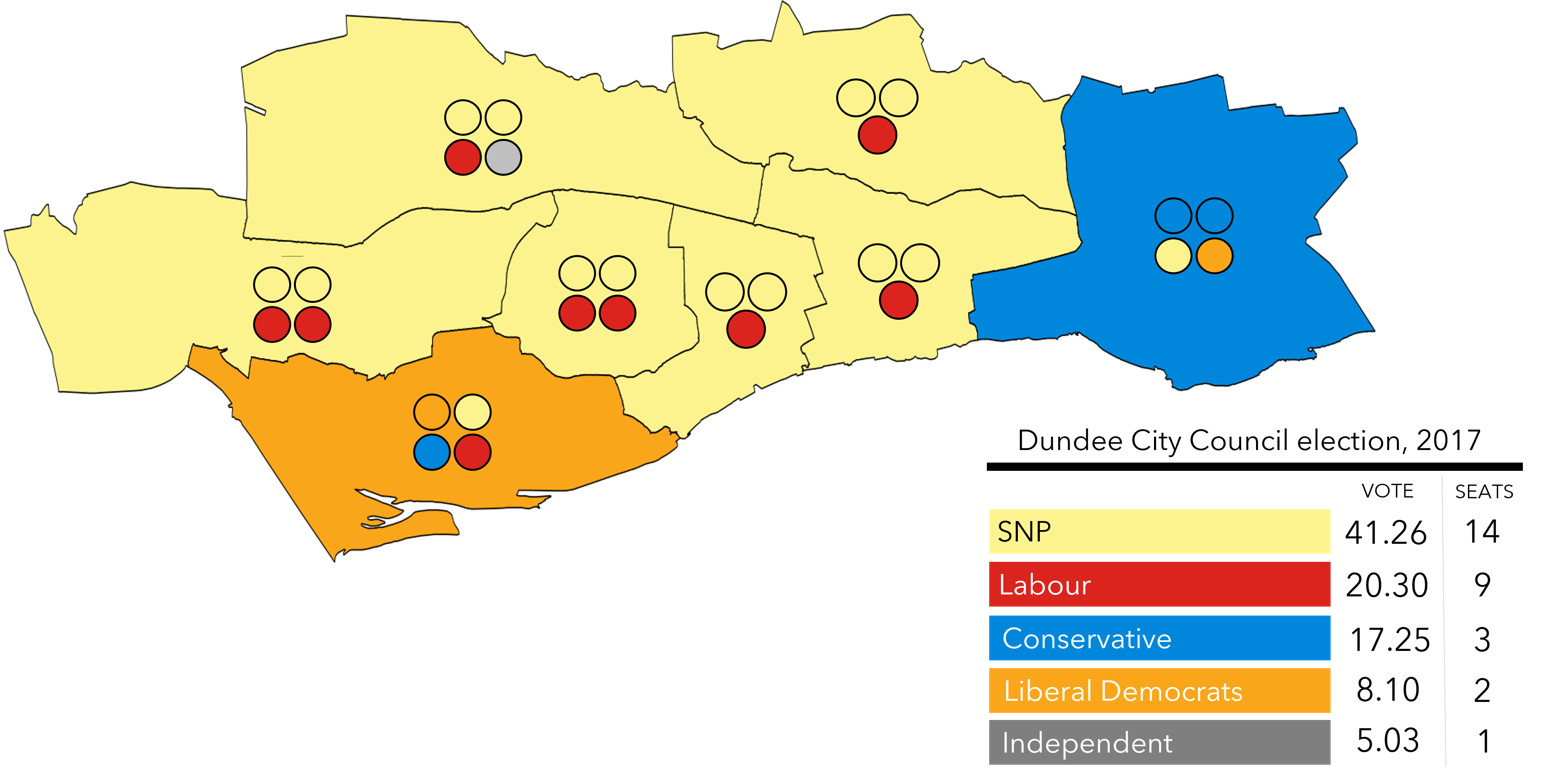
- The eight multi-member wards; colours denote the winning party, as shown in the main table of results.

Council Leader before election
Ken Guild
SNP
Elected Council Leader
John Alexander
SNP

Elections to Dundee City Council were held on 4 May 2017 on the same day as the other Scottish local government elections. The election used the eight wards created as a result of the Local Governance (Scotland) Act 2004, with each ward electing three or four Councillors using the single transferable vote system (a form of proportional representation). A total of 29 Councillors were elected.

After the 2012 election a Scottish National Party (SNP) majority administration of 16 was formed. In 2017 the SNP lost 2 seats reducing their numbers to 14, being one seat short of an overall majority. They formed an administration with the support of the Independent Ian Borthwick.

== Background ==
=== Previous election ===
At the previous election in 2012 the SNP took 16 seats and was able to form a majority administration. Labour were second with 10 and the remaining groups had 1 seat each.

Party	Seats	Vote share
SNP	16	43.4%
Labour	10	30.1%
Conservative	1	11.3%
Liberal Democrats	1	9.0%
Independent	1	4.4%

=== Composition ===
Throughout the term of the previous council, there was minimal change in the composition of members. In January 2016, Craig Melville, who was an SNP councillor for Maryfield was suspended from the party, thereby taking the number of councillors the SNP had to 15. Melville later resigned as a councillor and a by-election took place which was won back by the SNP thus resulting in the SNP returning back to 16 seats for the remainder of the term.

Party	2012 term		2017 result	
Party	Election	Dissolution	Seats	+/- (Note: Seat change from dissolution.)
SNP	16	16	14	▼2
Labour	10	10	9	▼1
Conservative	1	1	3	▲2
Liberal Democrats	1	1	2	▲1
Independent	1	1	1	Steady

=== Retiring councillors ===
Ahead of the election, seven councillors announced their retirement and would not stand for re-election, that included Bob Duncan who was Lord Provost and the council leader, Ken Guild.

Ward	Party	Retiring councillor
Coldside	SNP	Jimmy Black
Coldside	SNP	David Bowes
East End	Labour	Lesley Brennan
Lochee	SNP	Bob Duncan
Lochee	Labour	Norma McGovern
The Ferry	Labour	Laurie Bidwell
The Ferry	SNP	Ken Guild

== Results ==
2017 Dundee City Council election result
Party	Seats	Gains	Losses	Net gain/loss	Seats %	Votes %	Votes	+/−
SNP	14			▼2	48.3	41.3	18,289	▼2.1
Labour	9			▼1	31.0	20.3	8,997	▼9.8
Conservative	3			▲2	10.3	17.2	7,644	▲5.9
Liberal Democrats	2			▲1	6.9	11.3	5,011	▲2.3
Independent	1			Steady	3.5	5.3	2,364	▲0.9
Green	0	0	0	Steady	0.0	2.5	1,102	▲1.9
TUSC	0	0	0	Steady	0.0	1.6	688	▲0.3
UKIP	0	0	0	Steady	0.0	0.2	103	New
Scottish Socialist	0	0	0	Steady	0.0	0.1	59	New

Note: "Votes" are the first preference votes. The net gain/loss and percentage changes relate to the result of the previous Scottish local elections on 3 May 2012. This may differ from other published sources showing gain/loss relative to seats held at dissolution of Scotland's councils.

=== Votes summary ===
↓
14	9	3	2	1
SNP	Labour	Conservative	LD	Independent

First preference vote share
SNP	41.3%
Labour	21.0%
Conservative	17.2%
Liberal Democrats	11.3%
Independent	5.3%
Green	2.5%
Other	2.0%

Council seats
SNP	48.3%
Labour	31.0%
Conservative	10.3%
Liberal Democrats	6.9%
Independent	3.5%

=== Ward summary ===
Results of the 2017 Dundee City Council election by ward
Ward	%	Seats	%	Seats	%	Seats	%	Seats	%	Seats	%	Seats	Total
Ward	SNP		Lab		Conservative		Lib Dems		Independent		Others		Total
Strathmartine	43.2%	2	18.9%	1	9.0%	0	13.6%	0	13.5%	1	1.7%	0	4
Lochee	42.7%	2	29.3%	2	12.1%	0	2.1%	0	9.7%	0	4.1%	0	4
West End	28.6%	1	11.6%	1	11.8%	1	38.5%	1	2.4%	0	9.6%	0	4
Coldside	44.2%	2	27.9%	2	11.0%	0	2.8%	0	8.6%	0	5.6%	0	4
Maryfield	49.4%	2	21.6%	1	17.6%	0	5.3%	0			6.1%	0	3
North East	53.7%	2	27.0%	1	9.1%	0	1.3%	0	5.8%	0	3.0%	0	3
East End	53.3%	2	21.7%	1	12.9%	0	2.5%	0	4.6%	0	5.0%	0	3
The Ferry	29.9%	1	11.7%	0	38.9%	2	15.8%	1			3.6%	0	4
Total	41.3%	14	20.3%	9	17.3%	3	11.3%	2	5.3%	1	4.6%	0	29

== Ward results ==
=== Strathmartine ===
- 2012: 2xSNP; 1xLab; 1xIndependent
- 2017: 2xSNP; 1xLab; 1xIndependent
- 2012-2017 Change: No Change

Strathmartine - 4 seats
Party	Candidate	FPv%	Count						
Party	Candidate	FPv%	1	2	3	4	5	6	7
SNP	John Alexander (incumbent)	32.1%	1,956						
Labour	Kevin Keenan (incumbent)	18.9%	1,155	1,178.7	1,182.9	1,220.9			
Liberal Democrats	Daniel Coleman	13.6%	828	866	869.5	884.5	884.8	1,076.9	
Independent	Ian Borthwick (incumbent)	13.5%	825	876.5	883.3	911.9	912.2	1,085.4	1,641.1
SNP	Stewart Hunter (incumbent)	11.2%	680	1,250.05					
Conservative	Robert Lindsay	9.0%	546	549.8	550.1	555.2	555.3		
TUSC	Sinead Daly	1.7%	105	115.2	118.7				
Electorate: 15,017 Valid: 6,095 Spoilt: 139 Quota: 1,220 Turnout: 6,234 (41.5%)

=== Lochee ===
- 2012: 2xSNP; 1xLab; 1x independent
- 2017: 2xSNP; 2xLab
- 2012-2017: Labour Gain from independent

Lochee - 4 seats
Party	Candidate	FPv%	Count									
Party	Candidate	FPv%	1	2	3	4	5	6	7	8	9	10
SNP	Alan Ross (incumbent)	28.6%	1,661									
Labour	Charlie Malone	15.9%	924	933.3	940.3	943.7	959.9	993.4	1,020.9	1,217.7		
SNP	Roisin Smith	14.1%	818	1,256.9								
Labour	Michael Marra	13.4%	778	785.5	793.2	794.5	812.8	819.4	848.4	968.5	1,012.5	1,241.8
Conservative	Mason Mcilreavy	12.1%	700	702.4	703.9	708.2	724.5	728.5	739.2	813.2	814.9	
Independent	Tom Ferguson (incumbent)	9.7%	565	574.3	582.4	584.4	597.5	623.6	673.4			
Green	Gordon Matheson	2.3%	132	137.4	163.6	166.2	185.8	206.5				
TUSC	Leah Ganley	1.8%	102	104.1	108.06	110.06	112.2					
Liberal Democrats	Lynn Hutchison	1.6%	91	91.6	92.2	106.5						
Liberal Democrats	Kirsty McKenzie	0.5%	31	32.5	35.1							
Electorate: 14,276 Valid: 5,802 Spoilt: 163 Quota: 1,161 Turnout: 5,965 (41.8%)

=== West End ===
- 2012: 2xSNP; 1xLib Dem; 1xLab
- 2017: 1xLib Dem; 1xSNP; 1xCon; 1xLab
- 2012-2017: Conservative gain one seat from SNP

West End - 4 seats
Party	Candidate	FPv%	Count							
Party	Candidate	FPv%	1	2	3	4	5	6	7	8
Liberal Democrats	Fraser MacPherson (incumbent)	38.5%	2,105							
SNP	Bill Campbell (incumbent)	19.9%	1,090	1,210.9						
Conservative	Donald Hay	11.8%	643	887.2	888.5	889.5	901.3	929.8	958.6	987.2
Labour	Richard McCready (incumbent)	11.6%	637	876.9	883.6	889.2	904.04	932.9	1,078.6	1,416.7
SNP	Steven Rome	8.7%	474	506.6	597.5	611.1	623.5	637.1	838.8	
Green	Morgan Petrie	6.1%	331	432.2	439.5	472.7	495.1	515.9		
Independent	Andrew McBride	1.2%	67	118.3	119.6	123.09	136.9			
Independent	Bradley Booth	1.2%	65	93.8	95.1	96.7				
Scottish Socialist	Tam Wilson	1.1%	59	66.2	66.9					
Electorate: 12,959 Valid: 5,471 Spoilt: 67 Quota: 1,095 Turnout: 5,538 (42.7%)

=== Coldside ===
- 2012: 2xSNP; 2xLab
- 2017: 2xSNP; 2xLab
- 2012-2017: No Change

Coldside - 4 seats
Party	Candidate	FPv%	Count									
Party	Candidate	FPv%	1	2	3	4	5	6	7	8	9	10
SNP	Mark Flynn	27.7%	1,560									
Labour	George McIrvine	16.6%	933	951.4	959.5	965.4	974.7	996.08	1,059.9	1,223.9		
SNP	Anne Rendall	16.5%	925	1,252.9								
Labour	Helen Wright (incumbent)	11.3%	633	638.02	647.9	650.5	664.04	677.9	725.9	843.7	908.9	1,139.8
Conservative	Duncan Shaw	11.0%	618	621.07	622.1	625.4	628.4	657.5	663.9	709.8	715.1	
Independent	Mohammed Asif (incumbent)	8.6%	481	495.2	504.07	505.1	510.3	529.2	615.8			
Green	Conor Marshall	4.1%	232	252.4	291.6	295.2	327.9	351.1				
Liberal Democrats	Kristopher Hall	1.8%	101	106.02	108.8	139.1	141.2					
TUSC	Wayne Scott	1.5%	82	84.8	90.7	93.9						
Liberal Democrats	Christopher McIntyre	1.0%	57	60.9	62.3							
Electorate: 14,262 Valid: 5,622 Spoilt: 229 Quota: 1,125 Turnout: 5,851 (41%)

=== Maryfield ===
- 2012: 2xSNP; 1xLab
- 2017: 2xSNP; 1xLab
- 2012-2017: No change

Maryfield - 3 seats
Party	Candidate	FPv%	Count				
Party	Candidate	FPv%	1	2	3	4	5
SNP	Ken Lynn (incumbent)	30.3%	1,240				
Labour	Georgia Cruickshank (incumbent)	21.6%	885	894.8	902.9	968.3	1,051.9
SNP	Lynne Short (incumbent)	19.1%	782	968.2	972.9	997.4	1,084.3
Conservative	James Clancy	17.6%	722	722.8	726.9	775.9	792.9
TUSC	Stuart Fairweather	6.1%	250	253.3	253.5	270.8	
Liberal Democrats	Jenny Blain	4.1%	168	169.2	194.7		
Liberal Democrats	Robbie McKaig	1.2%	48	49.6			
Electorate: 12,021 Valid: 4,095 Spoilt: 89 Quota: 1,024 Turnout: 4,184 (34.8%)

=== North East ===
- 2012: 2xSNP; 1xLab
- 2017: 2xSNP; 1xLab
- 2012-2017: No Change

North East - 3 seats
Party	Candidate	FPv%	Count	
Party	Candidate	FPv%	1	2
SNP	Gregor Murray†† (incumbent)	32.8%	1,256	
Labour	Brian Gordon† (incumbent)	26.9%	1,033	
SNP	Willie Sawers (incumbent)	20.9%	800	1,057.6
Conservative	Curtis Large	9.1%	350	351.4
Independent	Alan Beddows	5.8%	223	229.2
Green	Alison Orr	1.6%	62	71
TUSC	Michael Taylor	1.6%	52	56.5
Liberal Democrats	Tracy Mulholland	1.3%	50	51.9
Electorate: 11,337 Valid: 3,826 Spoilt: 98 Quota: 957 Turnout: 3,924 (34.6%)

=== East End ===
- 2012: 2xSNP; 1xLab
- 2017: 2xSNP; 1xLab
- 2012-2017: No Change

East End - 3 seats
Party	Candidate	FPv%	Count							
Party	Candidate	FPv%	1	2	3	4	5	6	7	8
SNP	Will Dawson (incumbent)	38.6%	1,553							
Labour	Margaret Richardson	24%	965	982.7	986.5	993.5	1,004.1	1,047.1	1,089.7	1,177.9
SNP	Christina Roberts (incumbent)	20.2%	811	1,144.2						
Conservative	Darren Kane	14.2%	571	575.6	576.2	585.5	589.5	619.7	630.3	677.2
Independent	Darryl Guthrie	5.1%	205	217.3	219.2	225.3	237.3	252.6	303.5	
Green	Caitlin Meldrum	2.8%	113	124.1	132.1	133.4	145.5	165.3		
Liberal Democrats	Ryan Finnegan	2.7%	110	120.8	122.2	126.5	137.8			
UKIP	William Morren	1.4%	56	58.3	58.9					
TUSC	Ian McKay	1.3%	54	64.8	66.7	68.9				
Electorate: 12,113 Valid: 4,019 Spoilt: 562 Quota: 1,110 Turnout: 4,581 (37.8%)

=== The Ferry ===
- 2012: 2xSNP; 1xCon; 1xLab
- 2017: 2xCon; 1xLib Dem; 1xSNP
- 2012-2017: Conservative & Lib Dem each gain one seat from Labour & SNP.

The Ferry - 4 seats
Party	Candidate	FPv%	Count								
Party	Candidate	FPv%	1	2	3	4	5	6	7	8	9
Conservative	Derek Scott (incumbent)	31.8%	2,859								
SNP	Kevin Cordell (incumbent)	17.9%	1,608	1,616.9	1,618.9	1,622.9	1,684.9	1,809.8			
Liberal Democrats	Craig Duncan	15.8%	1,422	1,498.6	1,502.6	1,509.3	1,557.4	1,967.8			
SNP	Vari McDonald *	12.0%	1,075	1,079.5	1,084.5	1,085.5	1,139.8	1,230.6	1,260.8	1,272.8	
Labour	Angela Lyall	11.7%	1,054	1,079.3	1,093.3	1,097.3	1,139.7				
Conservative	Philip Scott	7.1%	635	1,532.9	1,534.6	1,556.5	1,566.4	1,679.9	1,732.6	1,732.7	2,013.7
Green	Pol Clementsmith	2.6%	232	237.2	247.9	249.9					
UKIP	Calum Walker	0.52%	47	50.7	52.7						
TUSC	Paul Johnson	0.48%	43	44.9							
Electorate: 16,062 Valid: 8,975 Spoilt: 831 Quota: 1,796 Turnout: 9,153 (57%)

- = Outgoing Councillor from a different ward.

== Aftermath ==
- † In February 2019, North East Labour Cllr. Brian Gordon died after a short illness. A by-election took place on 2 May 2019 which was won by Steven Rome of the SNP.
- On 15 May 2019, North East SNP Cllr. Gregor Murray resigned from the party, accusing the party of being institutionally transphobic. Cllr. Murray continues to serve the ward as an independent.
- On 11 May 2021, Lochee SNP Cllr Alan Ross resigned from the party and became an independent. On 4 February 2022, he joined the Alba Party, becoming the first Alba councillor in Dundee.

=== North East by-election ===
In February 2019, North East Labour Cllr. Brian Gordon died after a short illness. A by-election took place on 2 May 2019 which was won by Steven Rome of the SNP.

North East by-election (2 May 2019) - 1 seat
Party	Candidate	FPv%	Count					
Party	Candidate	FPv%	1	2	3	4	5	6
SNP	Steven Rome	46.9%	1,507	1,510	1,534	1,555	1,576	2,045
Labour	Jim Malone	38.1%	1,224	1,229	1,248	1,284	1,388	
Conservative	Robert Lindsay	8.4%	271	274	280	290		
TUSC	Michael Taylor	2.8%	91	109	122			
Green	Alison Orr	2.4%	77	82				
CF	Roger Keech	1.4%	45					
Electorate: 11,434 Valid: 3,215 Spoilt: 31 Quota: 1,608 Turnout: 28.4%
