= John Letford =

British politician

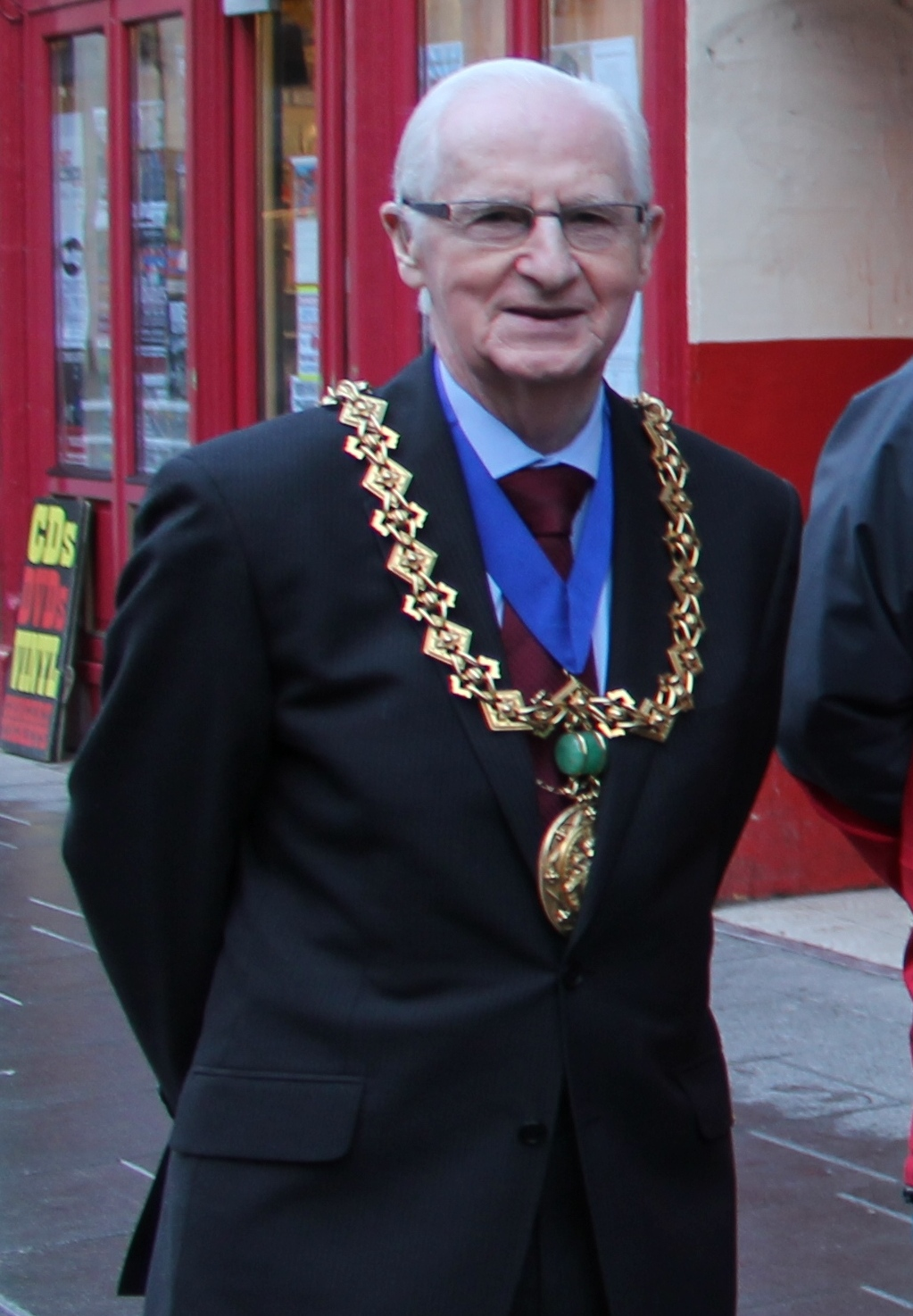
- Letford in 2011

Lord Provost of Dundee
- In office 2001–2012
- Preceded by: Helen Wright
- Succeeded by: Bob Duncan

Personal details
- Born: 5 March 1935 (age 91) Aberdeen, Scotland

John Ross Letford MBE (born 5 March 1935) is a Scottish politician who served as the Lord Provost of Dundee, as well as a councillor in his local ward of Lochee, until May 2012. His eleven years as Lord Provost made him the longest serving civic head in the United Kingdom since the nineteenth century. He currently resides in the Charleston area of the city.

Born in Aberdeen, he moved to Dundee in 1943 and later served an apprenticeship in the Caledon Shipbuilding & Engineering Company shipyard as a marine coppersmith. He also served in the Royal Air Force from 1956 until 1958.

In 1989 he began working as a training manager with Community Industry Rathbone, where he remained for 15 years before becoming a councillor in the Tayside Regional Council and Labour Party Chairman for Camperdown.

He has served on several committees with matters concerning sports, theatre, education, local services and disabled associations and has been involved with Dundee City Council since 1994 where before being elected as Lord Provost in June 2001, in succession to Helen Wright, who was voted out of office because of a dispute over her expenses. He was elected by a vote of 15–11 over Scottish National Party candidate David Bowes, winning backing from three Conservative councillors. Previously he had held the post of Deputy Lord Provost. Letford was re-elected as Lord Provost after the 2007 Scottish local elections and again after the 2007 Scottish local elections.

On 24 March 2009, Letford resigned from the Labour Group on Dundee City Council, and became an independent councillor.

Letford was appointed Member of the Order of the British Empire (MBE) in the 2012 Birthday Honours for services to local government. He launched his autobiography in 2016.
