= Ken Guild =

Scottish politician

Councillor Ken Guild

Leader of Dundee City Council
- In office 2009–2017
- Preceded by: Kevin Keenan
- Succeeded by: John Alexander

Personal details
- Party: Scottish National Party

Ken Guild is a former Scottish National Party politician and former leader of Dundee City Council. As councillor for The Ferry ward, he led the Scottish National Party group on the Council and up until May 2017 held the position of Leader of the Council.

He was first elected in the 2007 Scottish local elections, topping the poll in the ward with 2,400 first preferences. On this occasion he failed to bring in a running mate with him but was elected Leader of the Opposition. In June 2009 the SNP won a by-election in the Maryfield ward at the expense of the Scottish Labour Party. With the support of former Labour member John Letford, the SNP were able to form an administration to run the Council. Guild was elected Council Leader at this time.

In the 2012 Scottish local elections, Guild was re-elected in his ward, polling 1,445 first preferences, and taking the second seat after transfers. On this occasion his transfers helped elect Cllr Kevin Cordell, his running-mate. This seat gain was at the expense of the Scottish Conservative and Unionist Party and was one of three net gains that the SNP made in 2012 which gave the party an overall majority in Dundee for the first time. This was also the first time that the SNP had majority control of a Scottish city. Guild was again elected Council Leader after the local elections.
