= Ian Borthwick =

Scottish politician

Councillor Ian Borthwick MBE

Lord Provost of Dundee
- In office 22 May 2017 – 5 May 2022
- Preceded by: Bob Duncan

Lord Provost of Dundee

Personal details
- Born: Dundee, Scotland
- Party: Independent

Ian Borthwick MBE is a former independent politician — initially a member of the Labour Party — who served in local government starting in 1963, and was Lord Provost of Dundee between 2017 and 2022.

He was Scotland's longest-serving councillor and Dundee's oldest politician, having celebrated fifty years in local government in June 2013. He was first elected to Dundee Town Council in 1963, then joined Tayside Regional Council in 1975 and Dundee City Council in 1996.

In 2017, Borthwick became Lord Provost of Dundee at the age of 78, following an agreement which saw the SNP group on the council form a minority administration.

In 2022, Borthwick retired after sixty years as a councillor and five years as the city's lord provost.
