= Overgate =

Overgate or The Overgate may refer to:

- Overgate Centre, a shopping centre in Dundee, Scotland
  - Overgate (former Dundee street), former street in Dundee, replaced by the Overgate Centre during the 1960s
- V9 Overgate, part of the Milton Keynes grid road system
- Overgate Hospice, a hospice in Halifax, West Yorkshire
  - Overgate Hospice Choir, a choir based in Halifax, West Yorkshire which raises money for the Overgate Hospice
- The Overgate (folk song), a folk song with Roud number 866
