= Claverhouse =

Residental area in Dundee, Scotland

Coordinates: 56.493°N 2.965°W

Claverhouse: Barns of Claverhouse
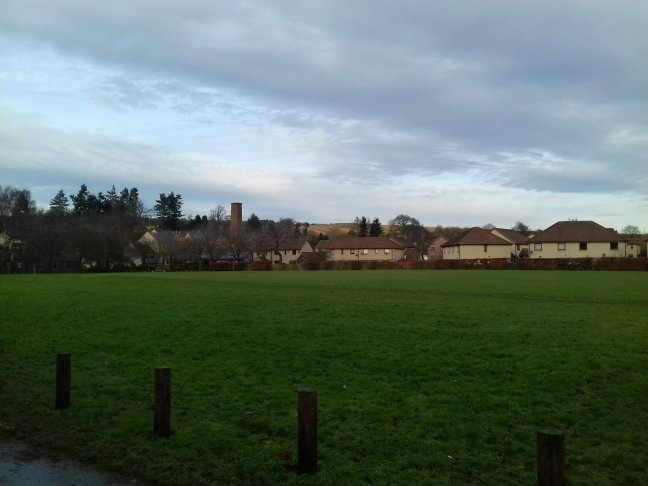

- Location within Dundee City council area Location within Scotland
- OS grid reference: NO4033
- Council area: Dundee City
- Lieutenancy area: Dundee
- Country: Scotland
- Sovereign state: United Kingdom
- Post town: DUNDEE
- Postcode district: DD4
- Dialling code: 01382
- Police: Scotland
- Fire: Scottish
- Ambulance: Scottish
- UK Parliament: Dundee East
- Scottish Parliament: Dundee City East

Claverhouse is a residential area located on the northern outskirts of Dundee, Scotland, with the city centre located 2 miles (3.2 km) from the area.

Claverhouse is primarily an affluent residential area and is one of the wealthier areas in Dundee alongside Broughty Ferry and the West End of Dundee. The area is surrounded by natural parkland, reservoirs and a burn and is a popular area for golf and equestrianism. High end housing communities which feature houses and villas are located within the area.

The Dighty Burn runs past Claverhouse from the west underneath a bridge and continues to flow to the east. Located near to Claverhouse is Mains Castle and Caird Park as well as the A90 road northbound to Aberdeen through Forfar Road.

Up north from the area is the nearby Barns of Claverhouse, where local farmhouses and animals are located. It is accessible from Barns of Claverhouse Road and through the pathway into and past the Emmock Woods housing community.

== History ==
=== Early history ===
John Graham of Claverhouse (1648–1689), known to history as "Bonnie Dundee" or "Bluidy Clavers" by his supporters and detractors respectively, was the laird of Claverhouse. The Graham family, including John Graham, owned the area of Claverhouse in the 1600s. References to John Graham and his viscountcy were used for street names as part of the Claverhouse Braes community.

=== Bleachworks site ===
The Claverhouse Bleachworks factory opened in the late 1770s and closed in the 1970s. Claverhouse Bleachfield had a chimney and a counting house which housed a bell and a clock tower. The bell has been removed although the clock tower and the chimney of the bleachwork factory still stand in Claverhouse.

The nearby Trottick Ponds were used for the Claverhouse Bleachworks factory as a power source.

=== Present day ===
By the late 20th century, the Claverhouse Industrial Park was built, situated on Forfar Road to the east of the residential area, is one of Dundee’s main business and employment centres. The site was developed in the late 20th century as part of wider efforts to diversify the city’s economy following the decline of traditional industries such as jute and heavy manufacturing. Built on former farmland and open ground, the park was intended to attract light industry, warehousing and service-sector employers to the north of the city. Today it contains a mixture of industrial units, storage facilities and offices. The industrial park continues to provide commercial space that supports employment and economic activity in Dundee.

By the turn of the 21st century, some of the former bleachworks factory site was converted into housing. Further residential communities such as Claverhouse Braes, Claver Mill, Emmock Woods and Dalclaverhouse were constructed in Claverhouse from the late 1990s to the early 2020s, with some of the street names in the area paying homage to its history.

== Governance ==
Claverhouse is in the North East ward of Dundee City Council, it is represented by Steven Rome and Willie Sawers of the Scottish National Party and Jax Finnegan of the Scottish Labour Party. The area is part of Dundee City West which is represented by Joe FitzPatrick in the Scottish Parliament, and in Dundee East which is represented by Stewart Hosie in the UK Parliament.

== Education ==
Claverhouse is the location of one primary school, Mill of Mains Primary School, which opened in October 1972 and three nurseries, one being part of the primary school.

The nearest secondary school is St. Paul's R.C. Academy which is only a few minutes from the area, however Baldragon Academy is also located nearby and serves as a catchment school for Mill of Mains Primary School.

== Recreation ==
Claverhouse offers a variety of recreational facilities catering to residents and visitors with a park, play area and gym facilities.

=== Claverhouse Park ===
Claverhouse Park is a green space which features a football pitch, popular with sports and outdoor activities. The park is frequently used by dog walkers and families. Additionally, an outdoor gym and fitness area is located to the south of Claverhouse Park. It is accessible through Barns of Claverhouse Road.

==== Mill of Mains Play Area ====
Located slightly south, the Mill of Mains Play Area serves as an extension of the park. An original play area and basketball pitch opened in the 1990s, with more additional amenities opening in the late 2010s. The play area offers recreational space for both Claverhouse and the neighbouring Mill of Mains area.

=== Claverhouse Equestrian Centre ===
The Claverhouse Equestrian Centre is situated in the northern part of Claverhouse, within the Emmock Woods housing community. The centre provides horse riding facilities and training opportunities.

== Transport ==
Public transport in the area is quite limited compared to other areas in the Dundee due to it being quite remote and small. Buses, however, do come to the area with direct routes to the city centre via the 18 and direct routes to Kirriemuir and Forfar via the 21D. The 14S and 17S routes, which are school bus routes for pupils at St. Paul's R.C. Academy, the closest school to the area, stop at Claverhouse. The 10 route directly goes to Broughty Ferry, stopping at Claypotts Road. The 18 route was extended to accommodate Claverhouse in 2021. The 236 bus route used to stop at Claverhouse up until the service was axed in 2024. Ember also run a service which stops near Claverhouse Industrial Park, opposite Mill of Mains.

Bus routes
Bus route	Primary destinations	Bus stops	Service provider
10	Ninewells Hospital; Broughty Ferry	John Grahame Avenue	Xplore Dundee
18	City Centre	John Grahame Avenue; Middleton Crescent	Xplore Dundee
14S; 17S	St. Paul's R.C. Academy	Claverhouse Road (Trottick Mains)	Xplore Dundee
21D	Kirriemuir; Forfar	Claverhouse Road (Trottick Mains)	Stagecoach East Scotland

== Gallery ==
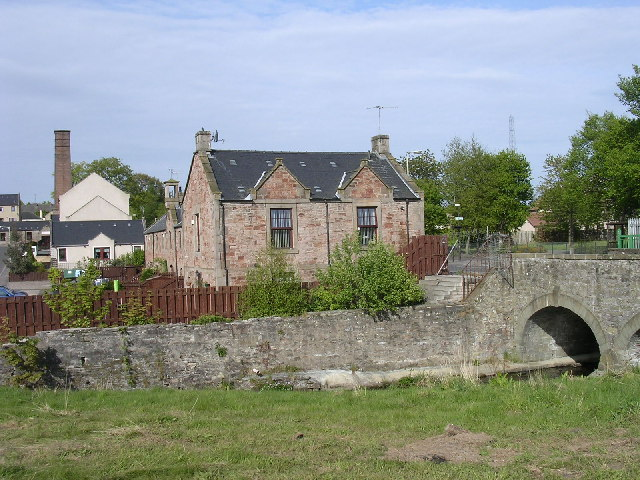
Claverhouse pictured in 2005.

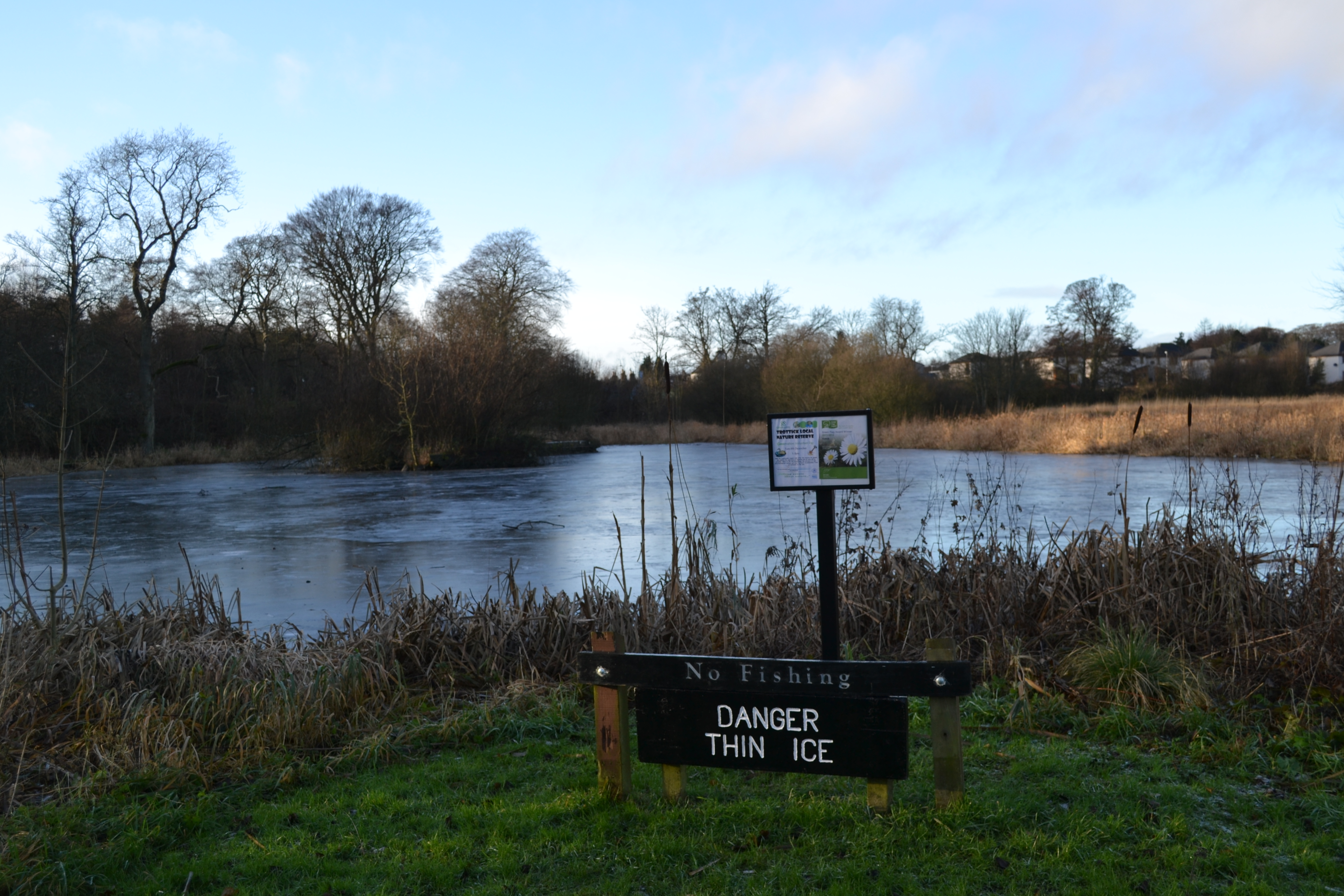
The nearby Trottick Mill Ponds which were once used to help run the former bleachworks factory.
