= Peter Royston =

Peter Royston may refer to:

- Peter Royston (choreographer) (born 1952), British dancer, choreographer, teacher and director
- Peter Royston (bishop) (1836–1915), former Bishop of Mauritius
