= Mill of Mains =

Area of Dundee, Scotland

Coordinates: 56.4892°N 2.9546°W

Mill of Mains: Mill o' Mains
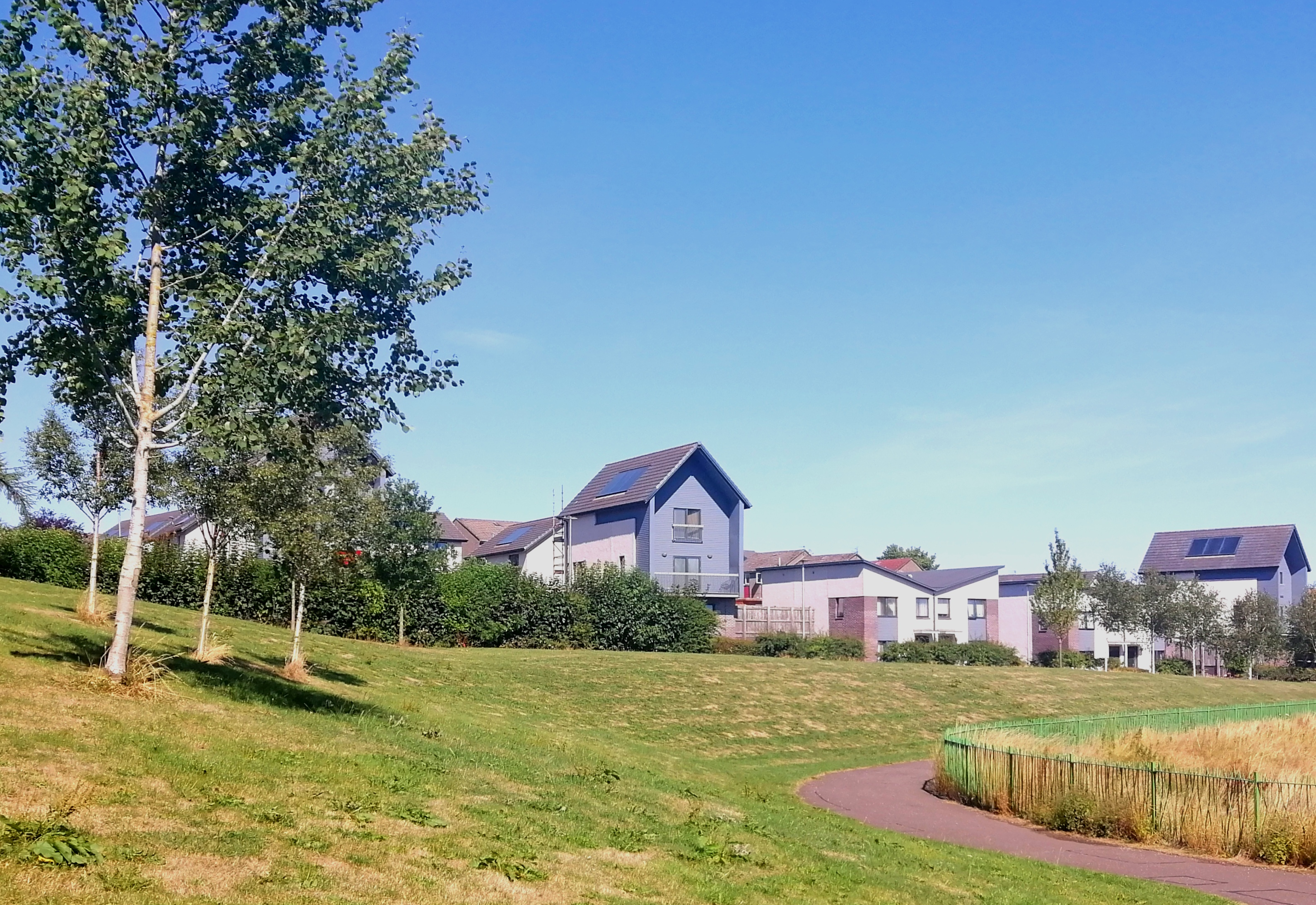

- Location within Dundee City council area Location within Scotland
- Council area: Dundee City
- Lieutenancy area: Dundee
- Country: Scotland
- Sovereign state: United Kingdom
- Post town: DUNDEE
- Postcode district: DD4
- Dialling code: 01382
- Police: Scotland
- Fire: Scottish
- Ambulance: Scottish
- UK Parliament: Dundee East
- Scottish Parliament: Dundee City East

Mill of Mains is a residential area located in the north of Dundee, Scotland.

== History ==
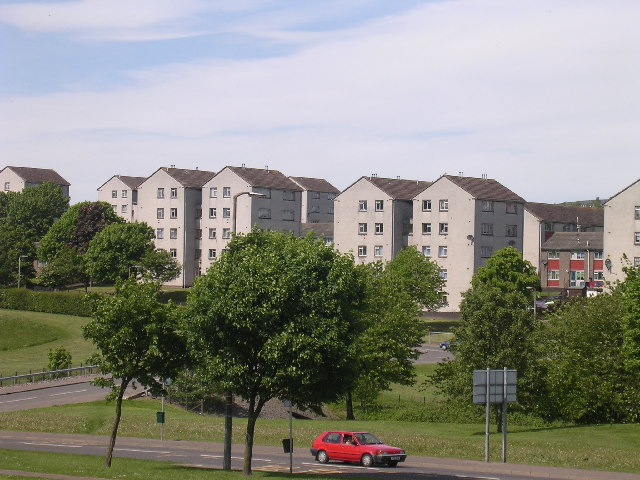
Mill of Mains in 2004.

The area of Mill of Mains began construction in the 1960s to accommodate Dundee's expanding population, similar to other areas in the north of Dundee. Tower blocks were built in the area alongside social housing. The local primary school, Mill of Mains Primary School opened in 1972 which also serves the areas of Claverhouse and Trottick.

During the 1990s and 2000s, the area of Mill of Mains started to become derelict and became a target of crime. A redevelopment of Mill of Mains began in the early 2010s with the block of flats being demolished and new housing being built. The work carried out by Home Group and the redevelopment of the area is ongoing.

Mill of Mains' local community pavilion which served the area alongside Claverhouse, was burnt down in 2017 and a campaign was launched to rebuild it. In 2021, the community pavilion was rebuilt next to the primary school.

In 2025, the charity Social Bite announced plans for a new recovery village to be built between Claverhouse Park and the Mill of Mains Play Area, aiming to help those with addiction issues. It has since faced criticism from residents for the location.

== Recreation ==
Mill of Mains has several recreational spaces that serve the local community.

The Mill of Mains Play Area is the primary outdoor space, offering a range of play equipment for children. It is located south of Claverhouse Park and functions as an extension of the larger green space, catering to both Mill of Mains and Claverhouse residents.

The nearby Claverhouse Park features a football pitch and is a popular spot for sports, dog walking, and outdoor activities. A gym and fitness area is situated between Claverhouse Park and Mill of Mains Play Area, providing additional exercise facilities for the community.

== Transport ==
Bus routes – Mill o' Mains
Bus route	Primary destinations	Bus stops near Mill o' Mains	Service provider
10	Ninewells Hospital; Broughty Ferry	Dundee, at Mill o' Mains; Foula Terrace	Xplore Dundee
33	City Centre; Whitfield	Dundee, at Mill o' Mains	Xplore Dundee
E1	Edinburgh; Perth; City Centre	Dundee, at Mill o' Mains	Ember
32	City Centre; Fintry	Findcastle Terrace (Fintry)	Xplore Dundee
21D	Forfar; City Centre	Foula Terrace	Stagecoach East Scotland

== Governance ==
Mill of Mains is in the North East ward of Dundee City Council, it is represented by Steven Rome and Willie Sawers of the Scottish National Party and Jax Finnegan of the Scottish Labour Party. The area is part of Dundee City West which is represented by Joe FitzPatrick in the Scottish Parliament, and in Dundee East which is represented by Stewart Hosie in the UK Parliament, both of which are Scottish National Party members.
