= Scottish School of Contemporary Dance =

Coordinates: 56.4847°N 2.9782°W

The Scottish School of Contemporary Dance is a dance and performing arts school affiliated with the Dundee College. The school offers a four-year training from foundation level. It prepares students for careers as dance performers, choreographers, and community artists. With approximately 100 students, the school is relatively small and maintains close links with a variety of professional artists, including Thomas Small.

== History ==
The school grew from an existing one year foundation course based at Dundee College, which was started in 1991 by Peter Royston. The second and third year of training were added in 1998 and 1999.

A successful bid to the National Lottery allowed the college to build a facility at its Kingsway campus, comprising dance studios and a theatre. Building began in 1999, and "The Space" was officially opened by Queen Elizabeth as part of the Golden Jubilee celebrations in 2002.

The College also successfully applied to the National Lottery for a Dance Artist from the Scottish Arts Council to develop a community programme which would use the facilities at non-training times. Market research was undertaken to determine the potential for a small touring venue.

== Activities ==
The school offers training to professional level focussing on technique in Graham, Cunningham and release techniques with a strong ballet development. The school seeks to nurture students choreographically and creatively and invites specialist lecturers such as Richard Alston, Stephen Petronio, and Sean Feldman.

Performances in the theatre have included those by the Scottish Ballet, the Scottish Dance Theatre, The X Factor, Stephen Petronio, and David Hughes.

== Academics ==
In September 2008 the school welcomed its first BA Hons degree students. This one year completion degree addition to the 3 or 4-year training is validated by Northumbria University and allows students to achieve levels of professional training previously only available in conservatoires in England.

== Patrons ==
Patrons of the school include:

- Brian Cox
- David Bellamy
- Stephen Petronio.
