= Dighty Burn =

River in Scotland

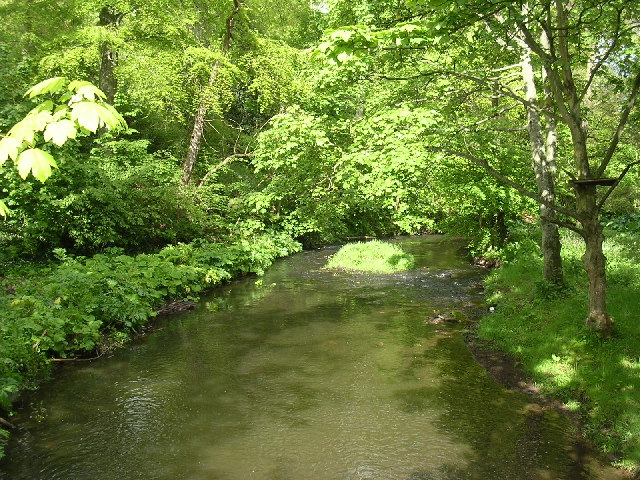
- The Dighty Burn at Claverhouse

Physical characteristics
- Source
  - location: Sidlaw Hills
- Mouth: Firth of Tay
  - coordinates: 56°28′30″N 2°50′12″W
- Length: 20 km (12 mi)

The Dighty Burn, also known as Dighty Water or Dichty Water, is a burn or stream 20 kilometres (12 mi) in length that flows through the north and east of Dundee, Scotland.

== Course ==
The burn forms to the west of Dundee as the Lundie Burn in the Sidlaw Hills then runs north of Piperdam and then into the northwest of Dundee through Bridgefoot, Trottick, Claverhouse, Mill o' Mains, Fintry, Douglas, Claypotts, under the Seven Arches Viaduct, and then between Broughty Ferry and Monifeith where it flows into the Firth of Tay, near Balmossie railway station.

== History ==
The water from the Dighty Burn was used as a power source for the mill buildings at the Claverhouse Bleachworks factory.

In the past, the Dighty Water was used to power water wheels and cloth was bleached on its banks. Trout and a few salmon are found in the burn. Several hundred Mesolithic tools of flint were found on the banks of Dighty Water, approximately where the burn passes under the A92.

In 2013, Dighty Connect was formed, a group aiming to enhance green spaces situated around the burn through a mixture of conservation and cultural activities.

== Wildlife ==
There is much plant and animal life throughout the Dighty Burn. Giant hogweed is commonly found as well as seagulls, swans, swallows and heron, as well as roe deer can be found at the Trottick Ponds nature reserve, which the Dighty Burn runs past.

== Gallery ==
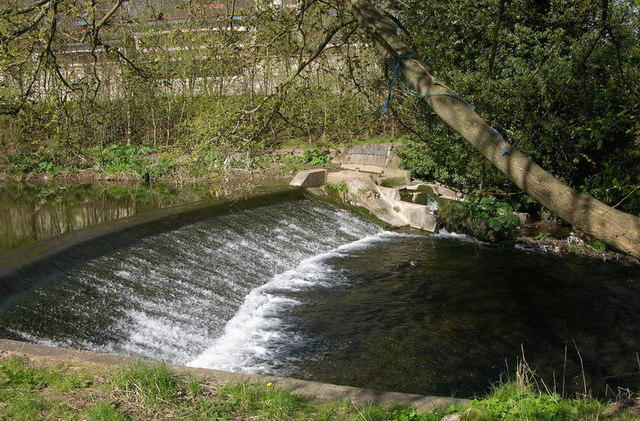

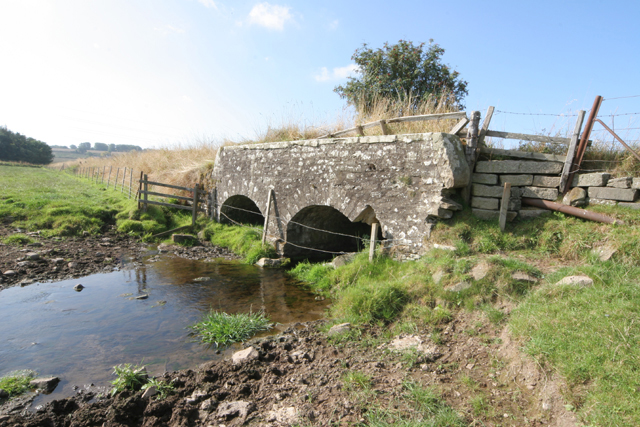

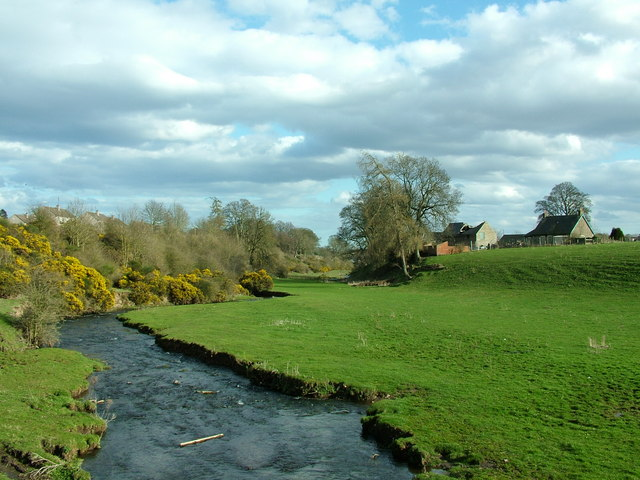

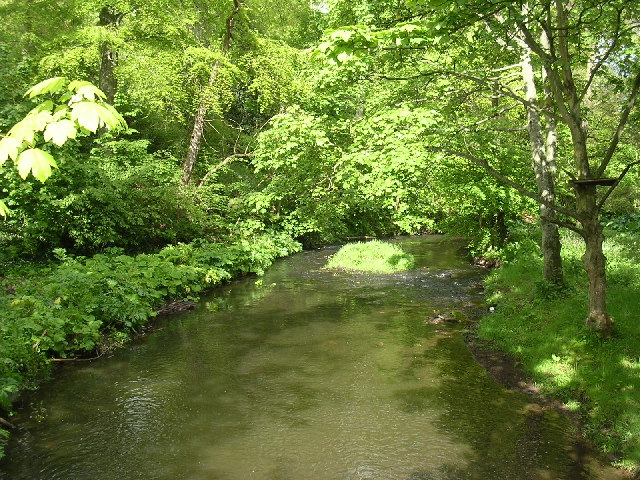

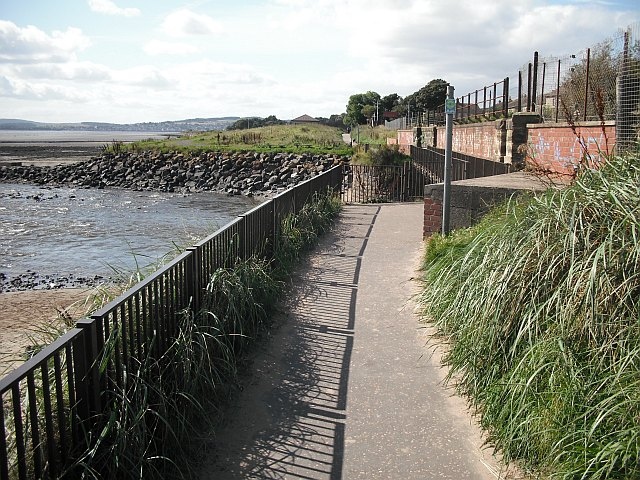
