= Trottick Mill Ponds =

Nature Reserve in Dundee, Scotland

Trottick Mill Ponds and Nature Reserve
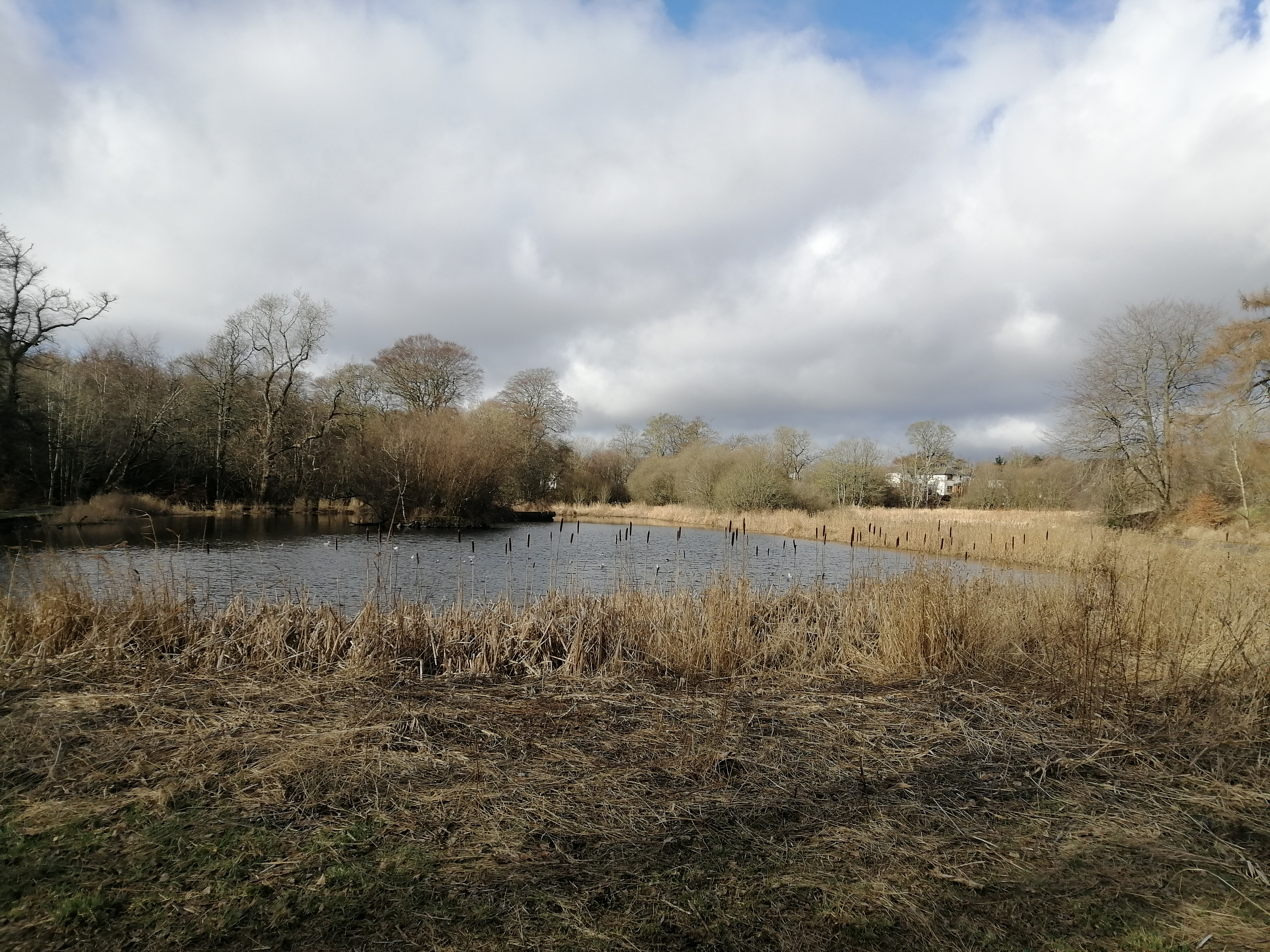
- Trottick Mill Ponds in March 2021
- Interactive map of Trottick Mill Ponds and Nature Reserve
- Location: Dundee, Scotland
- Coordinates: 56.49171°N 2.9672027°W
- Designation: Local nature reserve
- Established: 1800s
- Owner: Dundee City Council
- Website: Trottick Mill Ponds Local Nature Reserve

Trottick Mill Ponds and Nature Reserve is a local nature reserve located in the Trottick area in Dundee, Scotland. The nature reserve connects with the Dighty Burn and is voluntarily operated by Countryside Rangers as well as the Scottish Wildlife Trust and owned by Dundee City Council.

== History ==
Trottick Mill Ponds was originally created to be used as a water source for the nearby Claverhouse Bleachworks factory which was used for the cleaning and drying processes for the linen production in Dundee back in the late 19th and early 20th centuries.

Sluice gates were installed to control the flow of water at the reserve and the use of a water wheel allowed water from the Dighty Burn to be pushed through into the reserve.

The nature reserve is now popular among local residents and visitors to Dundee and is also used for educational purposes as well.

Trottick Ponds is a part of the Green Circular cycle route in Dundee, to which it received an extensive upgrade in 2016 and its feature as part of the Green Circular route contributed to it being featured by Herald Scotland as one of the top ten cycle routes in Scotland in 2020.

Trottick Ponds is also a location on the Claverhouse Equestrian route.

== Wildlife ==
There are different types of wildlife found at Trottick Mill Ponds, most prominently, two resident mute swans. There are also many birds and ducks which inhabit the reserve area such as great tits, blue tits, European robins and seagulls. There is also various frogs and toads which inhabit the area as well. Roe deer can also be spotted at the northern side of the reserve.

== Maintenance ==
Trottick Mill Ponds is maintained mainly by the Countryside Rangers who volunteer at the reserve. The sluice gates that were constructed at the reserve continue to be in use for the purpose of maintaining circulation of the water in the ponds.

== Gallery ==
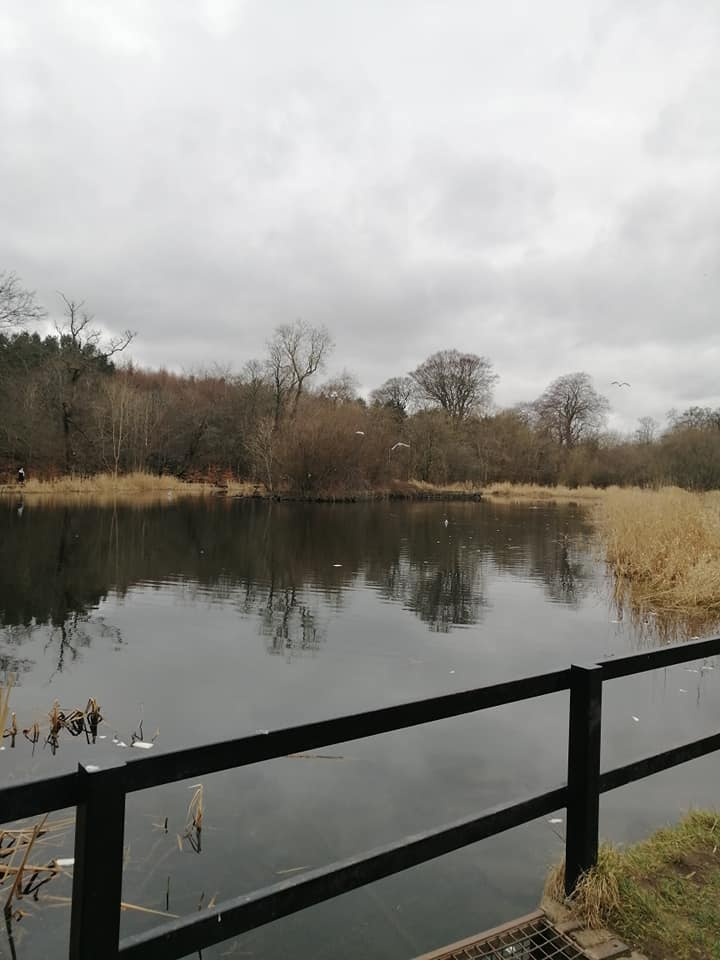

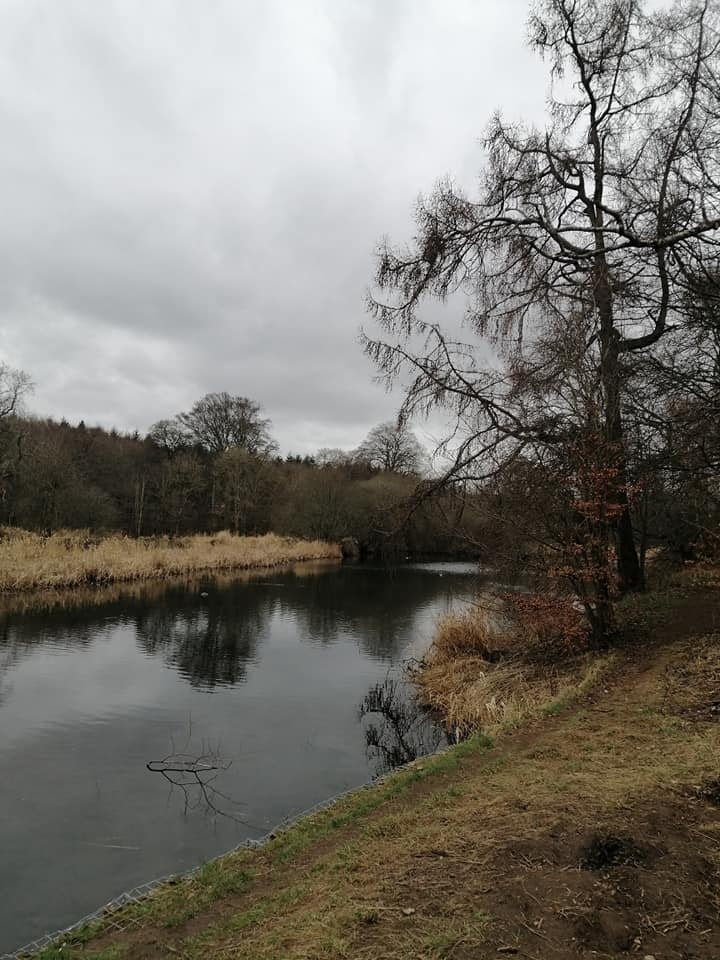

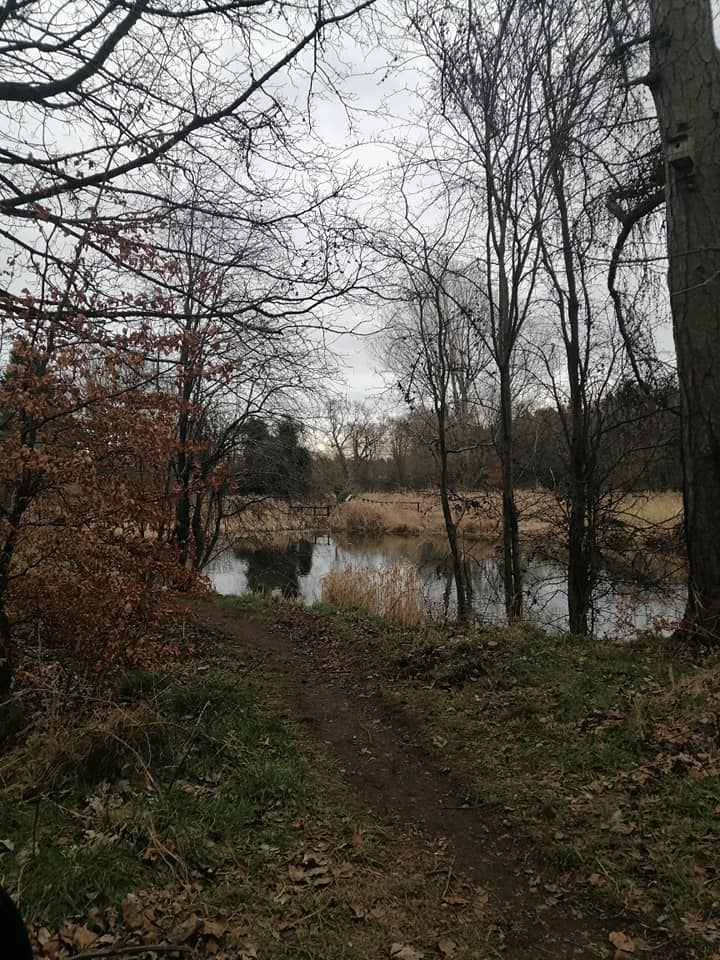

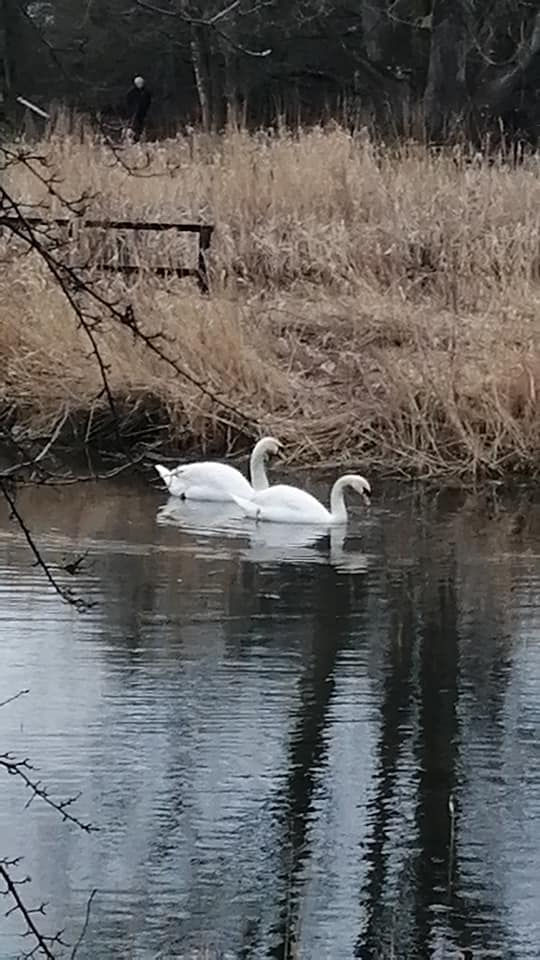
Swans at Trottick Ponds

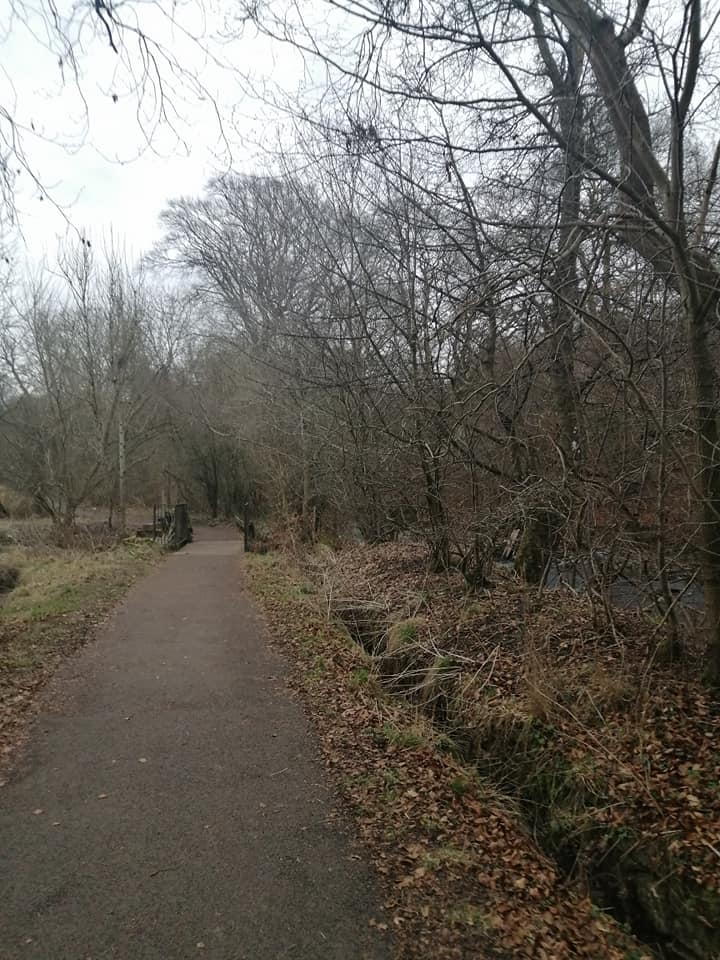
