= Seven Arches Viaduct =

Former railway viaduct in Angus

The Seven Arches Viaduct or Balmossie Viaduct is a former railway bridge in Monifieth, Scotland listed by Historic Environment Scotland as a Category A listed structure. The bridge stands 75 m (246 ft) above the Dighty Burn which it carried trains over, and is made of seven brick arches which act as its namesake. It has since been converted into a public footbridge.

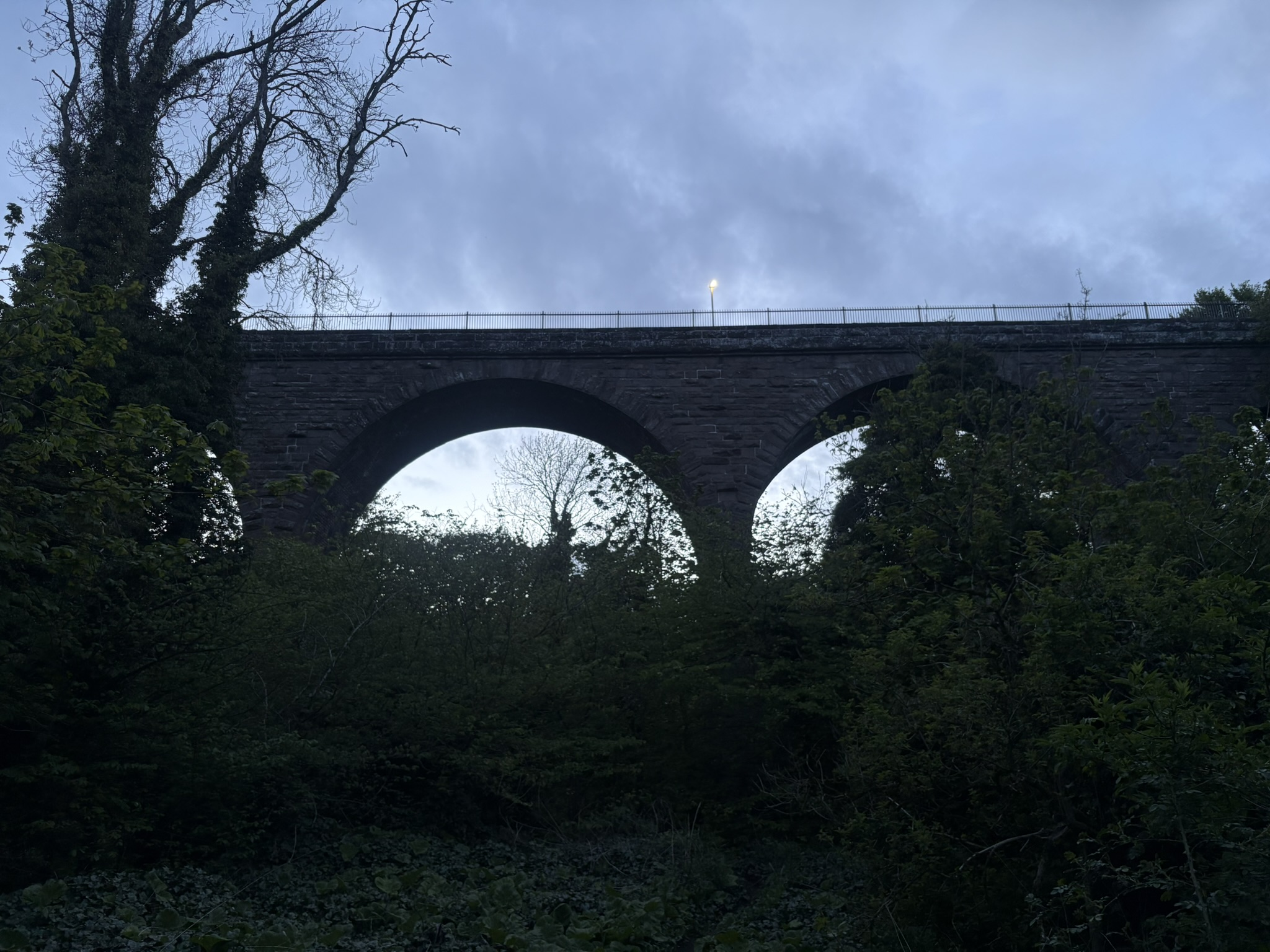
Seven Arches Viaduct, Monifieth, photographed in the evening

== History ==
The Seven Arches Viaduct was built in 1870 to carry trains moving across the Dundee and Forfar Direct Line. The viaduct was opened by the Caledonian Railway corporation and engineered by George MacKay and John Willet. The viaduct was constructed to carry passengers over the Dighty water, which after crossing, saw the railway curve up towards the now disused and removed railway station of Kingennie. The viaduct was first used on the 12th of August 1870 to transport goods, such as those manufactured at the nearby Panmurefield Bleachworks, distributed from the local (disused) railway station at Barnhill, Dundee or in the City of Dundee to be transported across Tayside, before Board of Trade Inspector Captain Kyle advised that the viaduct would be an effective carrier of passengers. The railway line allowed easier connections between the county town of Angus Council and the industrialised City of Dundee. As well as this, the viaduct was used to connect the local hamlets on the modern B978 and B9128 which lead to Forfar.

In 1893 a heatwave challenged the engineering of the tracks, resulting in them to be warped into something approaching a 'half circle' forcing the train driver to carry out an emergency stop, which caused passengers inside the train to fall and crash into each other, but thankfully prevented the train from derailing, and subsequently going over the bridge onto and down an embankment.

As World War II saw a significant interruption to daily lives on citizens which lived by the railway, as Dundonian children were evacuated, many men had signed up to or were conscripted to fight on the Western Front (World War II), and there was no significant military bases on the line which supplies would need to be transported between, the Dundee to Forfar line saw a decrease in its use by passengers and supply trains, which was noted by the Caledonian Railway Co. in 1945, after the wars conclusion, resulting in the final passenger train travelling on the viaduct in 1955. However, good services continued infrequently until 1967, by which point the Seven Arches Viaduct became disused, and the entire Dundee to Forfar line had ceased service permanently.

After the closure of the line, the viaduct's rail tracks, like the stones which made up the structures of historic fortresses around Monifieth, was likely raided by civilians in order to expand the town. However, some remnants of the tracks do remain in existence.

== Modern use ==
After its closure in 1967, the viaduct was eventually sold to Dundee City Council for £1, and was repurposed into a public walkway connecting Barnhill to Monifieth. The viaduct is part of a scenic walkpath around the Dighty Burn, and runs above the Green Circular route, which can be accessed by a stairwell which connects the viaduct and burnside path below.

In 1985 the viaduct was listed by Historic Environment Scotland as a Category A listed structure, designating it as one of national or international historic importance, placing it alongside around 7% of all listed buildings in Scotland. This guarantees the protection on the viaduct from demolition or significant alteration and signifies its unaltered design since its erection in 1870.

The Seven Arches Viaduct is part of the border between Angus Council and Dundee, resulting in disputes over which council is now responsible for it, following the acquisition of Monifieth by Angus in 1996. The bridge's bins are currently attended to primarily by Dundee City Council, but sees involvement from both in keeping the walkway clean for users.
