= Peter Royston (choreographer) =

Peter Royston (born 1952 in London) is an English dancer, choreographer, teacher and director.

== Early life ==
He is a Royal Academy of Dancing scholar (1963–1968) and trained at The Royal Ballet School (1968–1970) Arts Educational (1970–1971)

== Career ==
He danced in the Royal Ballet of Flanders, Munster State Ballet, Kiel State Ballet, and the Scottish Ballet (1975–1985).

He choreographed major works for The Scottish Ballet: Steps to ? (1981), To The Last Whale (1982), Randombach, Quarrels not their own (1983), Pococurantis (1985), Ringed by the flat horizon (1985). For Scottish Dance Theatre: Friction and Touch (both with Graham Bowers, 1985), Brief Encounter (1986), Love minus zero no limit (1986), 5 Women (1986) and Consuming Passions (1987)

Other choreography: Red Hot Shoes for Tron Theatre (writer Liz Lochhead 1987), Columba (opera to celebrate the 250th anniversary of Glasgow Cathedral 1987), Great Scot (director John Cairney 1988).

He was on the dance committee at the Scottish Arts Council 1994 - 1999. He was appointed lecturer at Dundee College in 1991. He developed a foundation course for the Scottish School of Contemporary Dance.

He was appointed dance artist in residence to the Scottish Borders Region (1988–1991); he created the Borders Dance Festival and works including a site-specific work with composer Savourna Stevenson.
