= Dundee city centre =

Area of Dundee, Scotland

Coordinates: 56.458339°N 2.971933°W

City Centre, Dundee
- Location within Dundee City council area Location within Scotland
- OS grid reference: NO402300
- Council area: Dundee City
- Lieutenancy area: Dundee
- Country: Scotland
- Sovereign state: United Kingdom
- Post town: DUNDEE
- Postcode district: DD1
- Dialling code: 01382
- Police: Scotland
- Fire: Scottish
- Ambulance: Scottish
- UK Parliament: Dundee East Dundee West
- Scottish Parliament: Dundee City East Dundee City West

Until the Industrial Revolution, the current City Centre represented the full extent of the City of Dundee, Scotland. Now roughly encircled by the A991 dual carriageway (incorporating the Marketgait), the city centre is now the main shopping and commercial district. Unlike the city centre of Glasgow, many of the city centre's streets (especially in the southern and eastern quarters) are not built on a grid plan and in that way have more in common with the street plan of the Old Town of Edinburgh (although most buildings in Dundee's city centre date from the 19th century or later).

== Areas ==
The modern city centre is still divided into the seven medieval thoroughfares: the Seagait, Murraygait, Marketgait (now High Street), Nethergait, Overgait, Wellgait and the Cowgait - “Gait” being a Scots word for street.

However all are now referred to with the "gait" being replaced with "gate". The "Overgate" and "Wellgate" have become enclosed shopping centres.)

Many of the medieval closes were demolished in the late 19th century to make way for larger and grander Victorian streets. However, the area to the north of the city centre between Meadowside, Ward Road, and the Marketgait is mostly based on a grid system with wide avenues and crescents, due to much of this area being planned and designed in the Victorian era.

== Cityscape ==
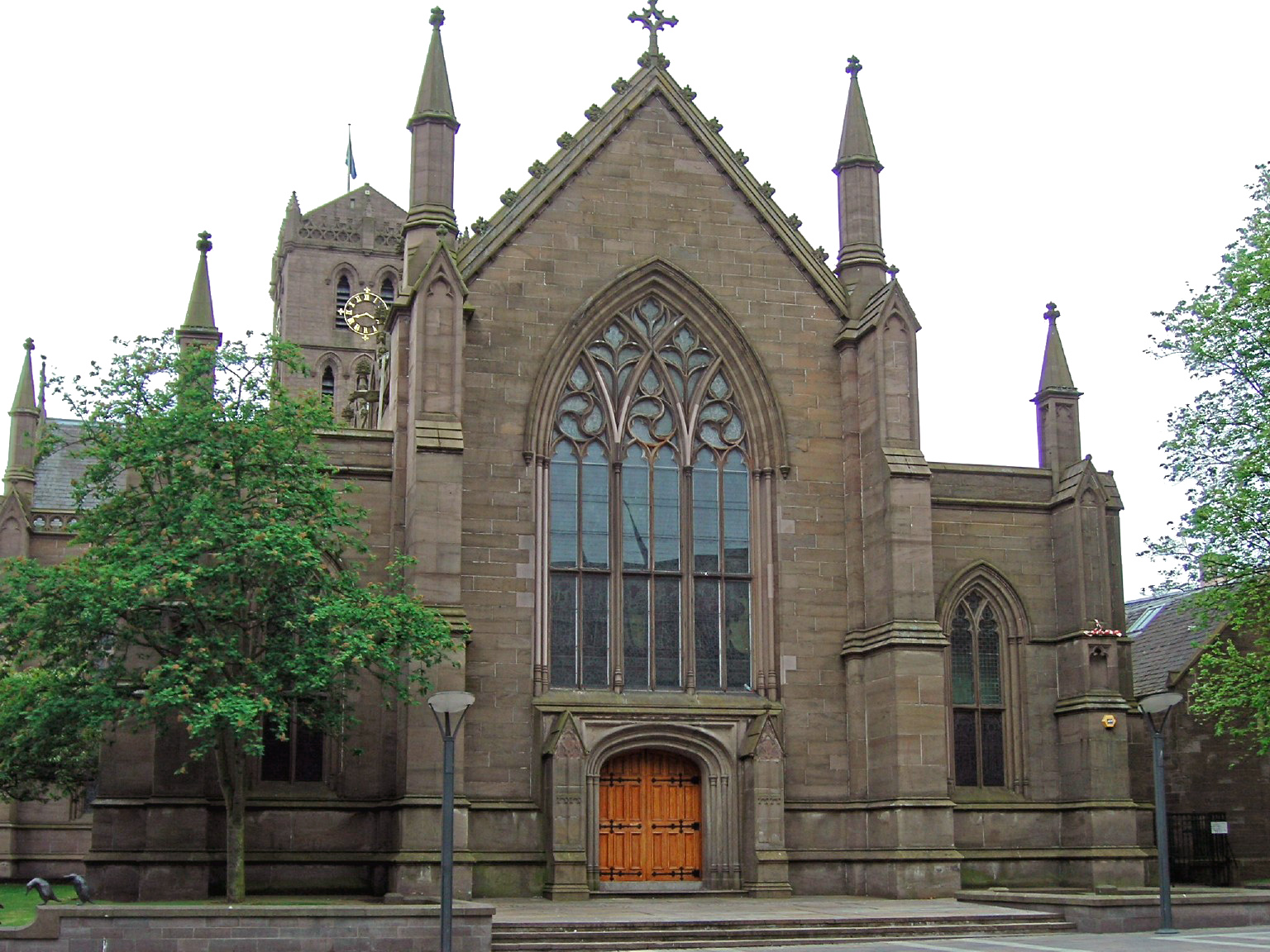
Dundee Parish Church, St Mary's is one of two of the city's City Churches

At the heart of the city centre is the City Square, home to two of Dundee's principal cultural venues; the Caird Hall, the Marryat Hall along with the City Chambers and other businesses. The multi-storey Tayside House, completed in 1976 to accommodate the then new Tayside Regional Council, and latterly the main headquarters of Dundee City Council, was located directly behind the City Square. It was demolished in 2013 as part of the redevelopment of the waterfront area, with the council HQ moving to Dundee House.

== Offices ==
The offices of D. C. Thomson & Co. Ltd, Alliance Trust, the McManus Galleries, the High School of Dundee, University of Abertay Dundee the Barrack Street Natural History Museum, the Episcopal St Paul's Cathedral, Dundee Central Library, Dundee's main railway station and the headquarters of Tayside Police are all to be found in the city centre.

There is also a ten-story office building called City House located in the Overgate.

== Statues ==
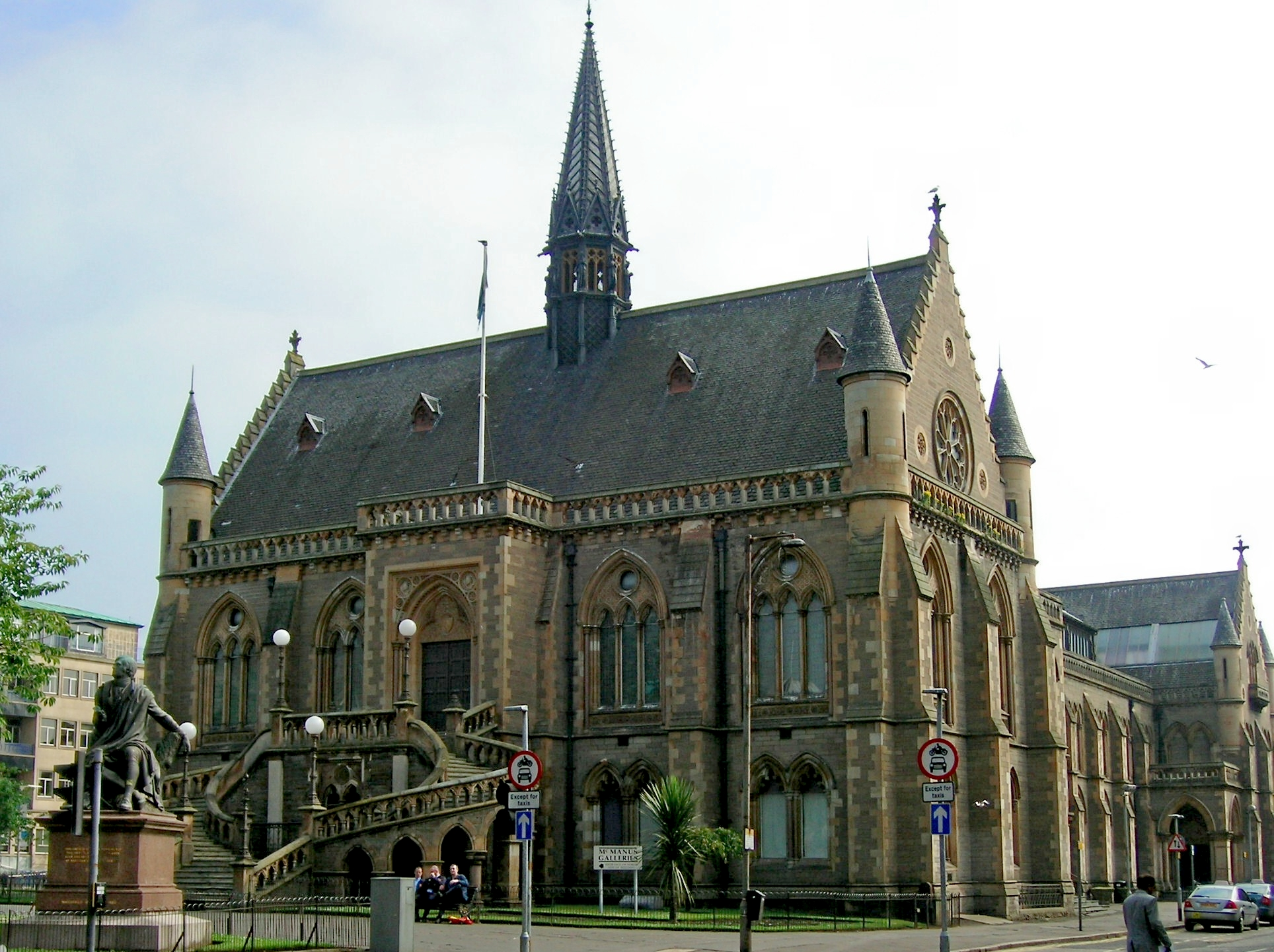
McManus Galleries houses a museum and art gallery with a collection of fine and decorative art as well as a natural history collection

Many of Dundee's public statues are scattered throughout the neighbourhood, subjects include Robert Burns, Queen Victoria, Admiral Duncan, the Strathmartine Dragon, James Carmichael, Desperate Dan and Minnie the Minx, there is also a plaque to William Wallace, on the supposed site where he began his war for independence by murdering the son of the English governor, sheriff or magistrate of Dundee after he had made a constant habit of bullying him and his family. Although this local folk tale may or may not be true, it is known that that St Paul's Cathedral, where the plaque is located is the site of Dundee's old castle, which the army of Wallace and Andrew Moray laid siege to early in the Wars of Scottish Independence.

== Developments ==
In 2000, a major public consultation into the future of the waterfront was conducted to coincide with the partial redevelopment of the Seabraes area (including the new Science Centre). A masterplan was developed, with infrastructure work being undertaken (including strengthening of the railway tunnel) in 2006. In 2009, one of the major elements of the redevelopment was undertaken: the realignment of the A92 Tay Road Bridge offramps. The opening of a new museum and gallery - V&A Dundee - was announced in 2010. Removal of several key structures including Tayside House, the Hilton Hotel and Casino, the 1970s entrance buildings to the railway station, the Olympia Leisure Centre (relocated to East Marketgait) along with associated pedestrian over-bridges, was completed in 2013. The project, as a whole, was expected to be completed by 2017.

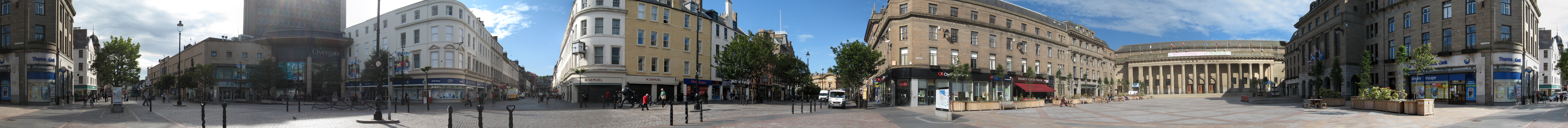
360° view of Dundee City Centre seen from the High Street
