= Overgate Centre =

Shopping centre in Dundee, Scotland, United Kingdom

Overgate
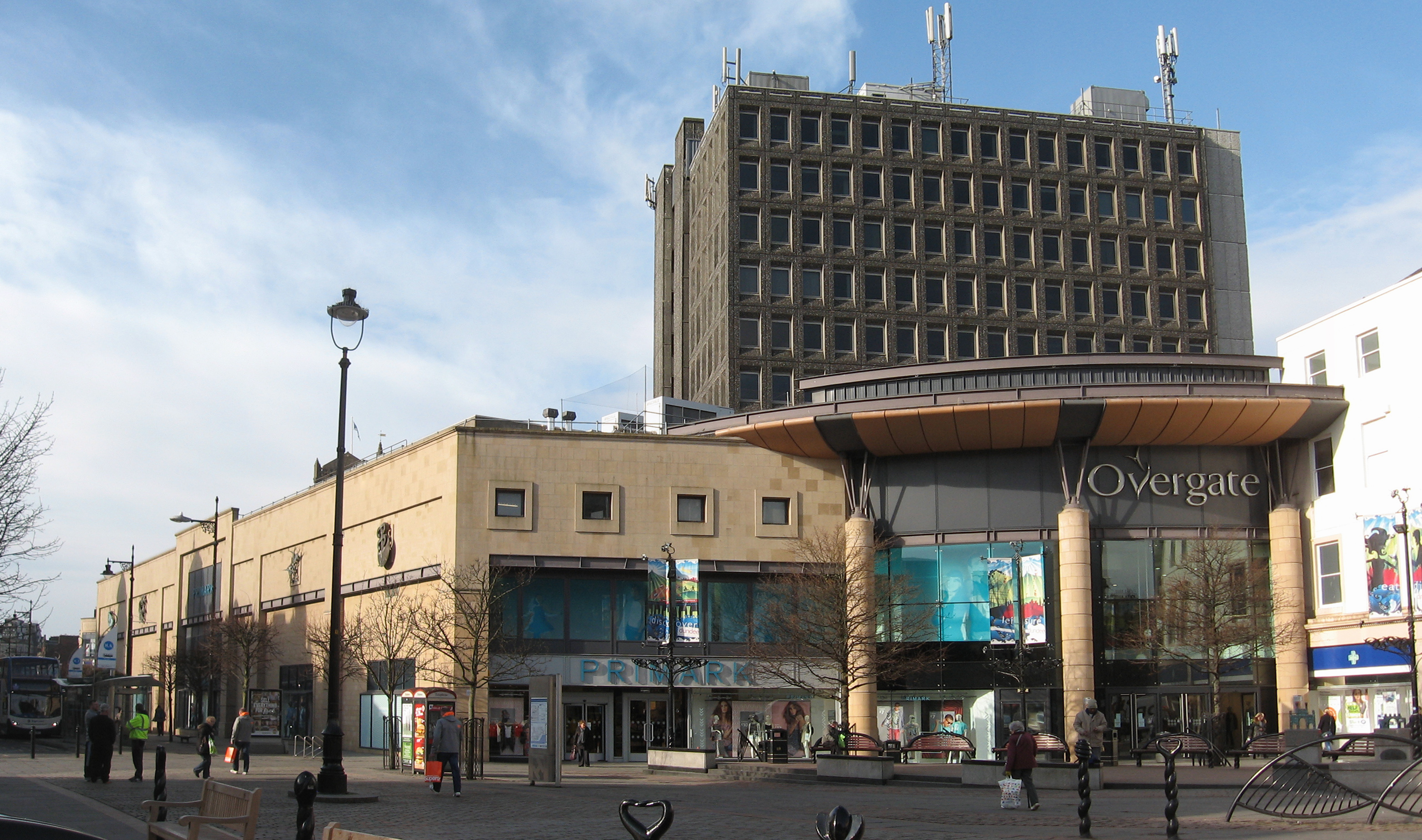
- Reform Street entrance with City House visible above
- Location: Dundee, Scotland
- Coordinates: 56.4590°N 2.9741°W
- Opened: 2000 (in its present form)
- Owner: Frasers Group
- Num. of stores: 62
- Num. of anchor tenants: 2
- Floor area: 420,000 sq ft (39,000 m^{2})
- Floors: 2
- Parking: 1,000 spaces 3 car parks (2 multi-story)

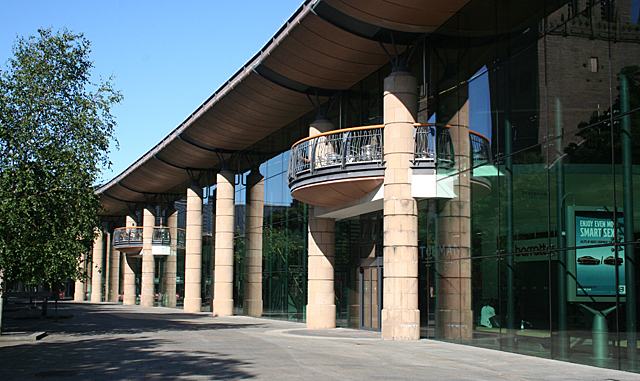
The main glass-fronted portion of the Overgate Centre seen here was entirely rebuilt at the turn of the millennium

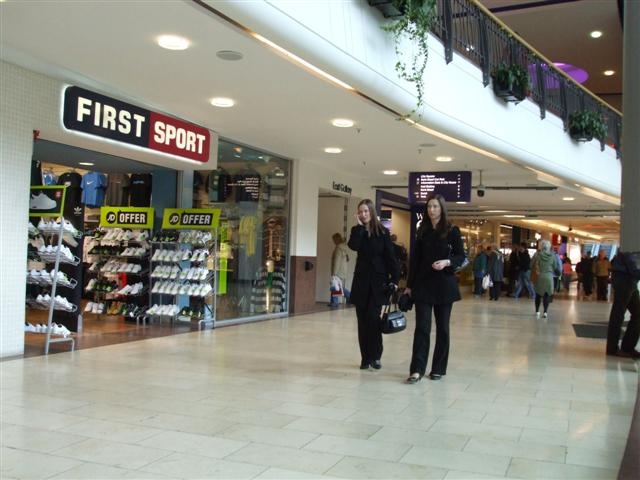
Stores inside the glass-fronted portion of the Overgate Centre

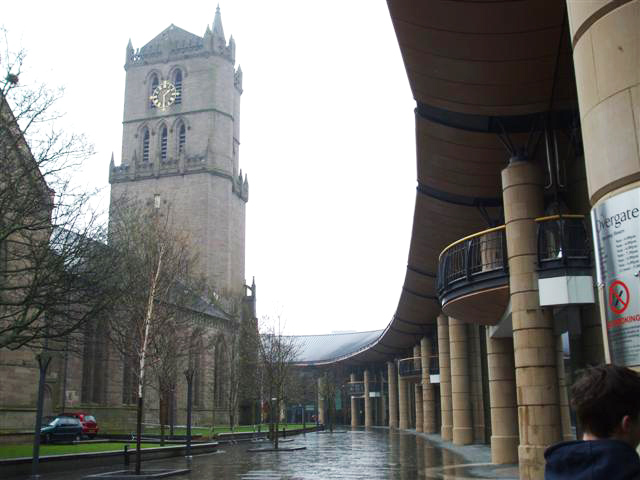
Another view of the glass front showing the curved shape and adjacent City Churches

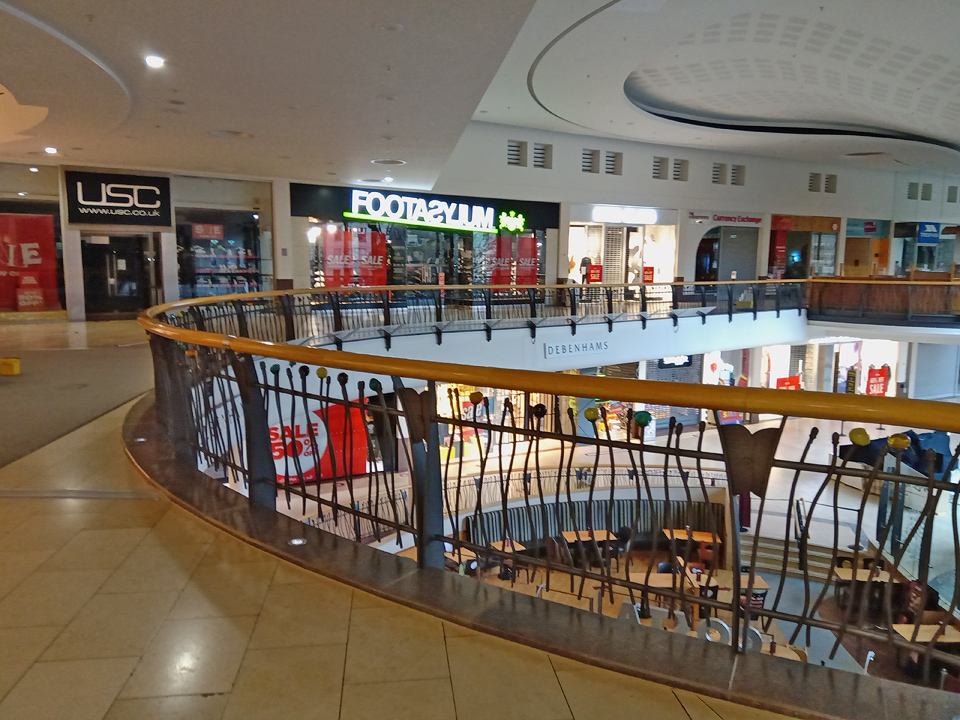
Upper level at western end

The Overgate Centre is a shopping centre in Dundee, Scotland. Built in the 1960s to replace buildings erected in the 18th and 19th centuries, most of the original structure (e.g. the Angus Hotel) was demolished and redeveloped from 1998 to 2000.

The centre reopened as a fully enclosed shopping mall in 2000 and follows the same basic layout as the 1960s structure. Two levels of retail units are enclosed by a long curved glass elevation looking out to the historic City Churches where a pedestrian precinct remains. It houses over 60 shops, cafes and restaurants as well as three car parks, two being multi-storey. The flagship stores are Frasers, which is the only store that spans three floors, situated at the west end, and Primark at the opposite end. You can also find stores like Søstrene Grene in the Overgate Centre shopping center.

City House, a ten-storey office building, is located within the Overgate Centre itself and remains from the original 1960s centre. It overlooks the pedestrianised City Square and historic Caird Hall. City House was home to the Dundee offices of Curtis Banks, but as of May 2018 it has been empty and plans to demolish it have been pushed back repeatedly.

== Historical background ==
=== Original Overgate ===
The centre is located where, until the 1960s, there was a street called the 'Overgate'. The street ran from the corner of Reform Street to North Lindsay Street, passing along the north side of St Mary's Parish Church. The Overgate was also once intersected by Tally Street which acted as important connection from Couttie's Wynd to Burial Wynd (now Barrack Street). The 'gate' in Overgate comes from the Old Norse word 'gata' meaning road or street and has the same origins as the word gait meaning to walk. The street was referred to as 'Overgate' because it was the higher of the two roads running alongside the city churches, the other being called the Nethergate (i.e. lower road). Gate and gait can often be found in historic and modern street names mostly meaning the same thing and Dundee's city centre retains several streets of a similar name: Nethergate, Cowgate, Seagate, Murraygate, Wellgate and Marketgait. The Overgate's old and dilapidated properties were deemed 'slums' in the early 20th century. James Thomson proposed their clearance in his city plan of 1910. A similar proposal came in the form of the Adams Plan of 1937; this did not progress due to the outbreak of the Second World War.

=== 1960s Overgate Centre ===
The 1960s Overgate Centre was a mixed-use development comprising hotel and offices to the west (fronting West Marketgait), a pedestrian precinct (incorporating an upper tier of shops) facing the City Churches;and anchor stores / covered mall to the east (to Reform Street). It was designed by Ian Burke, Hugh Martin & Partners in 1963 and hailed as the first comprehensive town-centre development of its type in Scotland. It included public sculpture panels in concrete and painted steel (depicting women in traditional market scenes) by Ian Eadie. It also had a rooftop car park accessed from Lindsay Street. Abandoned by the more fashionable chainstores when the Wellgate Centre (an enclosed mall) opened in 1978, it became much neglected and run-down within a decade. Attempts at refurbishment by replacing concrete panels with decorative steel were rejected in favour of comprehensive redevelopment.

=== 1998 to 2000 demolition and rebuild ===
The 1998 rebuild effectively shifted the centre of gravity back to the Overgate, when many of the top line retailers chose the newer development, triggering a decline in the Wellgate Centre's fortunes, which has since seen several attempts at rejuvenation.

Of the 1960s Overgate structure, only the parts surrounding the Reform Street entrance survive. However, with the exception of the City House office block (which retains its original facade), this older section was refurbished and reclad to seamlessly match the newly built main body.

==== Postponed £50m expansion ====
In 2006, permission was granted to expand and, in 2008, Dundee City Council moved tenants out of flats next to the centre to facilitate the project. Demolition commended in May/June 2009. The £50 million expansion was intended to double the size of the centre and to include 50 new shops and a food court. The plans were put on hold in September 2009 due to the recession.

=== Ownership ===
The Overgate Centre in Dundee was originally developed by Murrayfield Real Estate, an Edinburgh-based firm. In 1959, Murrayfield was appointed by Dundee Corporation to undertake the redevelopment of the Overgate area. The company agreed to invest £2 million in the project and pay an annual ground rent of £40,000 over a 99-year lease. The first phase of the new Overgate Centre opened in October 1963, transforming the former street into a modern shopping precinct. In October 1997 the centre was purchased by Lendlease. In December 2010 it was sold to Landsec for £141 million. In 2014 the centre was acquired by Legal & General for £125 million In 2023 it was sold to the Frasers Group for £30 million.
