= Wellgate Centre =

Wellgate Shopping Centre

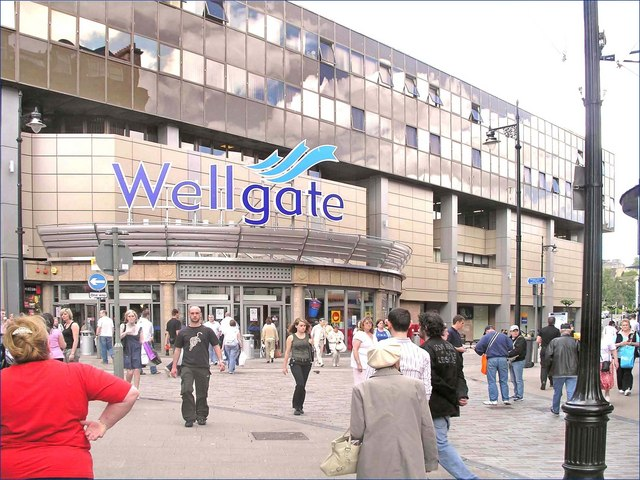
- The Wellgate Centre in 2007
- Location: Dundee, Scotland
- Coordinates: 56.4643°N 2.9694°W
- Opened: 4 April 1978
- Num. of stores: 40
- Num. of anchor tenants: 1
- Floors: 3
- Parking: Multi-storey
- Website: Wellgate Shopping Centre

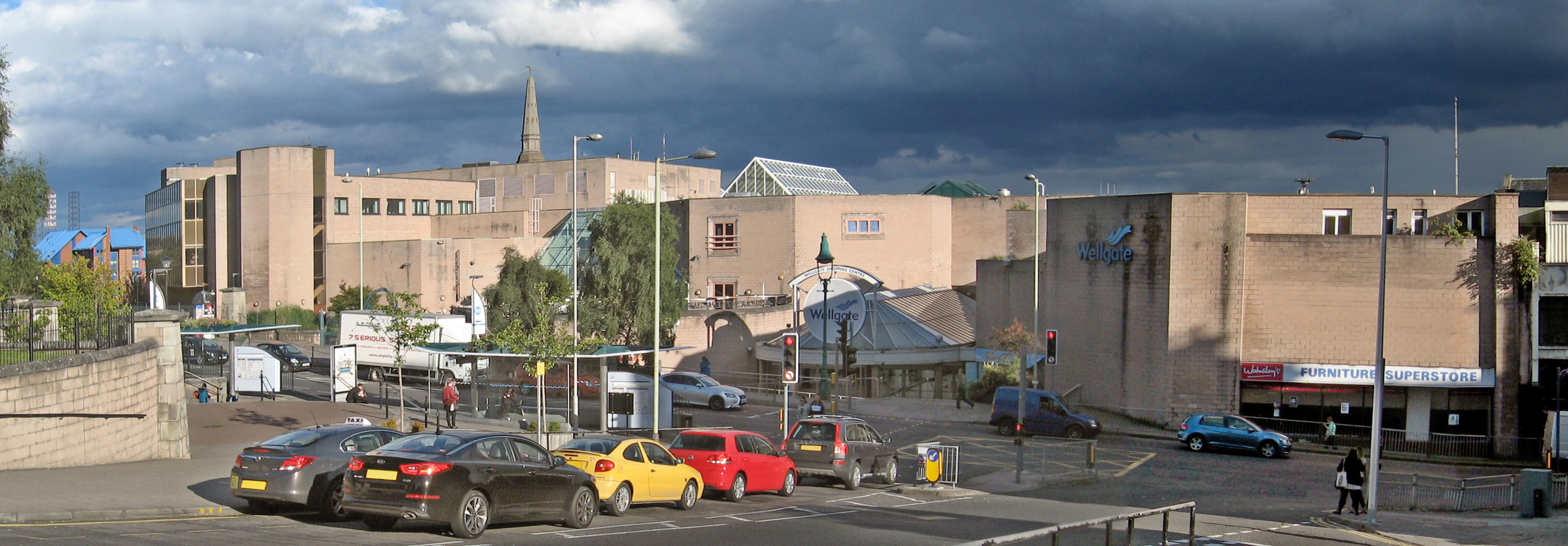
Victoria Road entrance of Wellgate Centre and Central Library (left) in 2015.

The Wellgate Shopping Centre is one of the two main shopping centres located in the city centre of Dundee, Scotland, the other being the Overgate Centre.

It comprises two shopping floors and a third floor containing a food court, JD Gyms and Dundee Central Library. The centre has a variety of discount retailers, with, Home Bargains and B&M Bargains operating the largest stores within the centre. Other high-street retailers include Poundland, Savers, and Iceland. Prior to its collapse, British Home Stores operated a two-level anchor-store at the entrance of the centre, which was occupied by TJ Hughes.

From its early years until the reopening of the largely-rebuilt Overgate Centre in 2000, the Wellgate was Dundee's principal shopping mall.

== History ==
=== Original Wellgate ===
The original Wellgate was a thoroughfare that was located between the Hilltown and the Murraygate.

The 'gate' in Wellgate comes from the Old Norse word 'gata' meaning road or street and has the same origins as the word gait meaning 'to walk'. The street was referred to as 'Wellgate' because it led to a well at the foot of the Hilltown. Gate and gait can often be found in historic and modern street names, normally meaning the same thing and along with the Wellgate, Dundee's compact city centre retains several streets with this characteristic: Cowgate, Marketgait, Murraygate, Nethergate, Overgate and Seagate.

The old Wellgate featured a variety of shops and restaurants which all later closed to make way for the new centre.

In 2023, Leisure and Culture Dundee launched The Wellgate Project which was created to preserve the history and story of the street.

=== Construction and opening ===
The Wellgate Centre began construction in 1974 and later opened on 4 April 1978. The ornate green lamp post that was situated on top of the Wellgate Steps was retained when the centre was opened. The Wellgate Steps themself however were demolished and replaced with much wider steps.

The centre's opening was met with success as it was the first major indoor shopping centre in Dundee. It became popular with shoppers in Dundee and was the preferred shopping location for Dundonians over the 1960s open-air Overgate and continued to be the case until the demolition and reconstruction of the Overgate in 2000.

The centre was home to the largest Tesco store in Scotland and its opening day had a record number of visitors of any of their stores in the country.

The Wellgate Clock and the Wellgate Fountain were two additions to the centre when it opened in 1978 and became popular among locals and visitors to the centre.

=== 1970s-2020s ===
In 1979, a year after opening, the Wellgate became the location of a bomb scare that resulted in the centre being evacuated.

The centre was visited by Doctor Who actor Tom Baker and Coronation Street actor William Roache in November and December 1979 respectively.

The Wellgate Market Hall opened in the centre in the 1980s and was popular among shoppers up until its closure in April 1999.

In July 2013, it was reported that the owners planned to refurbish the centre, including construction of a 900-seat cinema. In March 2014, the BBC reported that an operator had been found for the proposed cinema, and that development work at the site was expected to take place later that year, taking 12 to 18 months to complete. However, the plan had been put on hold.

The plan had been brought back in discussion in August 2018 as a new poll was conducted by Dundee City Council for the Evening Telegraph, Dundee's local paper which showed that a strong majority of people wanted to see the Wellgate redeveloped in the near future.

In 2022, the Wellgate was purchased for £1.2 million by Belgate Estates however the sale fell through and didn’t go ahead.

== Future ==
In November 2022, Dundee City Council revealed plans to redevelop the inner city centre with the Wellgate included in the plans. Such proposals included redeveloping and repurposing the shopping centre as a leisure hub.

Other plans included partially or fully demolishing the shopping centre where the Wellgate would once again be pedestrianised and returned to a throughfare similar to what the Wellgate was before the opening of the centre in 1978.

=== Dundee and Angus College planned takeover ===
In November 2024, Dundee and Angus College confirmed plans to repurpose the Wellgate into a new college campus as part of a ten year plan for the college which would see the closure of the Kingsway campus.

As part of the development, the Wellgate Clock would be reinstated on the ground floor with the college classes on the upper levels.

== Features ==
The Wellgate is notable for being home to an automated clock, the Wellgate Clock, which is located on the second floor next to the Central Library and has been in operation since it was installed in the centre in September 1978, months after the centre opened.

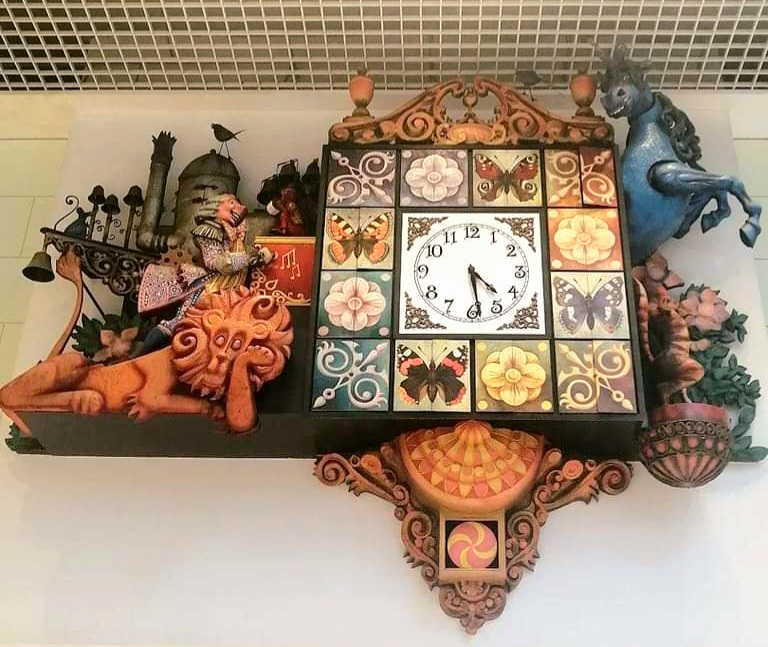
The Wellgate Clock pictured in 2023 on the second floor of the centre

The clock was manufactured by Haward Horological Ltd. The clock has been a meeting point for couples and families and watching the clock was considered a magnet to Dundonian life on Saturday's in the city and is popular among locals and visitors to the centre.

One prominent feature of the Wellgate which dates back before the centre is the Wellgate Steps which previously led down to the thoroughfare and now leads down into the second floor of the shopping centre. They were partially destroyed in 1977 during the construction of the centre.

The shopping centre featured a water fountain which was located on the ground floor, this has since been removed.

Moby, a whale sculpture made out of recyclable materials, was erected on the second floor in November 2022.
