= Overgate Hospice =

Hospice and charitable organisation

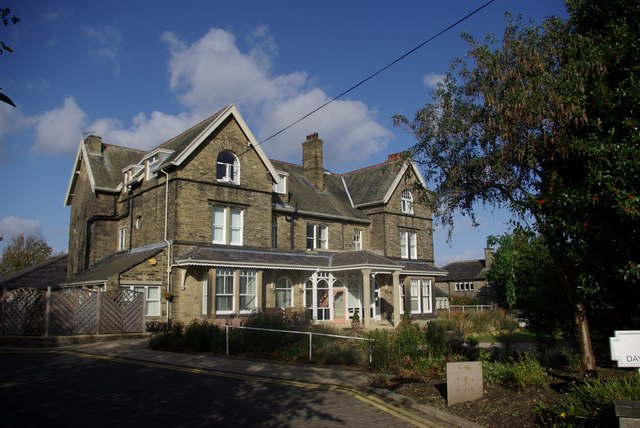
- Overgate Hospice
- Predecessor: Charity for nursing home or homes Calderdale Society for Continuing Care
- Formation: 3 June 1979
- Founder: Dr Brian Quinn, Sylvia Graucob
- Type: Hospice; Charitable organisation
- Registration no.: "Overgate Hospice, registered charity no. 511619". Charity Commission for England and Wales.
- Legal status: Charitable company
- Purpose: To provide specialist palliative care services to the adult population of Calderdale
- Location: Elland, West Yorkshire, England
- Coordinates: 53°41′2.5″N 1°51′18.1″W
- Region served: Calderdale
- Website: www.overgatehospice.org.uk

Overgate Hospice is a hospice and charity in Elland, West Yorkshire, England. It provides palliative care for the people of Calderdale.

== History ==
In the 1970s two Calderdale doctors, Drs Brian Quinn and Geoffrey Hyman created a charitable trust called the Calderdale Society for Continuing Care to establish a nursing home for palliative care. Initially they planned to convert and old convent in Boothtown; however this and other sites failed to materialised. Slyvia Graucob — the wife of Find Graucob, a Elland-based fire extinguisher manufacturer — purchased their old Elland home, Overgate and the adjoining property Hazeldene after her husband's death and donated the property to the charitable trust as a location for the hospice. Funds required to convert the property and for running costs for the first year was then raised by public donations, the local health authority, and a loan from Halifax League of Friends. The hospice was opened in September 1981 with facility for eight beds.

In 1994, a new purpose-built in-patient unit was added to the hospice, increasing the number of beds to 12. The hospice opened a day hospice for 5 days a week in 1995, which was initially in the original Overgate building.

The day hospice was moved to a purpose-built space in 2005, which was extended in 2011.

In April 2024, the hospice launched its Big Build Appeal to raise fundings for a new hospice facility, extending its current capabilities. The hospice has generated £9,700,000 of the required total, including funding from the Wolfson Foundation and is hoping to raise a total of £12,500,000 with the appeal.

== Fund raising ==
Fund raising to maintain the hospice is provided by public donations, fund-raising events, through the hospice's own choir, charitable foundation grants, a weekly lottery and 16 charity shops throughout Calderdale.

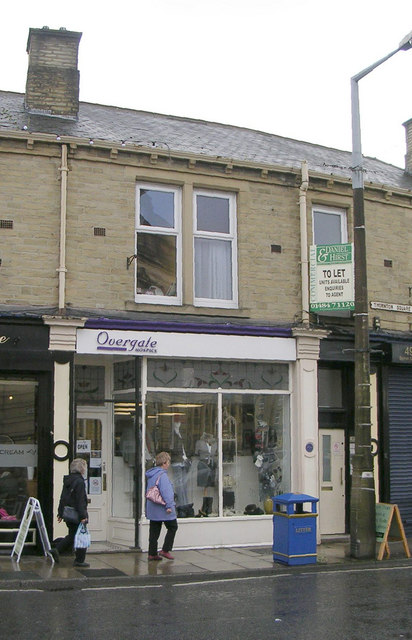
Overgate Hospice charity shop in Brighouse

=== Overgate Hospice Choir ===
The Overgate Hospice Choir was formed in 1991 initially to perform Joseph Haydn's choral work, The Creation as part of a National Voices for Hospices event. The choir continues today, with 65 voices performing four concerts a year.

=== Charity shops ===
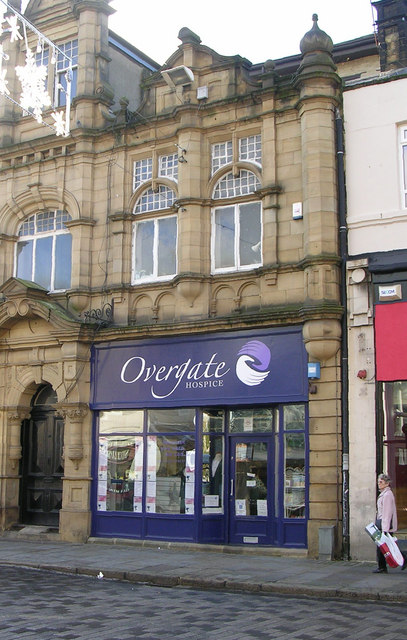
Overgate Hospice charity shop in Halifax

The hospice maintains a network of 16 charity shops and a distribution centre throughout Calderdale to support its fund-raising efforts. The hospice's first charity shop was opened in Hebden Bridge in 1994. The shops are located in Brighouse (four shops including a designer boutique, children's shop and furniture shop), Elland (two shops including a children's shop), Halifax, Hebden Bridge (furniture shop), Hipperholme, Illingworth, King Cross, Ovenden, Sowerby Bridge (two shops including a children's shop), Todmorden and West Vale.

== Administration ==
In 1994 the hospice trustees appointed its first full-time administrator, Norman Witter. The hospice is governed by a board of trustees, as of 2024 it is maintained by 12 trustees.

In 1994 the hospice cost £325,000 to run. In 2019, total expenditure was £4,250,000, with total income of £4,420,000. In 2023 the income of the hospice was £6,800,000 with an expenditure of £5,920,000.
