= Dundee and Angus College =

College in Scotland

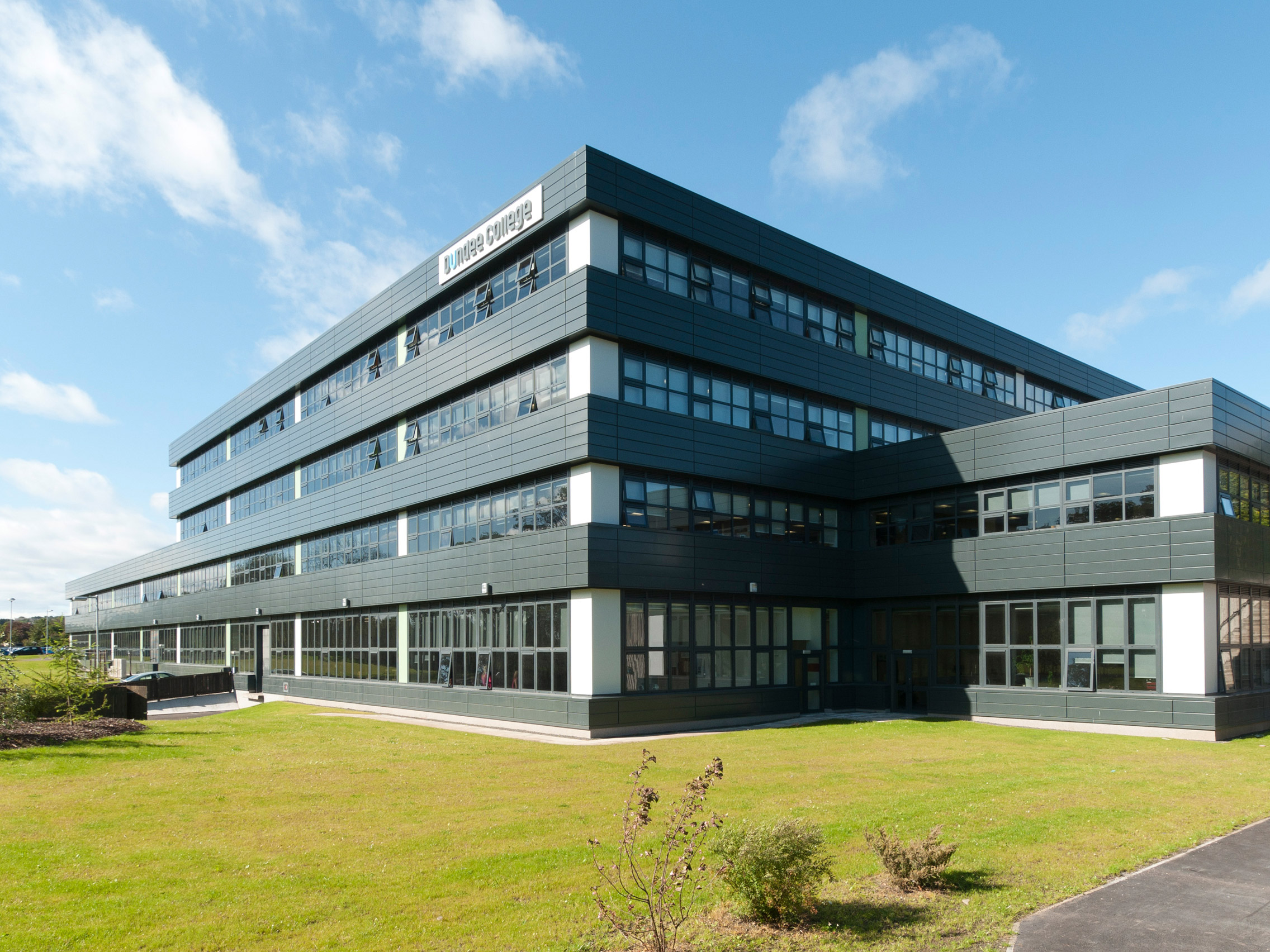
- Gardyne Campus (2009-)
- Motto: Leading Learning, Inspiring Success
- Type: Further education college
- Established: 1 November 2013
- Principal: Simon Hewitt
- Students: Over 18,000
- Location: Dundee and Arbroath, Scotland
- Website: www.dundeeandangus.ac.uk

Dundee and Angus College (Scottish Gaelic: Colaiste Dhùn Dèagh is Aonghais) is a further education college in the Tayside region of Scotland. It was created on 1 November 2013 as a merger of Angus College and Dundee College. It is the only college in Dundee and has a student population of over 18,000.

== Campuses ==
The college's main campuses are located in Arbroath and Dundee:

- Arbroath Campus, Keptie Road, Arbroath
- Kingsway Campus, Old Glamis Road, Dundee
- Gardyne Campus, Gardyne Road, Dundee

In November 2024, Dundee and Angus College confirmed plans to repurpose the Wellgate Centre into a new college campus as part of a ten year plan for the college which would see the closure of the Kingsway campus.

== History ==
When the merger was announced the new principal was named as Christina Potter, formerly principal of Dundee College. Following the retirement of Christina Potter, Grant Ritchie was appointed as principal, taking office on 1 August 2015. Grant supported the College in planning for the future through its 'Good to Great' project, which won the Campbell Christie award in 2018. Following Grant's retirement, Simon Hewitt, the College's Vice Principal Curriculum & Attainment was appointed as principal, taking office on 1 August 2020.

=== Angus College ===
Angus College was a college in Arbroath founded in 1956.

=== Dundee College ===
It was established in 1985 by the merger of Dundee College of Commerce and Kingsway Technical College.

== Courses ==
The College delivers over 900 courses from introductory level to degree and post graduate studies. It offers courses for people over the age of sixteen, involving school-level qualifications such as Higher Grade exams, work-based learning, vocational training as well as Further and Higher Education programmes leading to nationally and internationally recognised qualifications including SQA national and higher national certificates and diplomas. Dundee and Angus College also works closely with the city's universities and schools, providing access courses to gain credits needed for advancement to university and providing vocational courses for secondary school students aged 14 and 15 for a few hours a week in fields such as construction, and hairdressing and beauty therapy.

It has campuses and learning centres located across the Tayside region. In Dundee, the College has two campuses: the Kingsway Campus and the recently opened £48million Gardyne Campus.

Courses are offered in the following areas:

- Care, Social Science and Sport
- Creative, Cultural and Digital
- Business, Access and Education
- Science, Technologies and Landbased

== Centres of excellence ==
It has a number of centres of excellence including a New Media Centre which gives students access to the latest technology for working and learning in industries such as web design and for developing graphic and animation software; and The Space, a purpose-built venue for performance and training which is the home of the Scottish School of Contemporary Dance. The opening of the Gardyne Campus in 2011 saw the launch of the refurbished Gardyne Theatre, a 400-seat, lyric theatre, open to the public which is the venue for a range of performances including Scottish Opera, theatre groups, and musicians.

== Dundee and Angus College Students' Association ==
DASA is an autonomous, student-led, campaigning organisation, which provides services, representation and welfare support on behalf of its members – the College students.

The day-to-day operation of The Association is fulfilled by the three sabbatical officers, students who have finished college and work full-time for The Association.
