= Menzieshill High School =

School in Dundee, Scotland (1971–2016)

Coordinates: 56.4682°N 3.0293°W

Location
- Yarrow Terrace; Dundee, Dundee City Council (formerly Tayside), DD2 4DW; Scotland

Information
- Type: Secondary School
- Religious affiliation: any
- Established: 23 August 1971
- Closed: 1 July 2016
- Local authority: Dundee City Council
- Final Head Teacher: Helen Gray
- Final Deputy Head Teachers: T Stewart; L Waddell; K Archer; L Chacko
- Gender: Mixed
- Age: 11 to 18
- Enrolment: 596 (2013)
- Houses: Fortingall; Weem; Culdares; Aberfeldy
- Colour: Red green
- School years: S1 – S6
- Website: menzieshillhighschool.ea.dundeecity.sch.uk

Menzieshill High School was a co-educational secondary school located in the Menzieshill area of Dundee, Scotland. The last head teacher was Helen Gray. The school closed on 1 July 2016.

== History ==
Menzieshill High School was constructed with a cost under £1 million and opened in 1971. The school was one of Dundee's first comprehensive schools, accepting pupils from all backgrounds and regardless of their academic abilities. Menzieshill High School was one of the first schools in Dundee to offer home economics for boys and woodwork for girls.

In 1984, the women's Menzieshill Water Polo Club qualified to take part in the preliminary and quarter-final rounds of the ASA Championships at Liverpool University and won against Runnymede.

The school's intake decreased from the late 2000s to the early 2010s, with 487 pupils being enrolled at the school by the 2014/15 term, down from 662 pupils by the 2008/09 term.

=== Closure ===
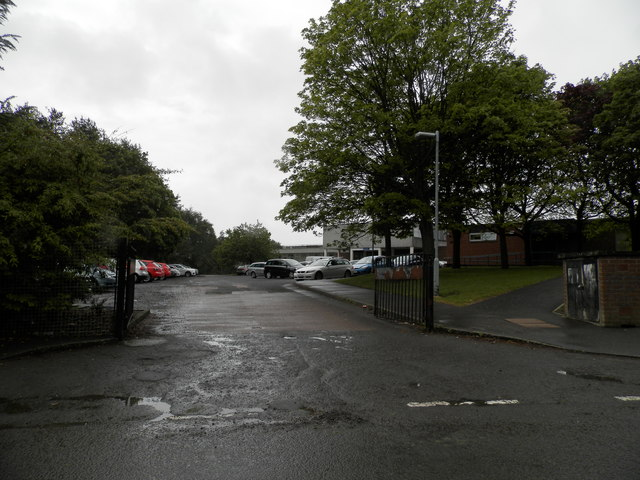
The school entrance in 2016

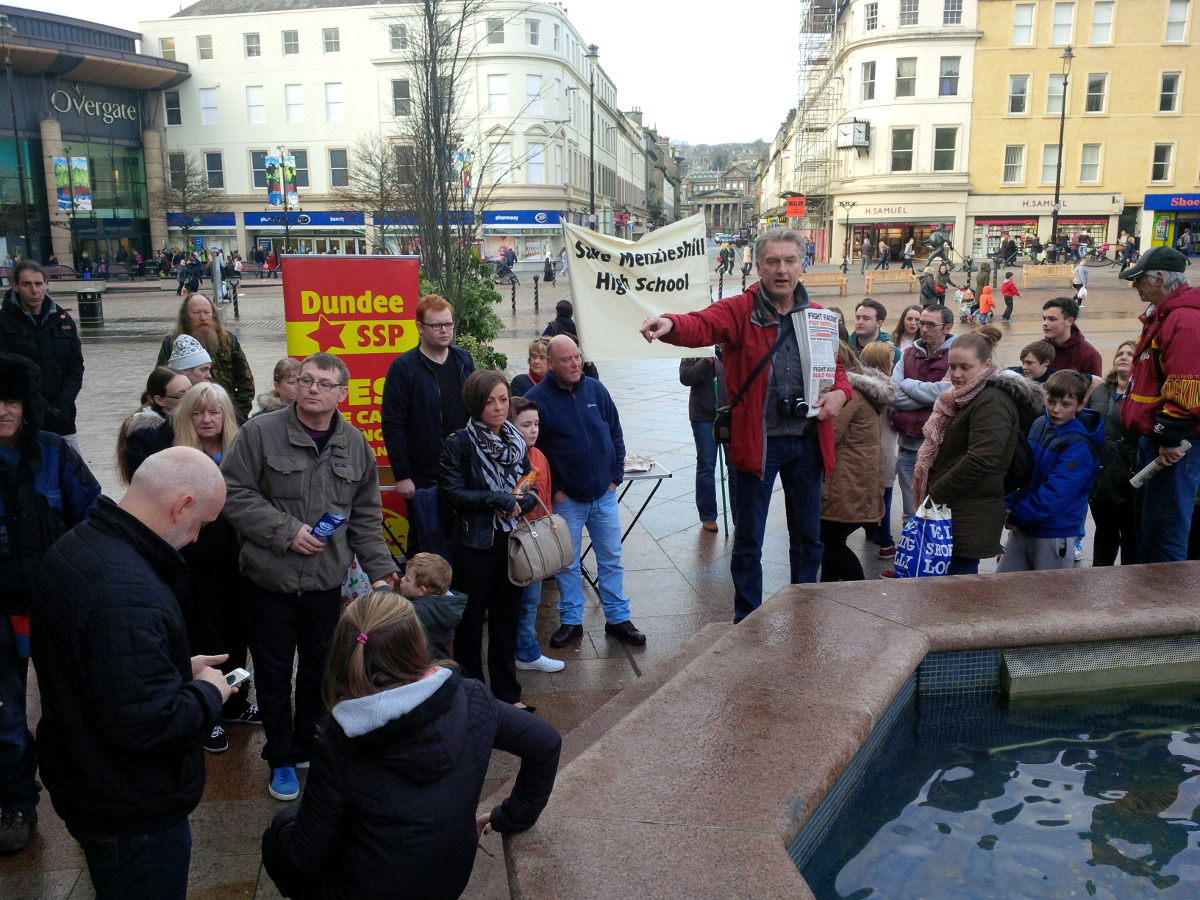
Demonstration outside Dundee City Chambers

In November 2014, Dundee City Council proposed to close Menzieshill High School and move the pupils to Harris Academy in 2016, when the new Harris building on Perth Road was built. The public consultation closed on 27 February 2015 and a final decision on whether to close the school was made on 22 June 2015 where 18 councillors voted in favour of the closure with 14 councillors against. Menzieshill Reverend Bob Mallinson said he would keep the fight going on and take it to parliament, but the government did not approve nor debate on the issue, confirming that the school would close as scheduled.

A senior SNP councillor said pupils would enjoy "better facilities" at Harris Academy.

There was a 'Save Menzieshill High' campaign which aimed to persuade the council to save the school. A public meeting was organised at Menzieshill Parish Church with the support of the Dundee branch of the Scottish Socialist Party and non-partisan local activists. Dozens of parents and pupils went on to demonstrate outside Dundee City Chambers while the council was setting its budget on 12 February.

== Pupils ==
The school catered for six hundred pupils aged between eleven-and-a-half to eighteen in First to Sixth Year, and admitted pupils from the Gowrie Park, Menzieshill, Charleston, Lochee and Dryburgh catchment areas of Dundee, as well as the villages of Longforgan and Inchture. This territory consists of a mixture of privately owned and council housing. The feeder primary schools were:

- Gowriehill Primary School
- Hillside Primary School
- Camperdown Primary School (formerly Lochee primary and Charleston Primary school
- Longforgan Primary School
- Inchture Primary School
- Dryburgh Primary School (until closure in 1985)

== Houses ==
Pupils at the school were organised into four houses: Aberfeldy, Fortingall, Weem and Culdares which are all named after Scottish villages associated with Clan Menzies.

== Badge and colours ==
The school badge consisted of a red, equilateral triangle supported by two grey trapezoids. The triangle represented the school; it was equilateral to show the school's commitment to equality of opportunity (as one of Dundee's first comprehensive schools, it did not select its pupils based on academic ability).

The trapezoids represented the buildings immediately surrounding the school in Menzieshill, many of which were grey and trapezoidal, whilst the green represented the abundant grassland that characterized the area.

The badge, therefore, showed that the school was at the heart of the community and was supported by it. Together, these elements formed a stylized "M" for Menzieshill.

Originally, the school colours were those of the school badge – bottle green, grey, and red – with the addition of black. The bottle-green blazers were highly distinctive but were later replaced by more traditional black ones. In the 1970s, the school uniform stipulated that other items had to be in "the school colours", which allowed pupils of both sexes to dress entirely (shirt, jumper, and trousers) in bottle-green or bright red if they so wished. Later, the uniform was changed to stipulate black or grey for trousers, although there was some leeway for "self-coloured" shirts and jumpers.
