= List of listed buildings in Fortingall, Perth and Kinross =

This is a list of listed buildings in the parish of Fortingall in Perth and Kinross, Scotland.

== List ==
Name	Location	Date listed	Geo-coordinates	Notes	Category	LB number	Image
Dunalastair			56°42′13″N 4°06′28″W		B	44621	Upload Photo
Glenlyon House - Farmhouse			56°35′55″N 4°03′38″W		B	13811	Upload Photo
War Memorial Churchyard Gate			56°35′53″N 4°03′04″W		C(S)	12290	Upload Photo
St. Blane's Chapel, Lassintullich Graveyard			56°41′35″N 4°07′54″W		C(S)	12233	Upload Photo
East Tempar, Farmhouse			56°41′28″N 4°08′19″W		C(S)	12234	Upload Photo
Glenlyon House With Surrounding Walls And Gates Etc			56°35′55″N 4°03′40″W		B	12266	Upload Photo
Bridge Of Lyon			56°35′40″N 4°04′23″W		B	12269	Upload another image See more images
Artrasgairt, Centre Group			56°36′01″N 4°04′11″W		C(S)	12271	Upload Photo
Bridge Of Balgie, Over River Lyon			56°35′28″N 4°19′09″W		B	12281	Upload Photo
Kinloch Rannoch Bridge Over River Tummel			56°42′00″N 4°11′12″W		B	12283	Upload Photo
Loch Rannoch, Killichonan, Grianan			56°41′25″N 4°22′24″W		B	51749	Upload Photo
Fortingal Parish Church			56°35′53″N 4°03′02″W		B	12288	Upload another image See more images
Fortingal Churchyard			56°35′53″N 4°03′03″W		C(S)	12289	Upload Photo
Mr Menzies Fortingal			56°35′54″N 4°03′11″W		C(S)	12294	Upload Photo
St. Blane's Chapel, Lassintullich Cross-Slab At S.W. Corner Of Grave-Yard			56°41′35″N 4°07′54″W		B	12232	Upload Photo
Aulich Bridge Over Allt A Chreagain Odhair			56°42′08″N 4°16′18″W		C(S)	12237	Upload Photo
Village Hall, Fortingal			56°35′54″N 4°03′25″W		B	12261	Upload Photo
Carnbane Castle			56°36′15″N 4°09′24″W		B	12276	Upload Photo
Glenlyon - Innerwick Church Of Scotland			56°35′54″N 4°18′05″W		B	12279	Upload Photo
Old Rannoch Church Of Scotland, Kinloch Rannoch			56°41′55″N 4°11′06″W		C(S)	12282	Upload Photo
Bunrannoch House			56°41′39″N 4°10′44″W		C(S)	12284	Upload Photo
Fortingall, Garth, Gentian House			56°36′21″N 4°01′34″W		C(S)	50777	Upload Photo
Grampian Hydro Electric Scheme, Rannoch Power Station			56°41′35″N 4°24′07″W		A	51716	Upload Photo
Meggernie Castle			56°35′02″N 4°21′22″W		A	13812	Upload Photo
Kirkton Cottages			56°35′54″N 4°03′10″W		B	12293	Upload Photo
Chemical Cottage			56°42′18″N 4°14′03″W		C(S)	12235	Upload Photo
Rannoch Lodge			56°41′02″N 4°26′21″W		B	12239	Upload Photo
Rannoch Station, Including Portrait Plaque Of J H Renton			56°41′09″N 4°34′37″W		B	12245	Upload another image See more images
Bridge Over Allt Odhar			56°35′51″N 4°03′34″W		C(S)	12265	Upload Photo
Garth Castle			56°37′44″N 4°00′59″W		B	12274	Upload Photo
Invervar, Burial Ground			56°36′30″N 4°10′06″W		C(S)	12277	Upload Photo
Grampian Hydro Electric Scheme, Rannoch Valve-House			56°42′02″N 4°24′12″W		B	51717	Upload Photo
Fortingal Manse			56°35′53″N 4°03′00″W		C(S)	12291	Upload Photo
The New Cottages			56°35′54″N 4°03′16″W		B	12296	Upload Photo
Fortingal Churchyard, Fortingal Yew And Stewart Of Garth Burial Enclosure			56°35′54″N 4°03′03″W		C(S)	12423	Upload Photo
Crossmount			56°41′44″N 4°06′54″W		B	12231	Upload Photo
Chemical Cottage Outbuilding			56°42′18″N 4°14′00″W		C(S)	12236	Upload Photo
Lyon View And Post Office, Fortingal			56°35′54″N 4°03′19″W		C(S)	12259	Upload Photo
Fendoch, Fortingal			56°35′54″N 4°03′21″W		C(S)	12260	Upload Photo
Balnald, Duncan Mcgregor			56°35′54″N 4°03′33″W		C(S)	12264	Upload Photo
Glenlyon House - Steading			56°35′56″N 4°03′39″W		B	12267	Upload Photo
Glenlyon House - Laundry And Garages			56°35′56″N 4°03′41″W		C(S)	12268	Upload Photo
Artrasgairt, East Group			56°36′01″N 4°04′10″W		C(S)	12272	Upload Photo
Dunalastair - East Lodge			56°42′27″N 4°04′51″W		B	13813	Upload Photo
Fortingal Hotel			56°35′53″N 4°03′06″W		B	12292	Upload Photo
Menzies View And Mr Todd Kirkton Cottage Fortingal			56°35′54″N 4°03′13″W		B	12295	Upload Photo
Eilean Nam Faoileag, Loch Rannoch, Tower			56°41′16″N 4°24′03″W		B	12241	Upload Photo
Bridge Of Gaur, Or Victoria Bridge			56°40′40″N 4°26′53″W		B	12242	Upload Photo
Invervar, Old Lint Mill			56°36′25″N 4°10′34″W		B	12278	Upload Photo
Limekiln Near Creagan Na Leacainn			56°42′56″N 4°06′27″W		C(S)	12285	Upload Photo
St. Blane's Chapel, Lassintullich			56°41′35″N 4°07′55″W		B	13810	Upload Photo
Balnald Sawmill			56°35′55″N 4°03′35″W		C(S)	12263	Upload Photo
Burial Ground Near Kerrowmore (Brenudh)			56°35′29″N 4°18′40″W		B	12280	Upload Photo
Burial Place Of Chiefs Of Clan Donnachaidh, Dunalastair			56°42′08″N 4°06′44″W		C(S)	12286	Upload Photo
Braes Of Rannoch Parish Church			56°40′39″N 4°26′17″W		B	12243	Upload Photo
Balnald			56°35′55″N 4°03′32″W		B	12262	Upload Photo
Tummel, Garry Hydro Electric Scheme, Errochty Power Station, Including Boundary Wall			56°42′33″N 4°00′23″W		B	51718	Upload Photo
Graveyard, Killichonan			56°41′31″N 4°22′42″W		C(S)	12238	Upload Photo
Rannoch Lodge Sundial			56°41′01″N 4°26′26″W		B	12240	Upload Photo
Rannoch School, Dall House			56°40′46″N 4°17′49″W		B	12244	Upload Photo
Culdaremore			56°35′49″N 4°04′26″W		B	12270	Upload Photo
Garth House (Youth Hostel)			56°36′17″N 4°01′32″W		B	12273	Upload Photo
Keltneyburn			56°37′03″N 3°59′59″W		B	12275	Upload Photo

== Key ==
The scheme for classifying buildings in Scotland is:

- Category A: "buildings of national or international importance, either architectural or historic; or fine, little-altered examples of some particular period, style or building type."
- Category B: "buildings of regional or more than local importance; or major examples of some particular period, style or building type, which may have been altered."
- Category C: "buildings of local importance; lesser examples of any period, style, or building type, as originally constructed or moderately altered; and simple traditional buildings which group well with other listed buildings."

In March 2016 there were 47,288 listed buildings in Scotland. Of these, 8% were Category A, and 50% were Category B, with the remaining 42% being Category C.
