= Menzieshill =

Area of Dundee, Scotland

Coordinates: 56.4668°N 3.0354°W

Menzieshill: Scottish Gaelic: Cnoc nam Mèinnearach; Scots: Menzieshull
- Location within Dundee City council area Location within Scotland
- Population: 4,400
- OS grid reference: NO363310
- Community council: Menzieshill
- Council area: Dundee City
- Lieutenancy area: Dundee
- Country: Scotland
- Sovereign state: United Kingdom
- Post town: DUNDEE
- Postcode district: DD2
- Dialling code: 01382
- Police: Scotland
- Fire: Scottish
- Ambulance: Scottish
- UK Parliament: Dundee West
- Scottish Parliament: Dundee City West

Menzieshill (Scots pronunciation: [ˌminɪsˈhɪɫ]) is a suburb and community council area in Dundee, Scotland. It is located in the west of the city, and is immediately north west of Blackness and the West End, west of Lochee, east of Gowrie Park and south of Charleston. Menzieshill is split into two parts: an eastern part of private housing, and a western part of council housing.

The name of the area derives from a farm that was situated on the ridge running westwards from Balgay Hill. The area became built up in the early 1960s to provide new housing for residents cleared from central areas of Dundee.

Menzieshill is home to Dundee's main water tower which serves the area.

Menzieshill was previously the location of Menzieshill High School, which opened in 1973 and closed in 2016. The school was located opposite the water tower. Ninewells hospital is also located to the immediate south of the area.

== Toponymy ==
Menzieshill is pronounced 'meengiss hill'. The original Scots spelling, Menȝieshill (cf. Menzies), containing the letter yogh, was later represented by the tailed z.

== People from Menzieshill ==
- Henry Jack FRSE (1917-1978) mathematician
- Sheli McCoy Gladiators (2024 British TV series) (1988-) Athlete
