= Gowrie Park =

Area of Dundee, Scotland

Coordinates: 56.467545°N 3.054946°W

- Location within Dundee City council area Location within Scotland
- Population: 849
- OS grid reference: NO351311
- Council area: Dundee City
- Lieutenancy area: Dundee
- Country: Scotland
- Sovereign state: United Kingdom
- Post town: DUNDEE
- Postcode district: DD2
- Dialling code: 01382
- Police: Scotland
- Fire: Scottish
- Ambulance: Scottish
- UK Parliament: Dundee West
- Scottish Parliament: Dundee City West

Gowrie Park is a residential area of Dundee, Scotland, United Kingdom. Sandwiched between Menzieshill and Dundee Technology Park, it is located in the western edge of the city. The Gowrie Park suburb was developed by local builders Bett Brothers in the 1970 and 80s and all homes are all privately owned. The streets all have names from places in the western Highlands of Scotland.

- Applecross Gardens
- Arisaig Gardens
- Canisp Crescent
- Dornie Place
- Durness Terrace
- Greenstone Place
- Greenstone Terrace
- Ledmore Terrace
- Lochinver Crescent
- Mallaig Avenue
- Peterburn Terrace
- Plockton Terrace
- Rosehall Gardens
- Strathaird Place
- Ullapool Crescent

Intersecting through the area is a small grass park, known locally as the Green Belt. Circumventing Gowrie Park is a cycle path, where the railway line to Lochee ran. At the South Road/Mallaig Avenue roundabout, some of the old Liff Station buildings (which closed around 1967) stand. The path of the railway can clearly be seen from above on Google Earth running directly behind Applecross Gardens and Peterburn Terrace. The cycle path (former rail line) is part of the Dundee green route which provides access to the Technology Park, Ninewells Hospital, the Kingsway dual carriageway to the west and Charleston, a sports centre and shops to the east.

The majority of the children who live in Gowrie Park attend Tayview Primary School then go on to Harris Academy. The area is within walking distance of local shops and Ninewells Hospital. There are also regular bus routes through the area.

The area is included in the Lochee council ward, yet is several miles from Lochee. The Councillors are Lee Mills, Roisin Smith, Siobhan Tolland (Scottish National Party), and Wendy Scullin, (Labour).
