= Mallaig High School =

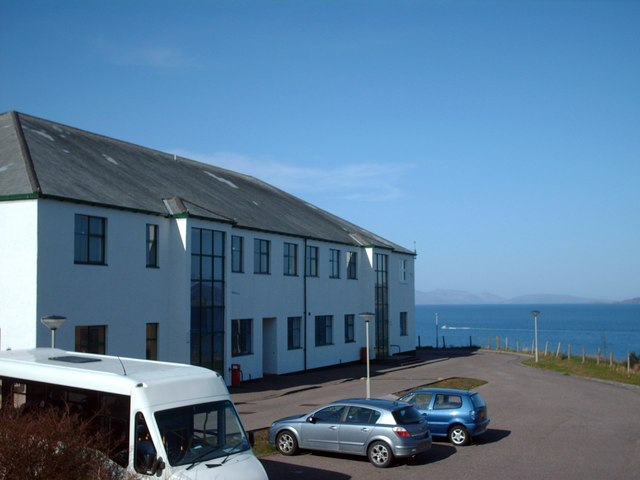

Location
- Annies Brae; Mallaig, PH41 4RG; Scotland; 57.001062°N 5.831812°W

Information
- Established: 1989
- Authority: The Highland Council
- Head teacher: Pamela Watt
- Scottish Highers: 1st Years – 6th Years
- Gender: Mixed
- Enrollment: 103
- Website: www.mallaighigh.org

Mallaig High School is a secondary school in Mallaig, Lochaber, Scotland. The school building opened in 1989. The current Acting Head Teacher is Pamela Watt who was appointed in 2023. Its associated primary schools are Arisaig Primary, Eigg Primary, Inverie Primary, Lady Lovat Primary, Mallaig Primary, Muck Primary and Rum Primary Next to the school is a leisure centre.
