= Charleston, Dundee =

Area of Dundee, Scotland

Coordinates: 56.473084°N 3.037243°W

Charleston: Scottish Gaelic: Baile Thearlaich; Scots: Charlestoun
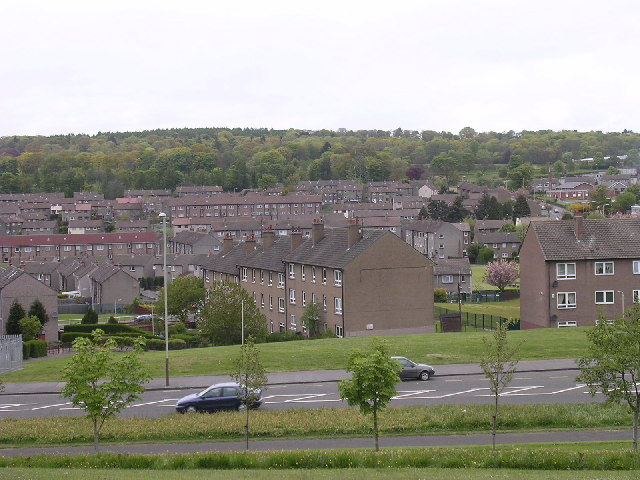

- Location within Dundee City council area Location within Scotland
- Population: 4,323
- OS grid reference: NO362317
- Council area: Dundee City
- Lieutenancy area: Dundee
- Country: Scotland
- Sovereign state: United Kingdom
- Post town: DUNDEE
- Postcode district: DD2
- Dialling code: 01382
- Police: Scotland
- Fire: Scottish
- Ambulance: Scottish
- UK Parliament: Dundee West
- Scottish Parliament: Dundee City West

Charleston is an area on the northwest edge of Dundee, Scotland. Menzieshill is to the immediate southwest, Camperdown borders it to the north, and Lochee is to the east.

The area is home to two primary schools - Camperdown Primary (multi-religious) and St Clement's Primary (Catholic) - as well as a library and a variety of small shops. Charleston is a very quiet and small suburb. Thoroughfares include South Road, Dunholm Road, Buttars Loan and Brown Hill Road. There is one play park locally, named Sandy Park.

George Galloway (born 1954) the former Member of Parliament (MP) grew up in Charleston.

== Balgarthno Stone Circle ==
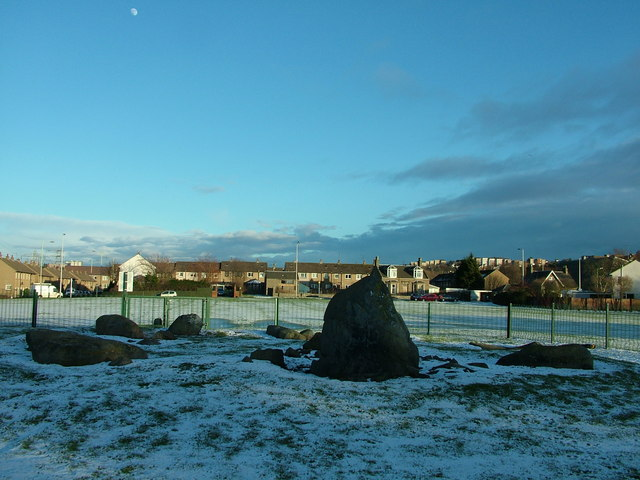
Balgarthno Stone Circle, a late Neolithic/Bronze Age stone circle in Charleston, Dundee. Locally known as the Myrekirk.

Designations

Scheduled monument
- Official name: Gourdie, stone circle 850m S of
- Designated: 15 September 1935
- Reference no.: SM128

The Balgarthno Stone Circle is a late Neolithic/Bronze Age stone circle in Charleston. It is known locally as the Myrekirk.
