= Aberfeldy =

Aberfeldy may refer to:

== Places ==
- Aberfeldy, Victoria, Australia
- Aberfeldy, Ontario, Canada
- Aberfeldy Village, London, England
- Aberfeldy, Perth and Kinross, Scotland
- Aberfeldy, Free State, South Africa

== Other uses ==
- Aberfeldy (band), a Scottish indie/chamber pop band
- Aberfeldy (whisky), a brand of Scottish Malt Whisky
- Aberfeldy River, Victoria, Australia

== See also ==
- Aberfeldie, Victoria, Australia, a suburb of Melbourne
