= Menzies of Culdares =

Col. James Menzies of Culdares b.1529 d.1573, was the first of the Culdares line and son to Sir Alexander Menzies, b.1504 d.1563. The Menzies of Culdares came to prominence following the extinction of the main Menzies of Weem line in 1911. The Clan was without a Chief until Col. Ronald Steuart Menzies of Culdares, Grant of Arndilly and Stewart of Cardney, the lineal heir of Colonel James Menzies of Culdares, a prominent Covenanting officer and cousin of the first Baronet, petitioned Lyon Court in 1957 and obtained arms in the title of "The Menzies of Menzies". His grandson, Robert Ronald Menzies of Menzies is the present Chief. The title Menzies of Culdares was matriculated to his second son, Simon Menzies of Culdares, in 2006. Meggernie Castle in Glen Lyon, Perthshire was the Seat of the Culdares line

== History of Menzies of Culdares ==
Scotland is indebted to the Menzies of Culdares for the introduction of the larch tree which now flourishes all over the Highlands. Menzies of Culdares, "Old Culdares", who had been pardoned for his participation in the 1715 Jacobite rising, brought the first larches from the Austrian Tyrol in 1737 and presented them to the Duke of Atholl. Two of the original saplings, now grown to a great size, can be seen beside Dunkeld Cathedral.

Culdares, near Fortingall, Perthshire is the possible site of a castle or old house. It was held by the Moncreiffes, but passed to the Menzies family. Colonel James Menzies of Culdares was a Royalist officer during the Civil War in the seventeenth century and was wounded nine times in various fights. Menzies of Culdares fought for the Jacobites in the 1715 Rising, but was captured after the rebellion and was exiled to North America. He was an agricultural improver, and introduced the larch to Scotland. He was too old to take part in the 1745-46 Rising, but sent Bonnie Prince Charlie a fine horse, delivered by his servant, MacNaughton.

Stewart of Garth makes most honourable mention of Macnuaghton, who was in the service of Menzies of Culdares in the year 1745. That gentleman had been "out" in 1715, and was pardoned. Grateful so far, he did not join Prince Charles, but sent a fine charger to him as he entered England. The servant, Macnaughton, who conveyed the present, was taken and tried at Carlisle. The errand on which he had come was clearly proved, and he was offered pardon and life if he would reveal the name of the sender of the horse. He asked with indignation if they supposed that he could be such a villain. They repeated the offer to him on the scaffold, but he died firm to his notion of fidelity. His life was nothing to that of his master, he said.
