= Meggernie Castle =

Castle in Perth and Kinross, Scotland

Coordinates: 56.5839°N 4.3563°W

Designations

Inventory of Gardens and Designed Landscapes in Scotland
- Official name: Meggernie Castle
- Designated: 1 July 1987
- Reference no.: GDL00277

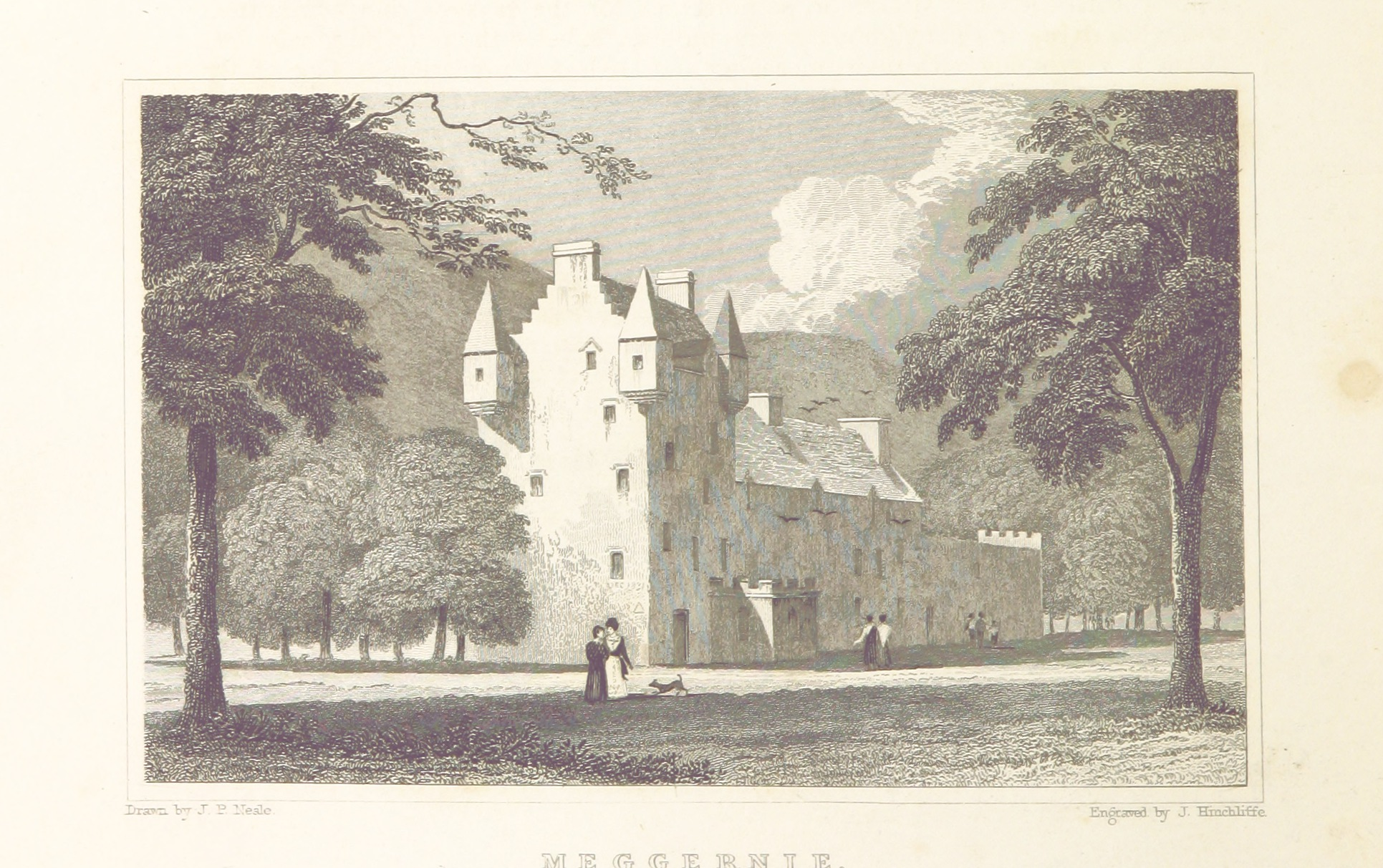
Drawing of Meggernie Castle by Thomas H. Shepherd, 1829

Meggernie Castle is a castle in the heart of Perth and Kinross, in central Scotland. It is located halfway up Glen Lyon, where the river Lyon flows through on its way to join the river Tay, shortly below Loch Tay. From 1920, until his death in 1958 the castle was owned by Sir Ernest Wills, 3rd Baronet JP, CStJ. From 1958, until its sale in 1979, the castle was owned by Sir Ernest's son and successor to the baronetcy; Lt. Col. Sir (Ernest) Edward de Winton-Wills, 4th Baronet of Hazelwood.

== Etymology ==
The name Meggernie may be of Pictish origin. It may be derived from an element cognate with Welsh migwernedd, meaning "boggy meadow".

== History ==
Prior to the construction of Meggernie Castle, there is evidence that a thatched keep of some sort was erected on the site. The exact date of the erection of the oldest existing part of Meggernie Castle has not been determined, although there is evidence of it belonging to Clan Gregor, and them also being the original builders. They were slowly being driven out of their lands which accounts for the Barony of Glenlyon being given to the Campbells, rivals and neighbours of the MacGregor Clan. There is a document known as the "Register of the Great Seal," in which King James VI grants to the Campbell family the ownership of land in the area to form the Barony of Glenlyon. The chief of this Barony is said to reside in "the Tower named Meggernie" and since this bequest is dated 4 March 1603, this evidence ties in loosely with the construction date of 1585. The thatched keep had a slated roof added to it initially by Robert Campbell of Glenlyon and additions were also made in later years.

== Architecture ==
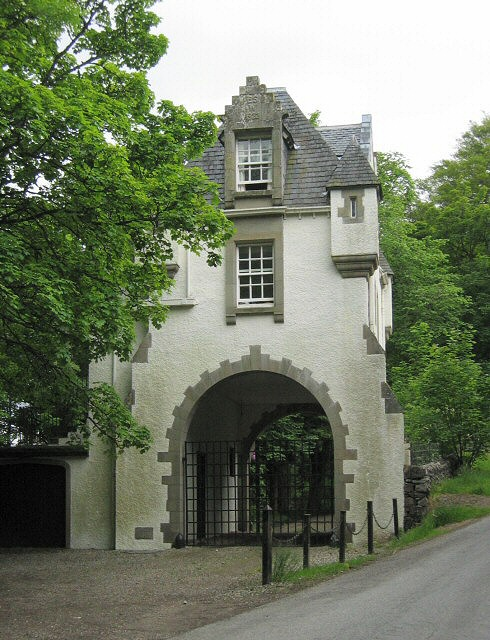
The gatehouse

The walls of the castle are around five feet in thickness in keeping with its role as a defensive structure and in total the castle is five storeys tall. Each corner of the castle possesses a square tower which is bracketed out from the main body of building. The original castle had few windows and those that do exist are narrow slits in the wall. This style is entirely in keeping with the fashion of the day and can be seen in numerous other fortified castles and keeps constructed around the same time. The original castle keep has also had a more modern mansion house attached to it since its construction, although the style of this is still in keeping with that of the original building. Many architectural details of Meggernie can be clearly seen in photographs of the building, including the four small square towers at the corners of the keep, and the long, low mansion house which extends from one side of the keep.

== Haunting ==
Several ghost stories surround Meggernie Castle, the best-known dating from the time that the house was occupied by the Menzies's of Culdares. An early Menzies of Culdares married a very beautiful woman much younger than himself. However, her youth and attractiveness led him to become jealous of her and he is said to have murdered her in a fit of rage. After concealing her body in a locked chest in one of the castle towers, he absented himself for some time and, after his return, spread the story of how his wife had tragically met her death by drowning whilst the two of them had been travelling in Europe. Although the locals believed the story, Menzies still felt anxious and fearful and decided to dispose of the body in the nearby churchyard. Having cut the body in two, he managed to bury the lower half in the graveyard one night, leaving the upper part still in the chest. However, before he was able to bury the upper half, he met with foul play and the next morning his body was found at the entrance to the tower where the upper part of his wife's body still lay. Although Menzies had clearly been murdered, nobody was ever tried for the crime and his death remains a mystery.

Most ghost sightings have involved guests staying at the castle who claim to have seen the upper part of a woman's body floating through the air. One visitor to the castle claims to have been awakened one night by the feeling of a red hot kiss on his cheek. When he sat up in bed, he saw the ghostly form of a woman's torso moving away from his bed towards the wall, before passing through into the next room.

During restoration work at the castle in the mid-19th century, workmen are said to have unearthed skeletal remains of the upper half of a woman's body. These were removed for burial, but sightings of her ghost were reported after this occurred. Claims have also been made that the buried lower half of the body haunts the nearby churchyard.
