= Mallaig =

Scottish Highland port town

Coordinates: 57.003813°N 5.8271730°W

Mallaig: Scottish Gaelic: Malaig
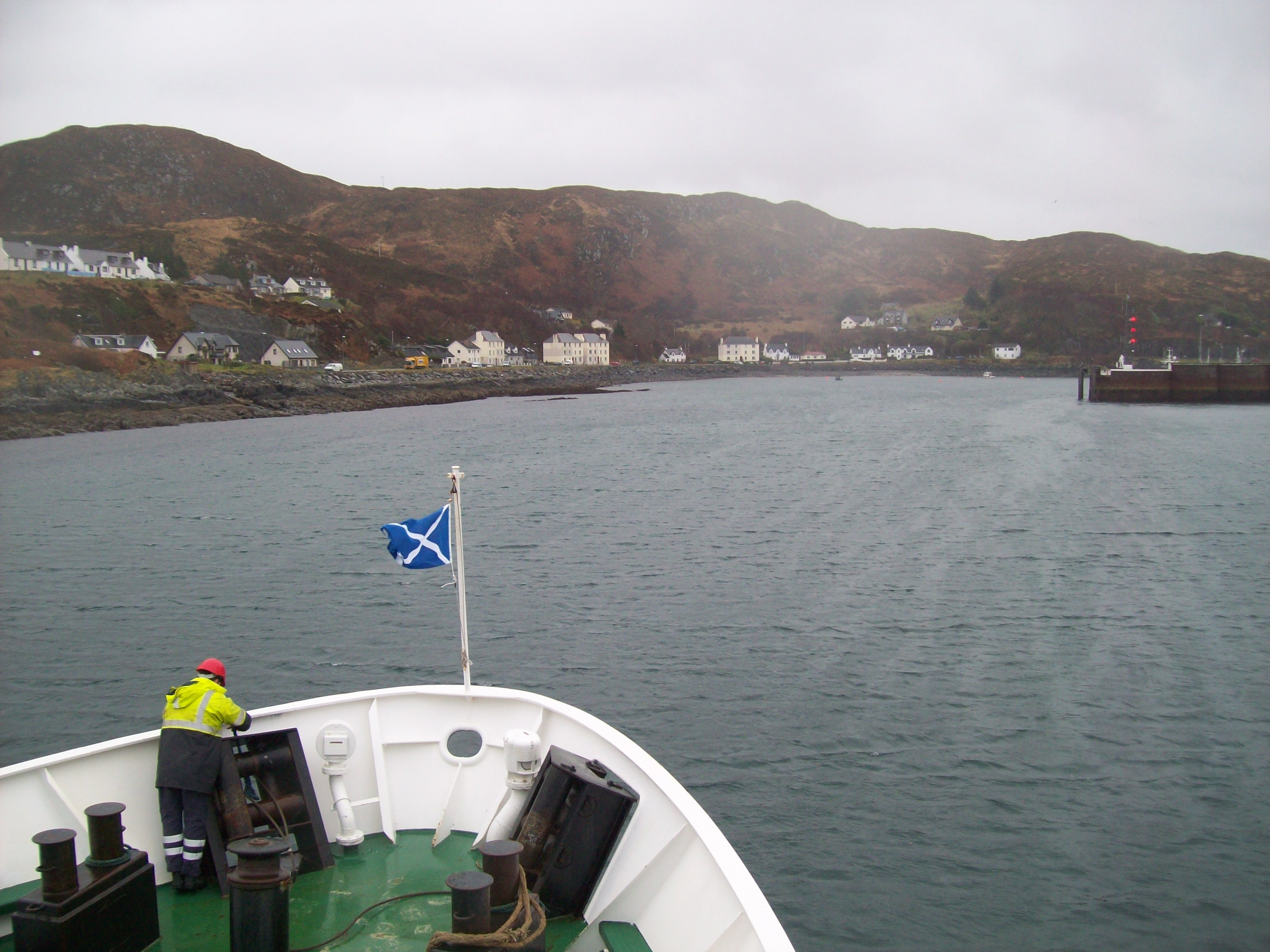
- Approaching Mallaig harbour on the ferry from the Isle of Skye.

- Location within the Lochaber area
- Population: 660 (2020)
- OS grid reference: NM 67693 96810
  - Edinburgh: 124 mi (200 km)
  - London: 444 mi (715 km)
- Council area: Highland
- Lieutenancy area: Inverness
- Country: Scotland
- Sovereign state: United Kingdom
- Post town: MALLAIG
- Postcode district: PH41
- Dialling code: 01687
- Police: Scotland
- Fire: Scottish
- Ambulance: Scottish
- UK Parliament: Inverness, Skye and West Ross-shire
- Scottish Parliament: Skye, Lochaber and Badenoch

Mallaig (/ˈmæleɪɡ/; Scottish Gaelic: Malaig [ˈmal̪ˠɛkʲ]) is a port in Morar, on the west coast of the Highlands of Scotland. It faces Skye from across the Sound of Sleat. The local railway station is the terminus of the West Highland Line (Fort William and Mallaig branch), and the town is linked to Fort William by the A830 road – the "Road to the Isles".

== Development ==
The village of Mallaig was founded in the 1840s when Lord Lovat, owner of North Morar Estate, divided up the farm of Mallaigvaig into 17 parcels of land and encouraged his tenants to move to the western part of the peninsula and turn to fishing as a way of life. The Second Edition (1888–1913) Six inch Ordnance Survey Map of Mallaig shows the village at the point in time when the railway was approaching. The population and local economy expanded rapidly in the 20th century with the arrival of the railway, which opened in 1901. The fishery statistics for the years up to the First World War illustrate this development:

Fishery Statistics

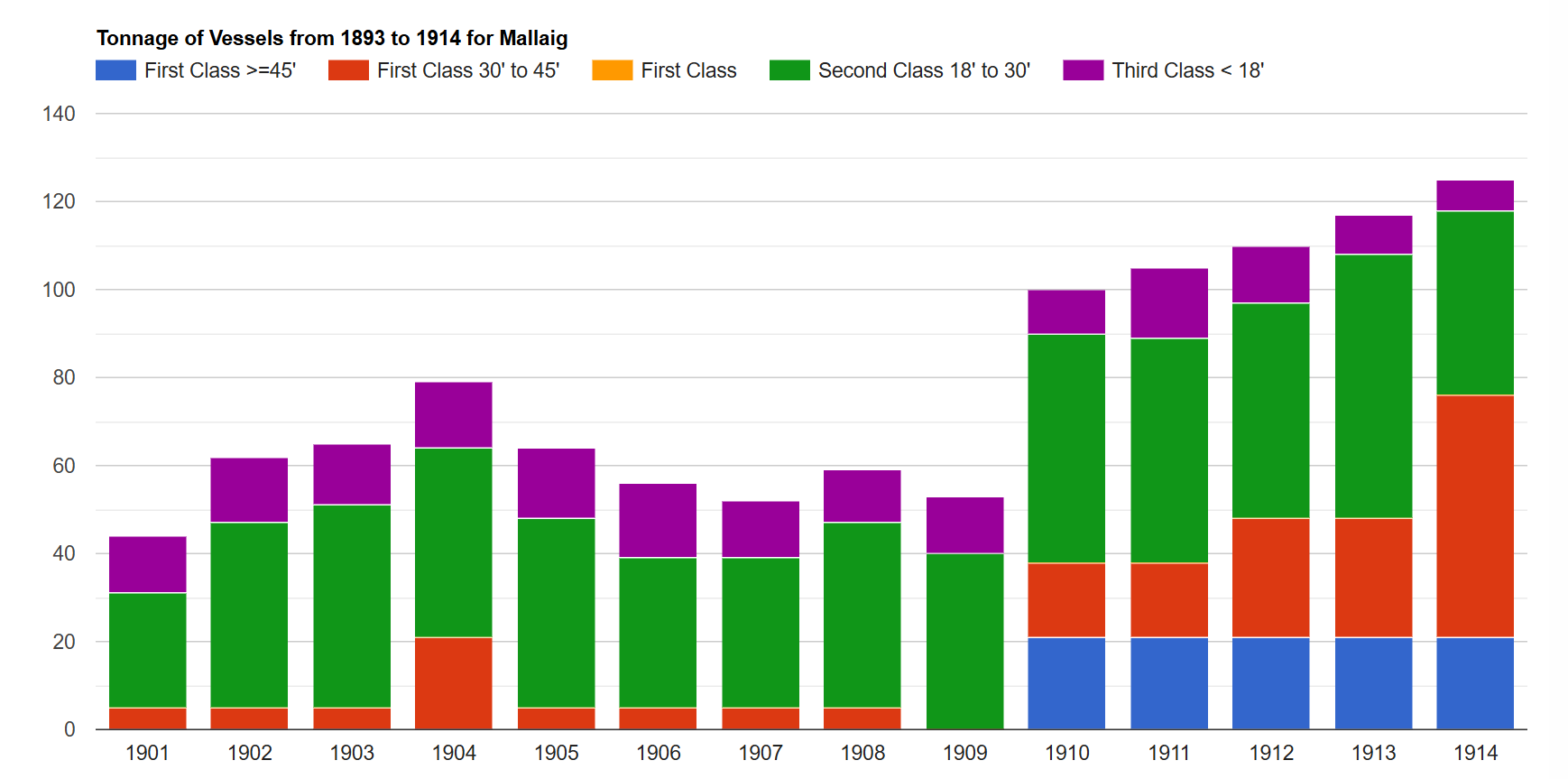
Tonnage of vessels

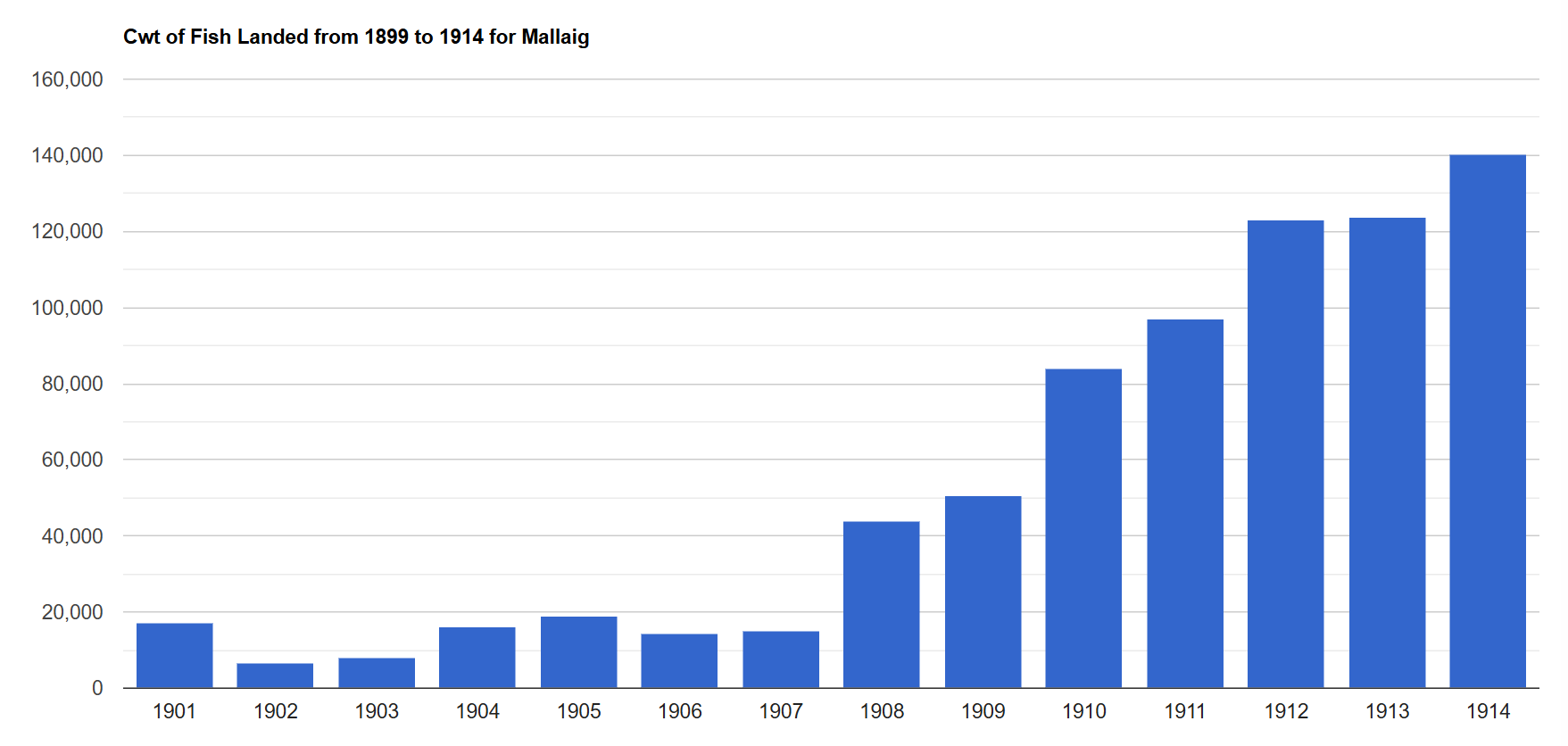
Cwt of fish landed

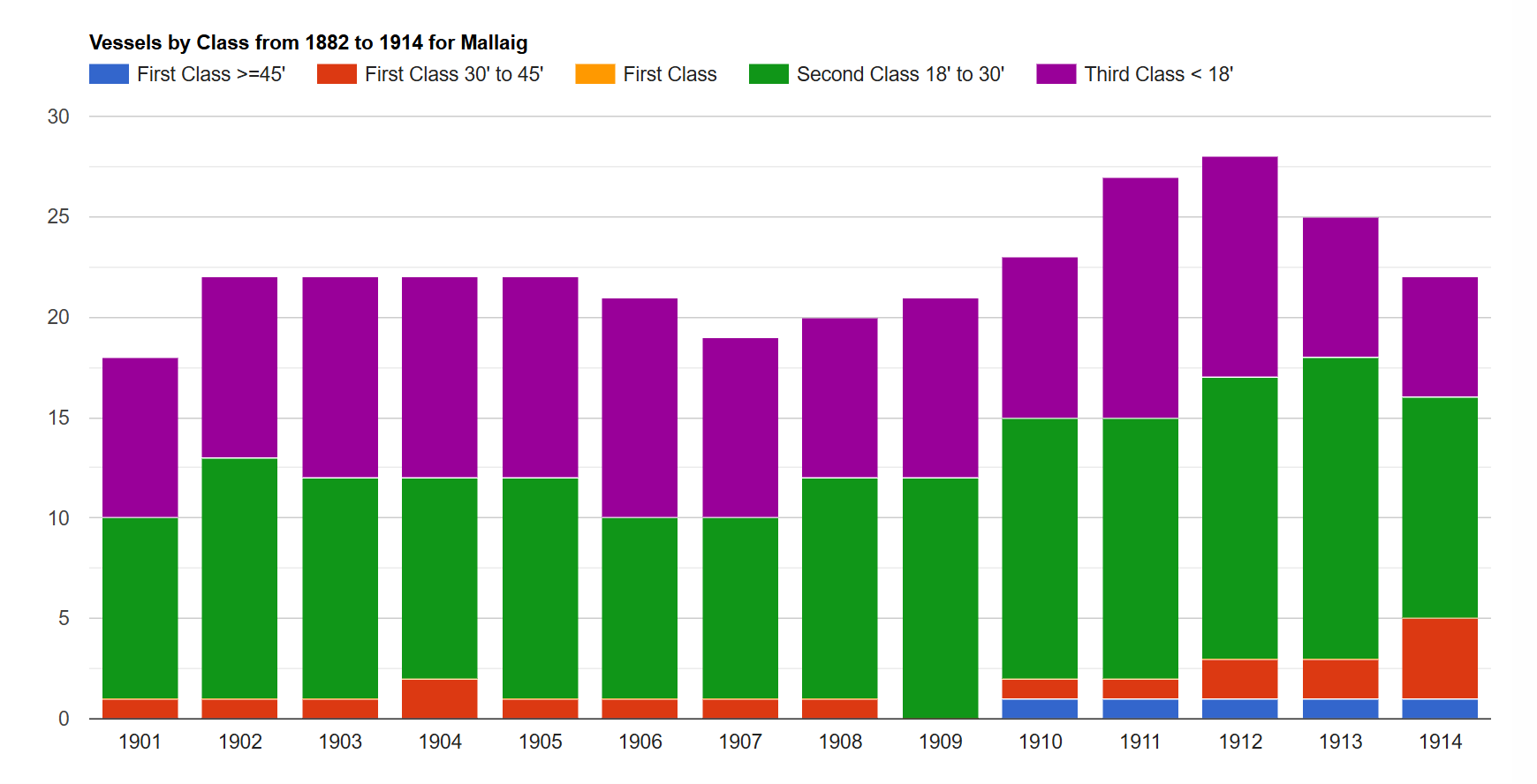
Vessels by class

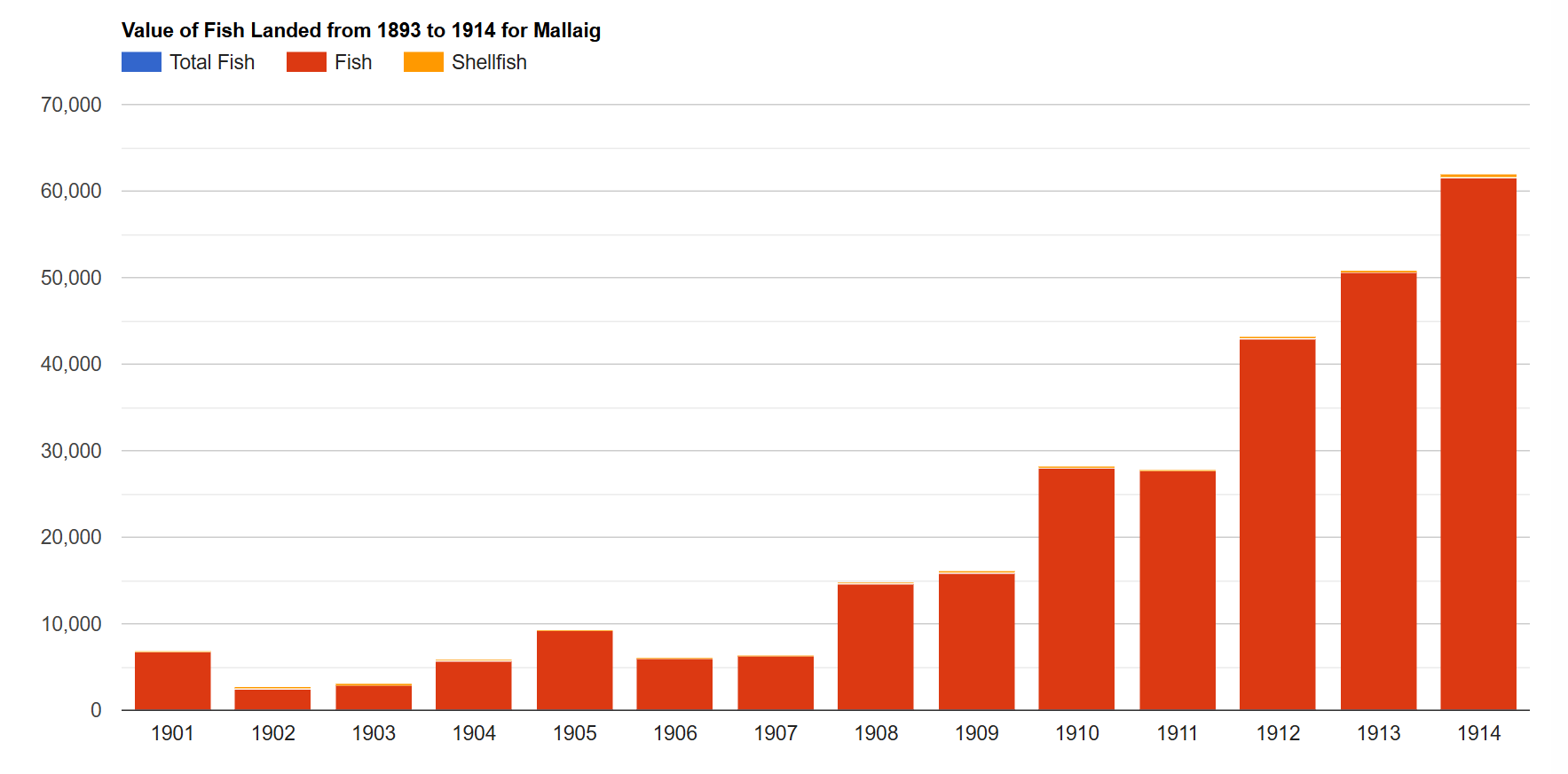
Value (£) of fish landed

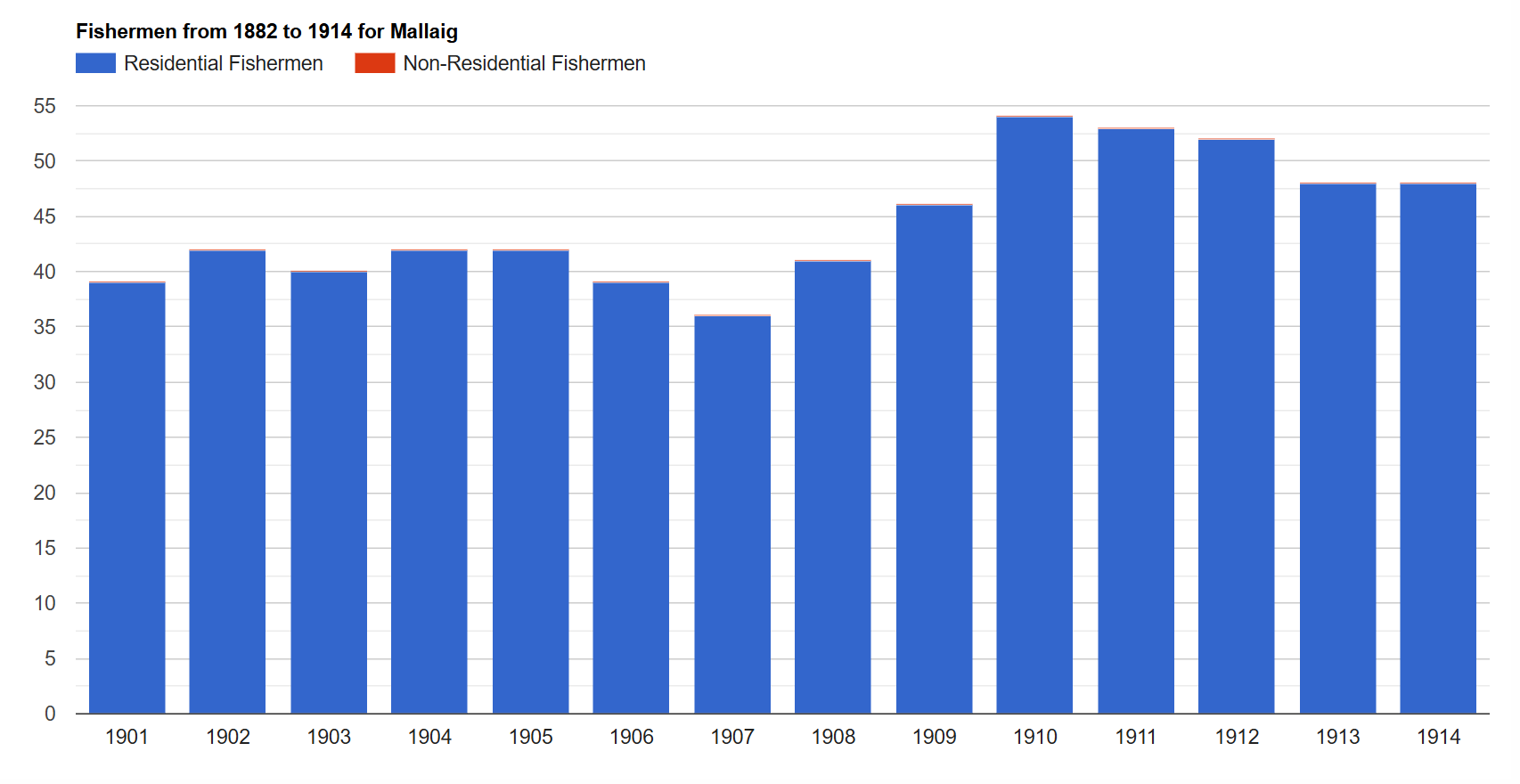
Fishermen

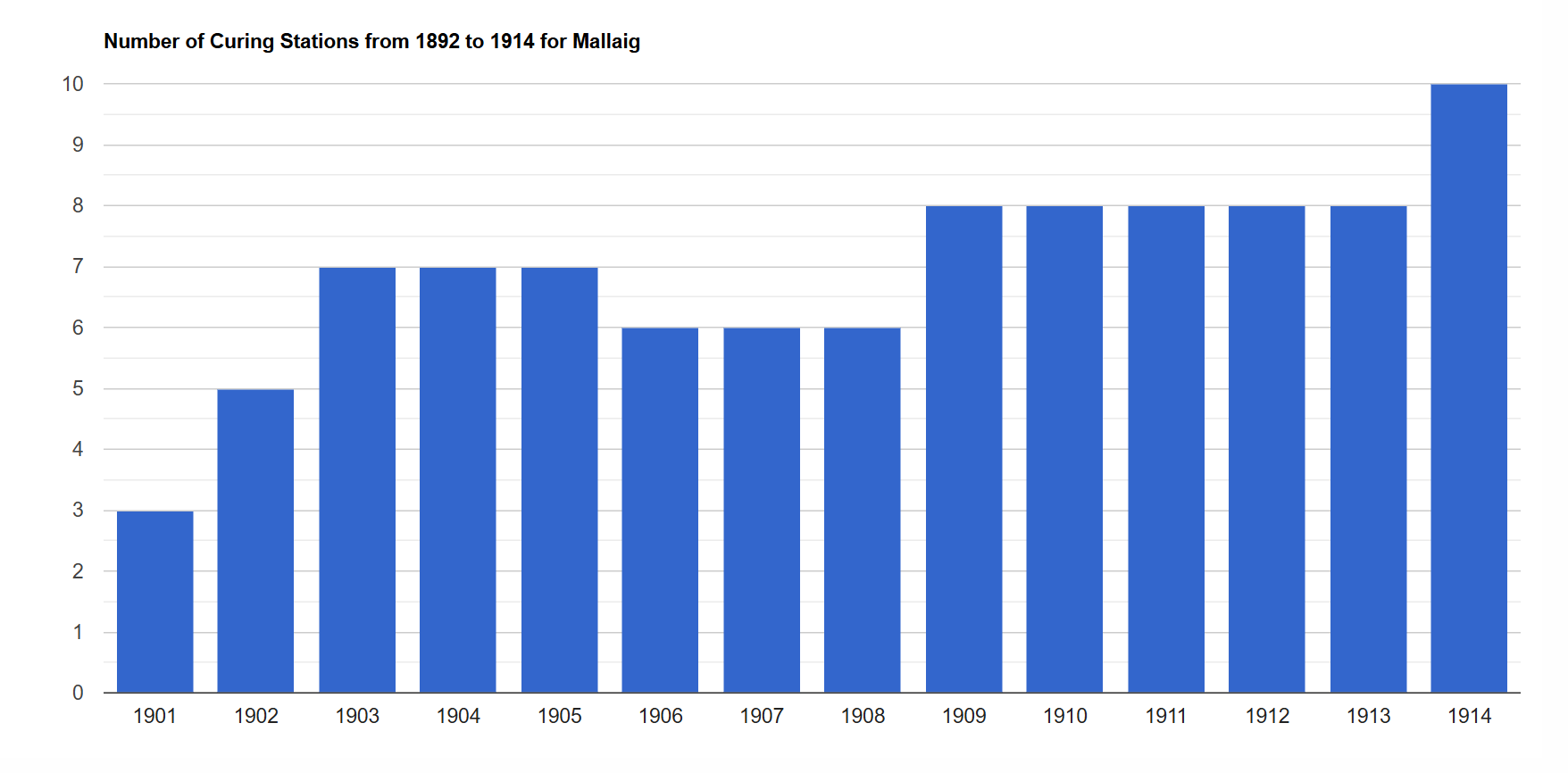
Number of curing stations

In the annual reports from 1909 onward the figures refer to Mallaig and South Morar. The report for 1912 highlights the importance of Mallaig's rail link "Not until after the extension of the N.B. Railway to the Minch was Mallaig know asa a fishing station. It has now become an important landing and fishing centre, chiefly for East Coast fishermen. A number of these have made it their permanent place of residence, and others, including West Coast men, will do so when improved housing accommodation is provided".

Ferries operated by Caledonian MacBrayne and Western Isles Cruises sail from the port to Armadale on the Isle of Skye, Inverie in Knoydart, Lochboisdale on South Uist and the isles of Rùm, Eigg, Muck, and Canna. Mallaig is the main commercial fishing port on the west coast of Scotland, and during the 1960s was the busiest herring port in Europe. Mallaig and the surrounding area is a popular area for holidays.

Most of the community speaks English, with a minority of residents speaking both English and Gaelic. In addition, traditional Gaelic is still taught in Mallaig Primary School to pupils who choose to learn the language.

== Education ==
Mallaig has extensive distance-learning facilities, allowing the local population access to all forms of education from leisure classes to university degrees through Lochaber College and the UHI Millennium Institute. The college is one of the most successful of its kind in Britain, with over 8 per cent of the local population accessing its facilities. Recently the Learning Centre has opened a marine-specific vocational centre and is at the forefront of developing Marine Certification courses for fishermen, as well as being a RYA certified centre.

Mallaig has its own primary school, which recently accepted the Gaelic-medium pupils from Lady Lovat Primary School in the nearby village of Morar. This allows Lady Lovat to focus more on its English-medium students.

Mallaig has a high school called Mallaig High School, which opened in 1989, although a secondary school had existed in a slightly different location. This caters for Mallaig, the villages of Morar and Arisaig, the nearby Small Isles of Eigg, Rùm, Muck and Canna, and the nearby Knoydart peninsula. The school has growing numbers of pupils from the Small Isles, unable to travel daily from home. These pupils are boarded in the school's hostel.

== Local services ==
Mallaig has several restaurants, cafes and takeaways, also a community-run swimming pool and leisure centre. The main focus is on the summer tourist trade, although some facilities open all year round, including the swimming pool. Mallaig has three hotels, much self-catering accommodation and several guest houses.

The village has a bank and three pubs. The compact centre is close to the harbour and railway station, with residential areas beyond to the south and east of the harbour. Most of the retail premises are on the main street, or on Davies Brae, which runs south from the centre. The swimming pool is at the high point of the village on Fank Brae.

There are two minimarkets and gift shops. An art gallery sells work by local artists. There is a small bookshop. A heritage centre next to the railway station is based around old photographs of the locality, but as Mallaig has only existed during the age of photography this offers a good introduction to the history and heritage of the locality. There are Roman Catholic and Church of Scotland churches, and a Fishermen's Mission facility run by the Royal National Mission to Deep Sea Fishermen. There is a small petrol station with restricted opening times near the harbour.

== Transport ==
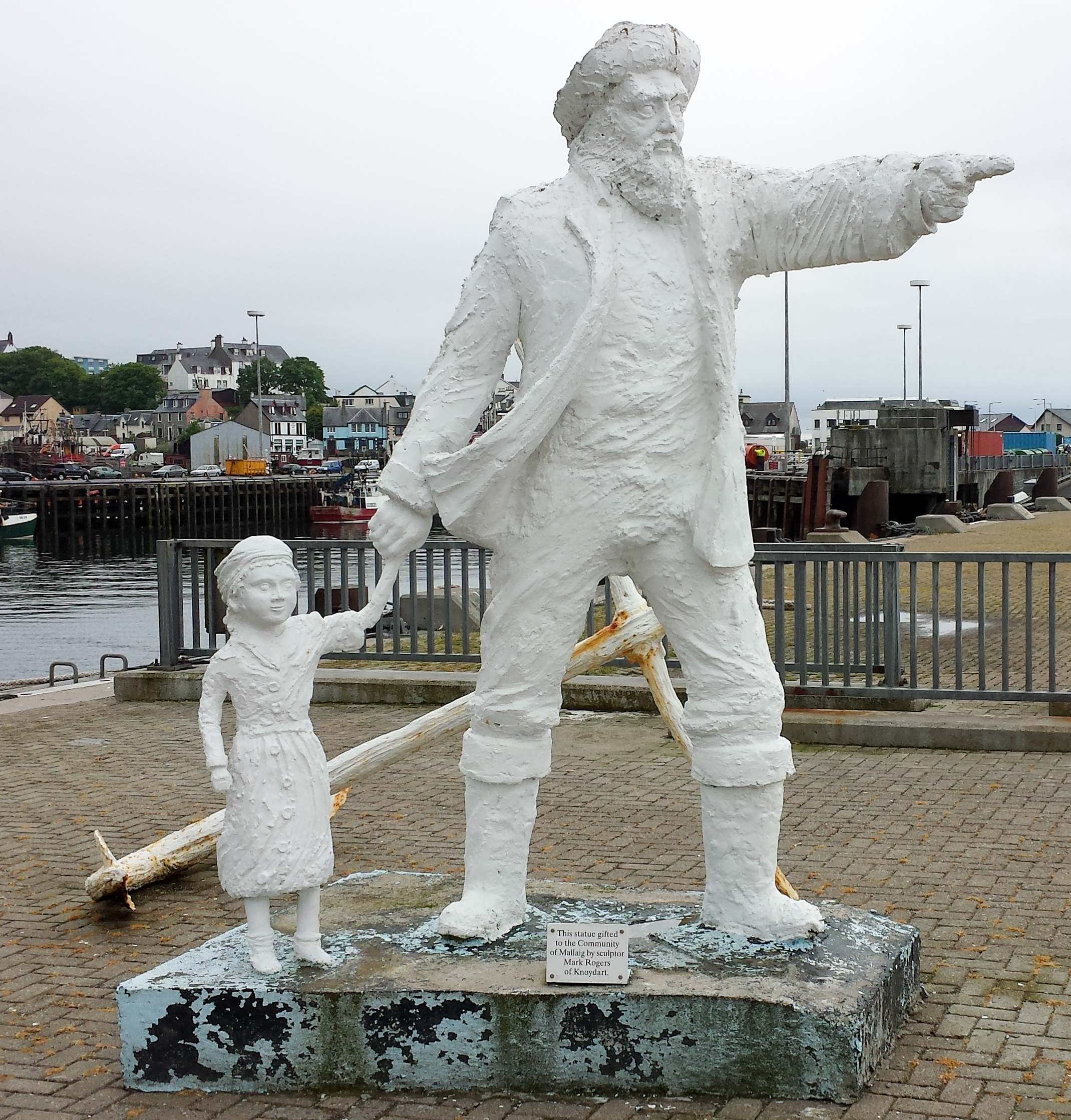
The Fisherman and Child sculpture by Mark Rogers at the entrance to Mallaig harbour

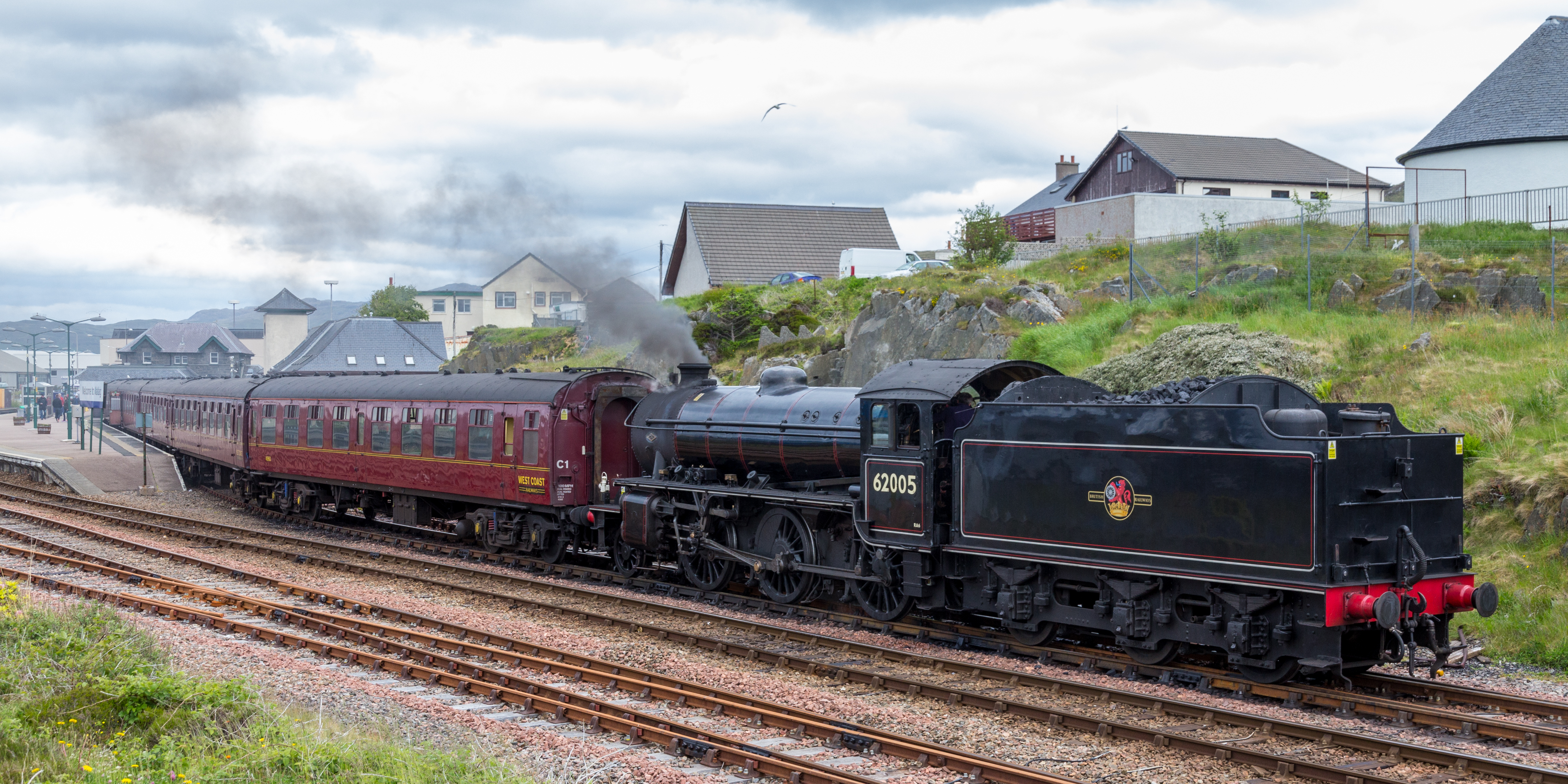
'The Jacobite' at Mallaig railway station

Completed in 1901, the West Highland Line links Mallaig railway station to Fort William, Oban and Glasgow. The line was voted the top rail journey in the world by readers of the independent travel magazine Wanderlust in 2009, ahead of the iconic Trans-Siberian and the Cuzco to Machu Picchu line in Peru. The five-hour trip to Glasgow Queen Street railway station passes through seascapes, loch sides, mountain and moorland terrain. It offers views of Loch Lomond, the Gare Loch, Rannoch Moor, Ben Nevis, Glenfinnan, Glen Shiel and Loch Eil. The line also runs along the Clyde between Helensburgh and Glasgow and offers views across the estuary. In the years before the First World War, after the opening of the line in 1901, there was a fairly steady increase in the value of fish sold, exceeding £60,000 in 1914.

In the summer the Jacobite steam train service from Fort William visits Mallaig.

Shiel Buses operates a service from Mallaig to Fort William. Buses also run south along the A861 to the villages of Acharacle and Strontian.

Mallaig is an important ferry port, with regular Caledonian MacBrayne services to Armadale on the Isle of Skye, a 30-minute sailing operated by MV Loch Fyne and MV Lord of the Isles, the latter operating the morning service from Lochboisdale on South Uist to Mallaig, before shuttling between Mallaig and Armadale, then working the evening service back to Lochboisdale. It also runs a daily service operated by the MV Lochnevis, purpose-built for the route to the Small Isles of Canna, Rùm, Eigg and Muck, although the timetable and itinerary differ from day to day.

A local ferry service sails daily to Inverie in Knoydart, a remote village, and also calls by arrangement at Tarbet in Morar, a location only accessible by sea. This service also offers a non-landing cruise through Loch Nevis.

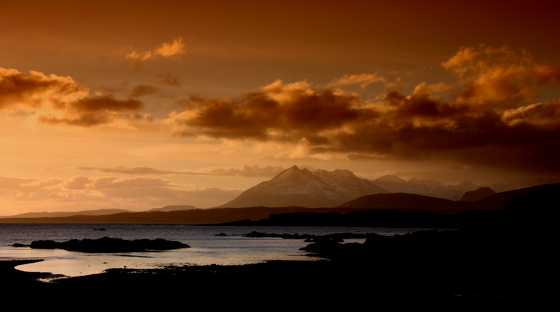
Sunset over the Sound of Sleat

== Mallaig as filming location ==
The Mallaig railway was used during the filming of the Harry Potter series of films, and the Hogwarts Express could often be seen in the summer during periods of filming. Many other local areas were used for location filming.

The 1996 film Breaking the Waves was largely filmed in Mallaig and the surrounding area, and the beach scenes of Local Hero were filmed at Morar and Arisaig, a few miles to the south.

== Gallery ==
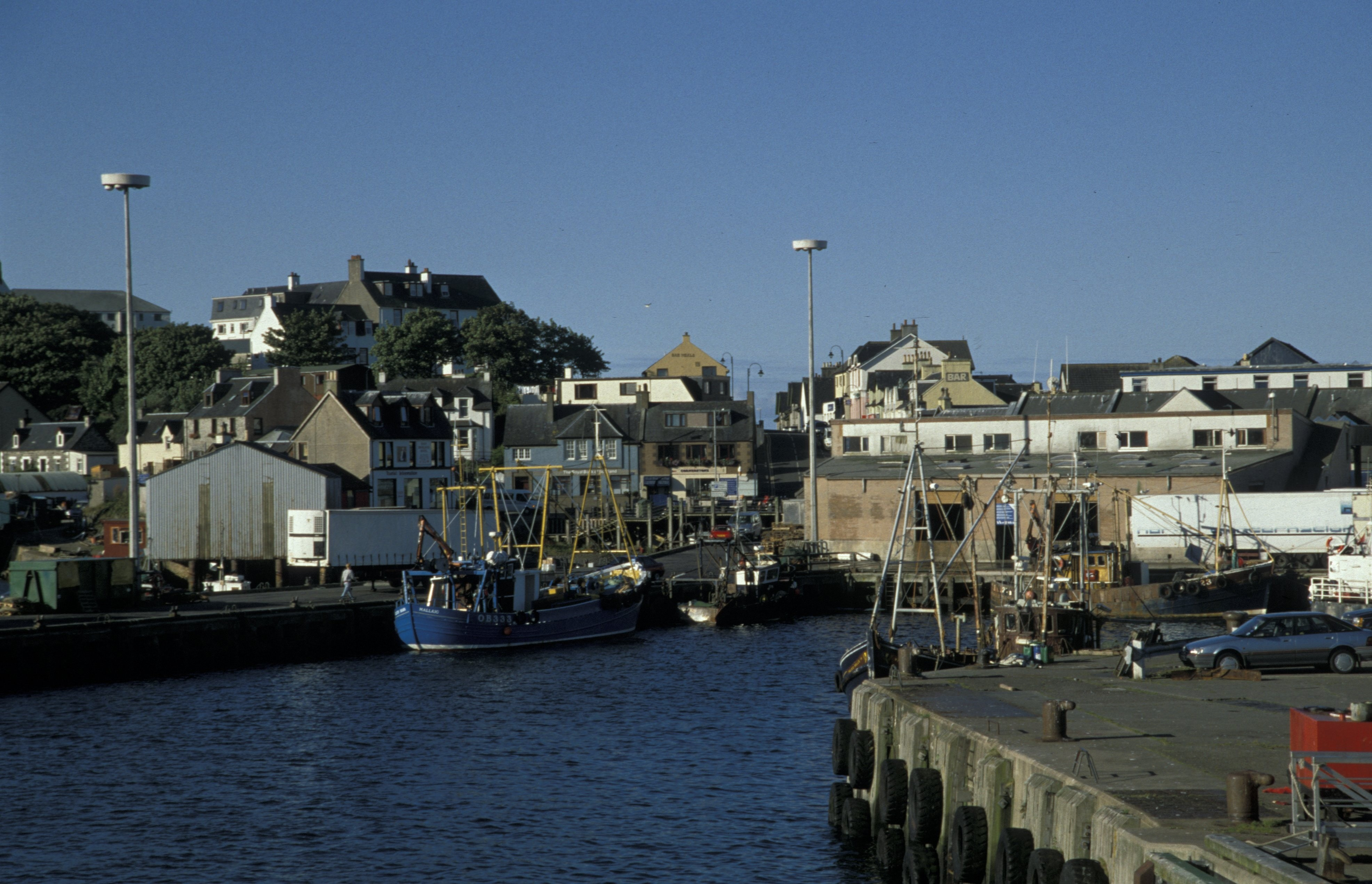
Mallaig harbour from the ferry to the Isle of Skye

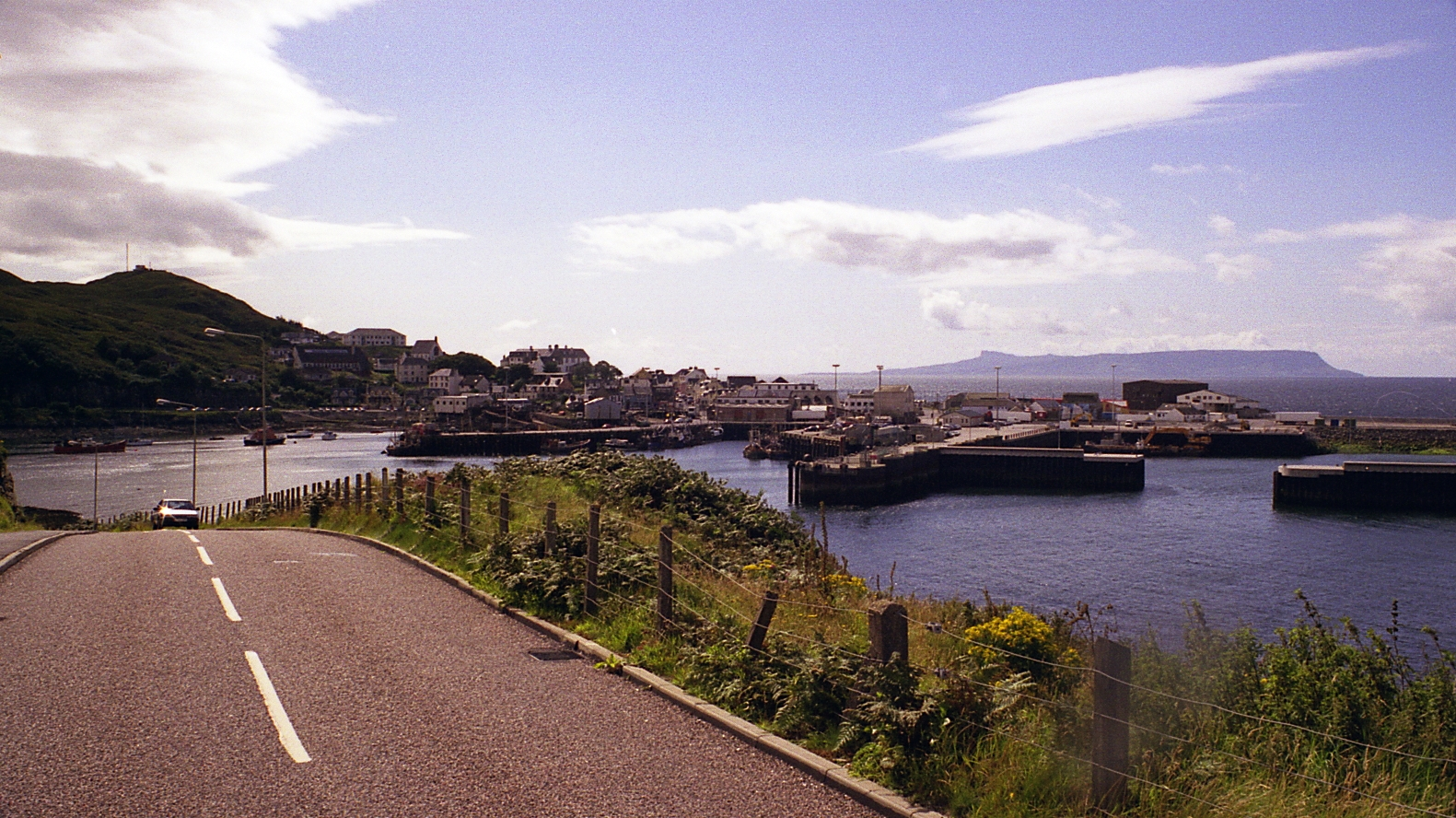
Mallaig viewed from the Ferry Road to the north of the village

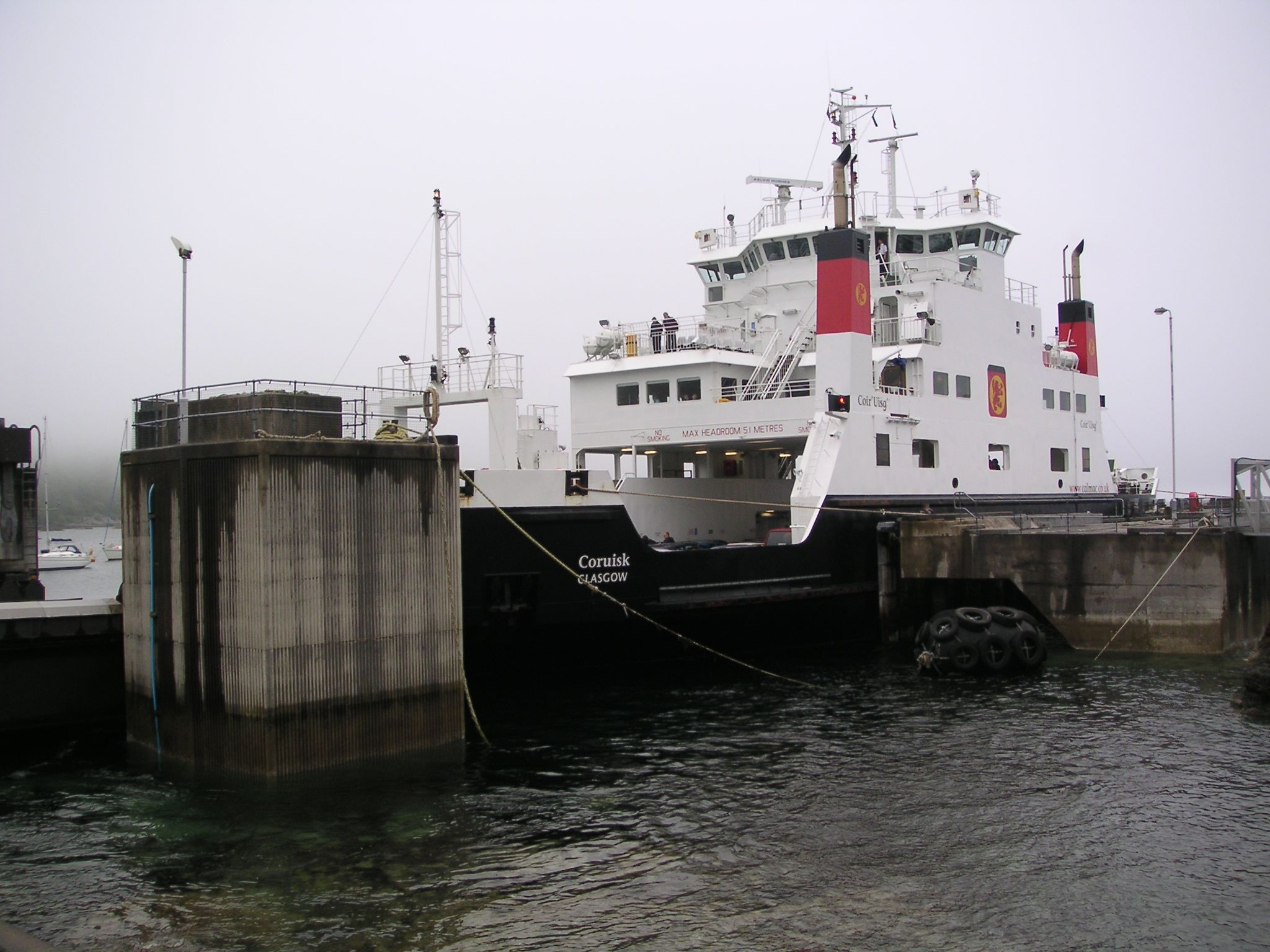
The Mallaig to Armadale car ferry

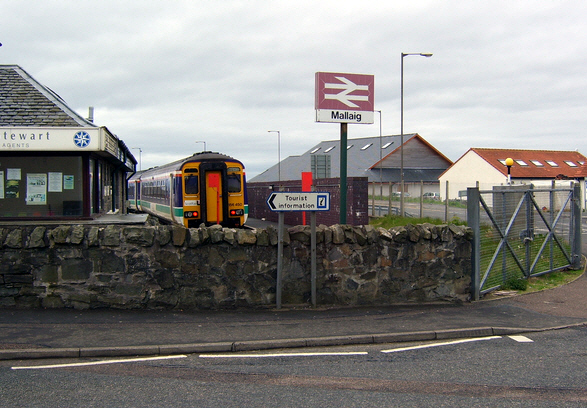
Mallaig railway station

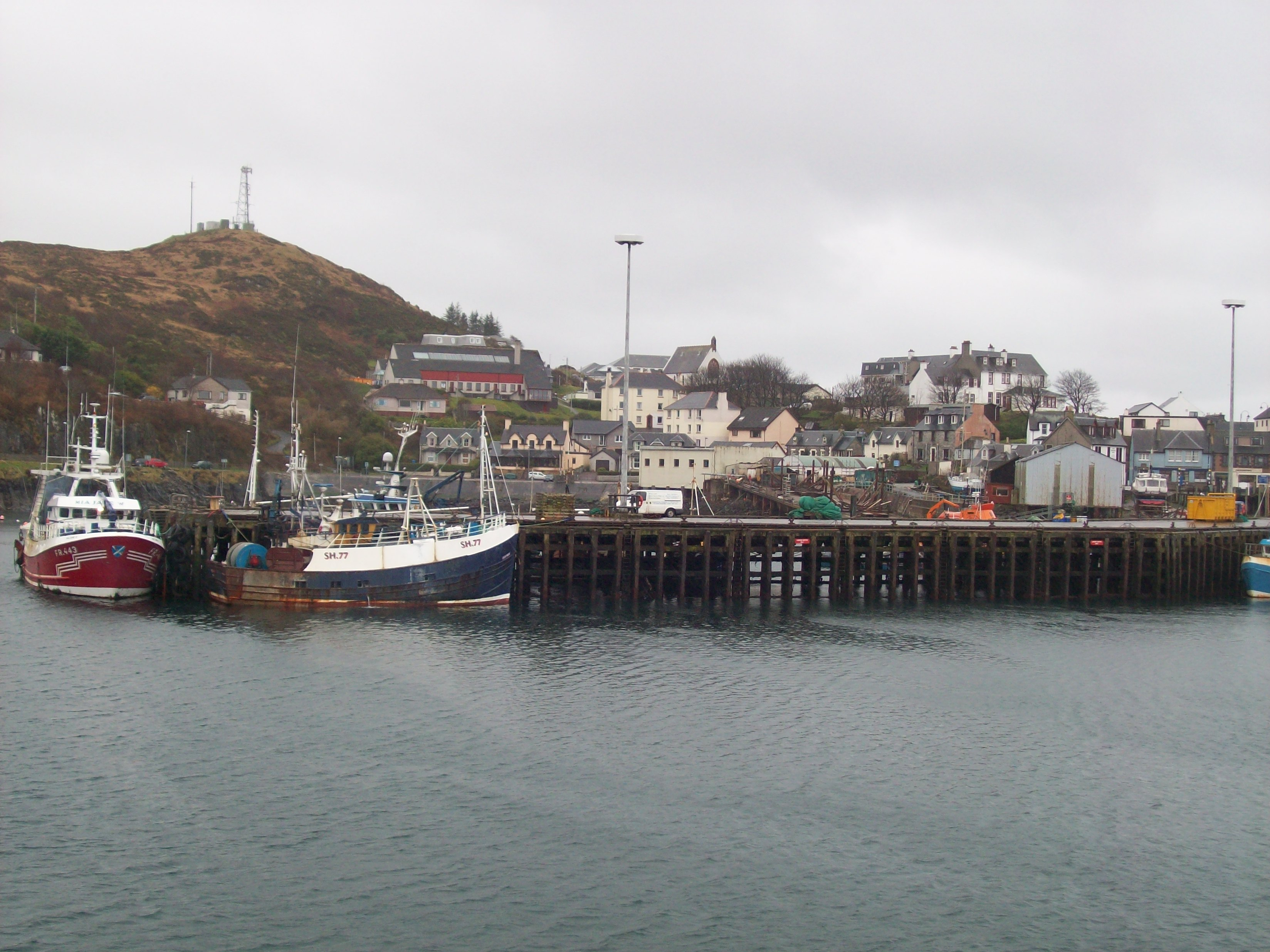
Mallaig harbour

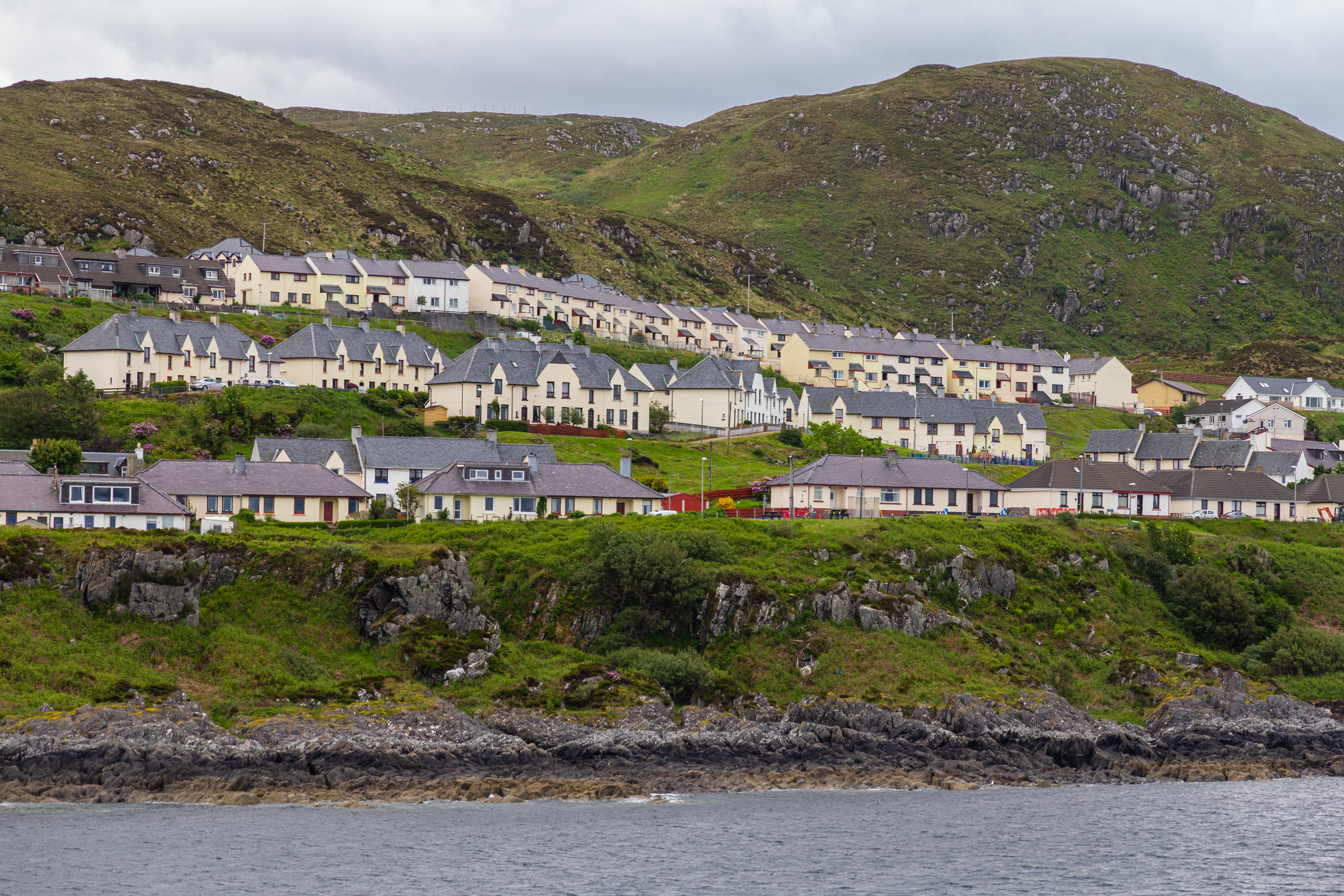
Council Houses in Mallaig

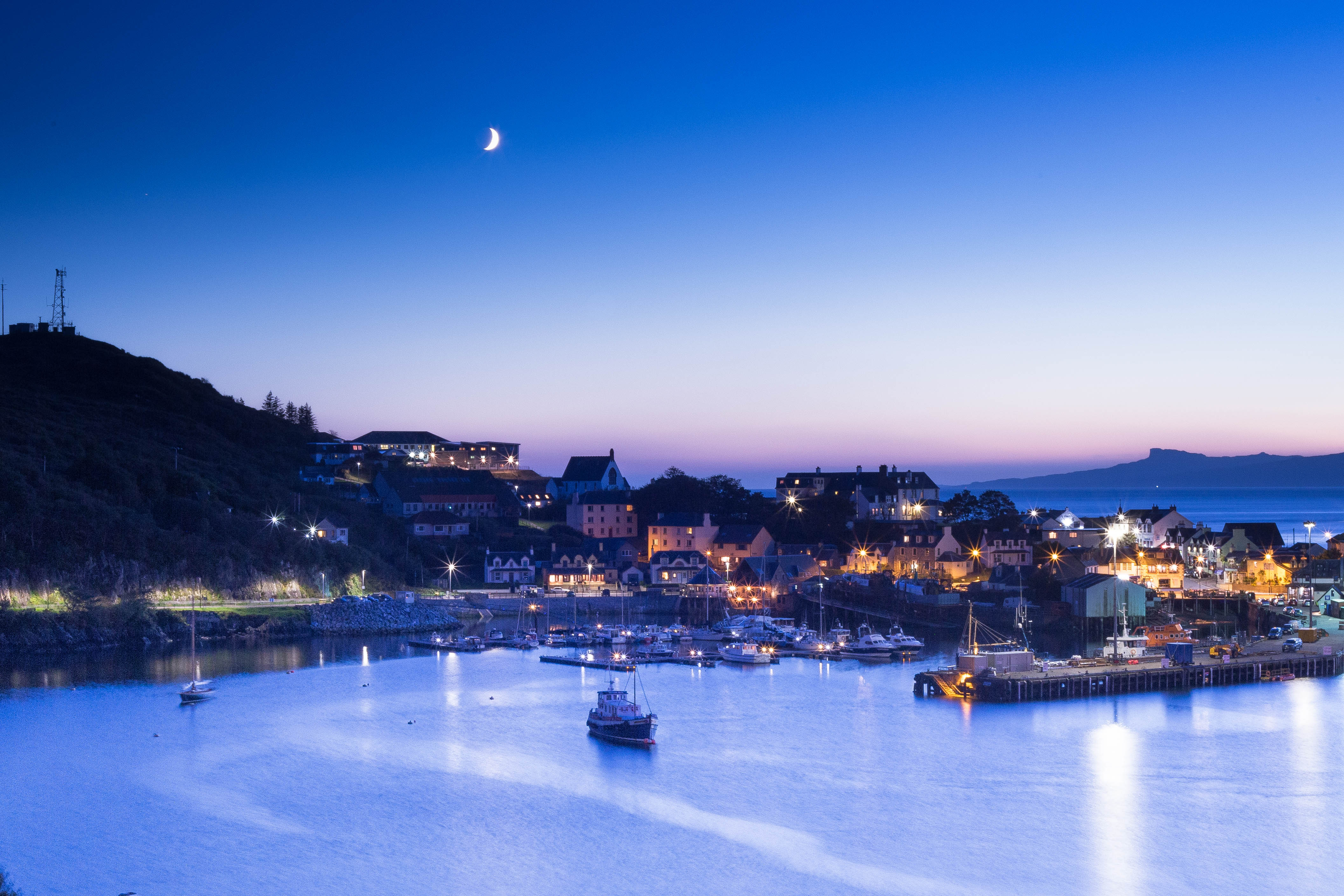
Mallaig from the hill above East Bay under an autumn moon
