= Kellas, Angus =

Coordinates: 56.507502°N 2.885453°W

Kellas
- Location within Angus Location near the Dundee City council area
- OS grid reference: NO456354
- Council area: Angus
- Lieutenancy area: Angus
- Country: Scotland
- Sovereign state: United Kingdom
- Post town: DUNDEE
- Postcode district: DD5
- Dialling code: 01382
- Police: Scotland
- Fire: Scottish
- Ambulance: Scottish
- UK Parliament: Dundee East
- Scottish Parliament: Angus North East Scotland

Kellas is a village in Angus, Scotland. It lies approximately two miles north of Dundee, on the B978 road.

== Bus Services ==
Bus operator Moffat & Williamson runs services 78 & 79 which serve Kellas on the way to Monifieth, Broughty Ferry and Dundee.

Additionally, on Tuesdays and Thursdays, Service 181A operates, linking Carnoustie and Forfar with several towns, including Kellas and Wellbank. The service is run by JP Minicoaches.

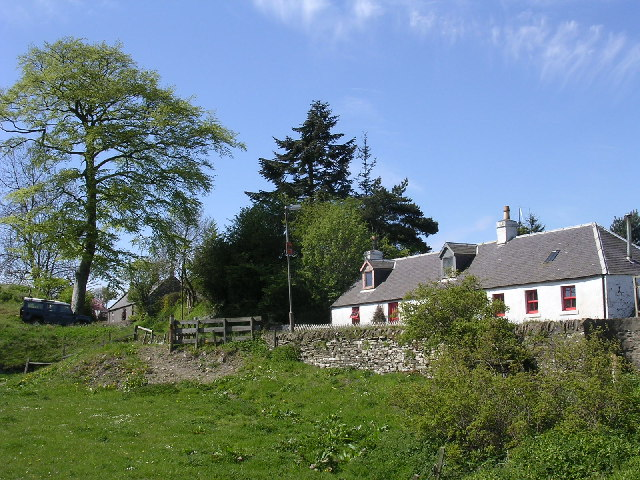
Kellas
