= Newbigging, Angus =

Coordinates: 56.514°N 2.817°W

Newbigging
- Location within Angus
- OS grid reference: NO498361
- Council area: Angus
- Lieutenancy area: Angus
- Country: Scotland
- Sovereign state: United Kingdom
- Post town: DUNDEE
- Postcode district: DD5
- Dialling code: 01382
- Police: Scotland
- Fire: Scottish
- Ambulance: Scottish
- UK Parliament: Dundee East
- Scottish Parliament: Angus South

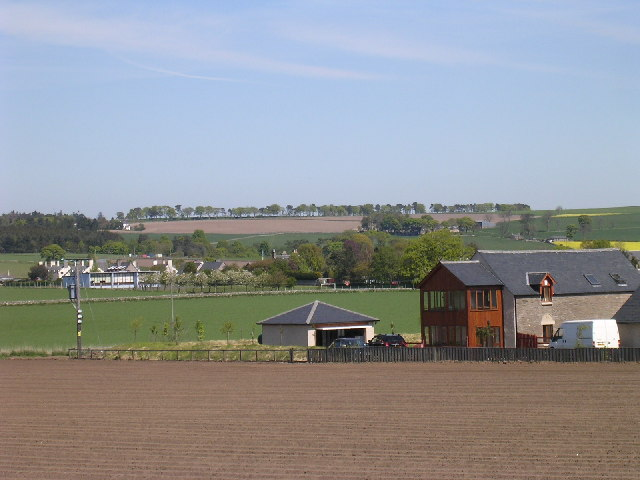
Looking north-east from Drumsturdy to Newbigging

Newbigging is a village in Angus, Scotland, two miles (three kilometres) northeast of Dundee. The name "Newbigging" originally referred to a "new bigging" or "new cottar town" (hamlet). The village is roughly two miles (three kilometres) north of Monifieth.

Some of the earliest history of the local area is represented approximately four kilometres northwest at the village of Eassie, where the Eassie Stone is displayed in a ruined church; this carved Pictish stone is dated prior to the Early Middle Ages.

== Landmarks ==
The oldest buildings in the village (exceeding 200 years), are the village church and the old church manse. The church is almost in the centre of the village, on the main road "Pitairlie Road". The church had been bought by artist Nail Hanna and then sold onto a private buyer who has converted it into a house. The old manse, which was superseded by the new manse behind the church (neither of which are used as the church manse any more), was given the dwelling name of "Davidsons Cottage". While this name is in some databases as the name of the oldest house in Newbigging, its current monicker is "Rhodd Duw", which is Welsh for God's gift due to the circumstances of its acquisition.

Newbigging shop, which won best village shop in Scotland in 1997, was also sold to a private buyer and converted into a house. 2005 saw the erection of 20 houses on farmland at Cunmont Cottages, Newbigging. The site, which extends to 2 3/4 acres (1.1 hectares), lies on the northwest sector of Newbigging between Pitairlie Road and the private road to Cunmont.

The fields around Newbigging are used mostly for the growing of arable crops such as wheat and oil seed rape.

== Bus services ==
Moffat & Williamson, a bus operator headquartered in Fife, provides convenient two-hourly bus services connecting Dundee and several other towns, including Monifieth & Broughty Ferry numbered 78 & 79 via Newbigging. Operating on Mondays, Wednesdays & Fridays only is the JP MInicoaches service 181, which connects Muirdrum, Carnoustie and Monifieth and several other towns, including Newbigging and Monikie, with Forfar. The bus route is convenient for shoppers as, along with the town centre, it stops at Asda, Tesco, Lidl & Aldi. It also stops at Monifieth Tesco.

== See also ==
- Monikie
- Wellbank
- Carnoustie
- Monifieth
