= Wellbank =

Coordinates: 56.521°N 2.863°W

- Location within Angus
- Population: 610 (2020)
- OS grid reference: NO470369
- Council area: Angus
- Lieutenancy area: Angus
- Country: Scotland
- Sovereign state: United Kingdom
- Post town: DUNDEE
- Postcode district: DD5
- Dialling code: 01382
- Police: Scotland
- Fire: Scottish
- Ambulance: Scottish
- UK Parliament: Dundee East
- Scottish Parliament: Angus South

Wellbank is a village in Angus, Scotland. It lies approximately three miles north of Dundee, on the B978 road.

== Bus services ==
Based in Fife, the bus operator Moffat & Williamson offers two-hourly bus service 78/79 that link Dundee with various towns, including Wellbank, Monikie, Monifieth and Broughty Ferry. On Tuesdays and Thursdays, service 181A operates, connecting Muirdrum and Forfar with several towns, including Carnoustie, Monifieth, Kellas and Wellbank. Ran by JP Minicoaches.
