= Tayway =

Bus service in Scotland

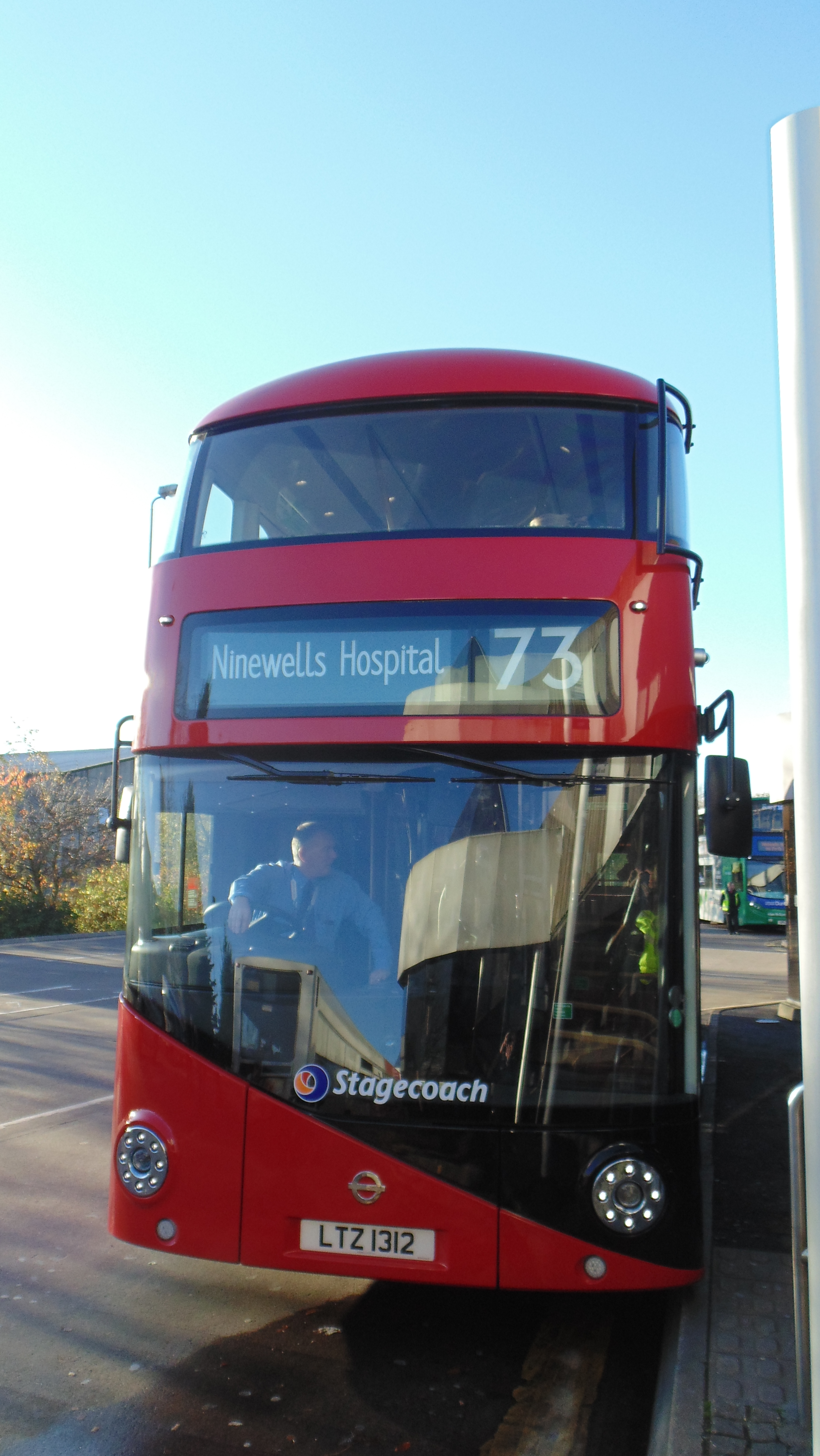
- A New Routemaster bus operating Tayway route 73

Overview
- Area served: Tayside, Scotland
- Locale: Dundee, Broughty Ferry, Monifieth, Carnoustie, Arbroath
- Transit type: Bus, Rail (until 1986)
- Website: Stagecoach Bus

Operation
- Began operation: November 1980
- Operators: Tayside Regional Council (1980–86); Northern Scottish (1980–86); British Rail (1980–86); Strathtay Scottish (1986–2005); Stagecoach Strathtay (2005–present)

Tayway is a bus (and previously rail) service between Dundee and Arbroath in Scotland. The service started in November 1980 and was operated jointly by Tayside Regional Council, Northern Scottish and British Rail. It included an integrated timetable and fare system, meaning that tickets could be used on all three operators. The brand is now used for Stagecoach South Scotland.

== Original service ==
A partnership was formed in 1980 between Tayside Regional Council, Northern Scottish and British Rail whereby fares would be standardised and details of all services would be published in a shared timetable. The buses and trains operating on the route were given Tayway branding, including British Rail's fleet of 5 Class 122s and Tayside Regional Council's fleet of 26 Daimler Fleetlines. The arrangement came to an end in 1986 due to bus deregulation in the United Kingdom and the bus services were taken over by Strathtay Scottish, who used a fleet of AEC Routemasters on the route.

== Current use ==
Strathtay Scottish were bought by Stagecoach Group in 2005, who continued to use the Tayway brand for their service 73: Ninewells Hospital to Arbroath.

The route was notable for being the only bus route in the UK (outside of London) to retain bus conductors, known locally as clippies. Conductors were found on most bus services in the area until the 1980s, when most buses became pay-on-entry, minimising the need for a second staff member on board. Conductors speed up journey times, minimising dwell time at bus stops en-route as the driver does not need to issue fares. However, conductor-operation on the route was stopped in March 2020 as a result of the Coronavirus pandemic, and it was later announced that conductors would not return to the route.

In November 2014, Stagecoach announced a three-month trial of two New Routemaster buses. The trial was unsuccessful, with buses frequently breaking down, causing substantial delays.

The route was then operated with 16 diesel double-decker Alexander Dennis Enviro400 MMC buses built by Alexander Dennis in Falkirk.

In the summer of 2025, 16 brand new Alexander Dennis Enviro400EVs electric double decker's soon replaced their predecessors, with 7 new Volvo BZL's joining later.

In late 2024 to early 2025, the bus timetable was updated with services 72, 73/A/B/C, and 74/A/B/C between Ninewells Hospital (Note: Served by most 73, 73A, 73B, 73C and 74 services only.), West End (Hawkhill), Dundee City Centre, Broughty Ferry, Monifieth (Note: Monifieth is served by all the services. Ethiebeaton, Ashludie and Broomhill are served by services 74, 74A, 74B and 74C.), Carnoustie (Note: Carnoustie is served by the 73, 73A, 73B, 73C and 74. Greenlaw Park and the Westhaven area are served by services 73C and 74, Shanwell Rd/Carnoustie High School are served by services 73B and 73C), and Arbroath (Note: Served by the 73, 73A, 73B and occasionally by the 73C.).

The timetable changed again on 28th September 2026.

- Service 72 - the daytime timetable was adjusted, the service no longer stopping at Dundee Bus Station.
- Service 73/A/B/C - 73A, 73B, & 73C was replaced with a revised 73, which runs on a 15-minute timetable from Dundee City Centre to Carnoustie. One of the four hourly journeys from Ninewells Hospital to Arbroath.
- Service 74/A/B/C - 74, 74A & 74C was replaced with a revised service 74 which acts as a link between Moniefieth & Carnoustie. The 74B will continue with an adjusted timetable which serves Dundee to Ethiebeaton Park nightly.
