= William Fisher Cassie =

British civil engineer and academic

Prof William Fisher Cassie (usually referred to simply as Fisher Cassie in his field and as Bill Cassie by his friends) FRSE CBE LLD (1905 – 1985) was a British civil engineer and academic. He was a noteworthy author on building structure. He was an expert on soil mechanics and a strong advocate of underground transport systems.

== Life ==
He was born in Monifieth in Angus on 29 June 1905, the son of William Cassie.

His early education was at the Grove Academy in Dundee. He then studied engineering at the University of St Andrews, graduating in 1925. He continued as a postgraduate, earning a PhD in 1930 before spending a year in the USA in Illinois.

From 1943 until 1970, he was Professor of Civil Engineering at Durham University. In 1965, he was appointed Deputy Chairman of the Advisory Council on Road Research under Prof F.E.Jones. Dundee University awarded him an honorary doctorate in 1972 (LLD).

Cassie was also a noted collector of the traditional dances of Northeast England and the Rapper Sword tradition in particular. He was instrumental in starting Newcastle Kingsmen Sword Team in 1949 who continue to be associated with Newcastle University. His archive of dance notations were gifted to the Morris Ring in his later life.

He died on 20 April 1985.

== Publications ==
- The Torsional Stiffness of Structural Sections (1948)
- Structural Analysis (1954)
- Northumbria: A Selection of Photographs (1958) (foreword only)
- Structure in Building (1966)
- Fundamental Foundations (1968)

== Family ==
He married Mary Robertson Reid in 1933. They had no children.

== Recognition ==
The Cassie Building in Newcastle University is named after him.

His portrait is held by the National Portrait Gallery, London.
