= Tayport Castle =

Location
- Coordinates: 56.45082600°N 2.88316060°W

Tayport Castle, was a Z plan castle that was located near Tayport, Fife, Scotland. The castle was demolished in the 19th century and no remains above ground are visible.
