= Broughty Ferry =

Suburb of Dundee, Scotland

Coordinates: 56.46718°N 2.86991°W

Broughty Ferry: Scottish Gaelic: Bruach Tatha; Scots: Brochtie or Brochty; The Ferry
- Town, suburb and former burgh
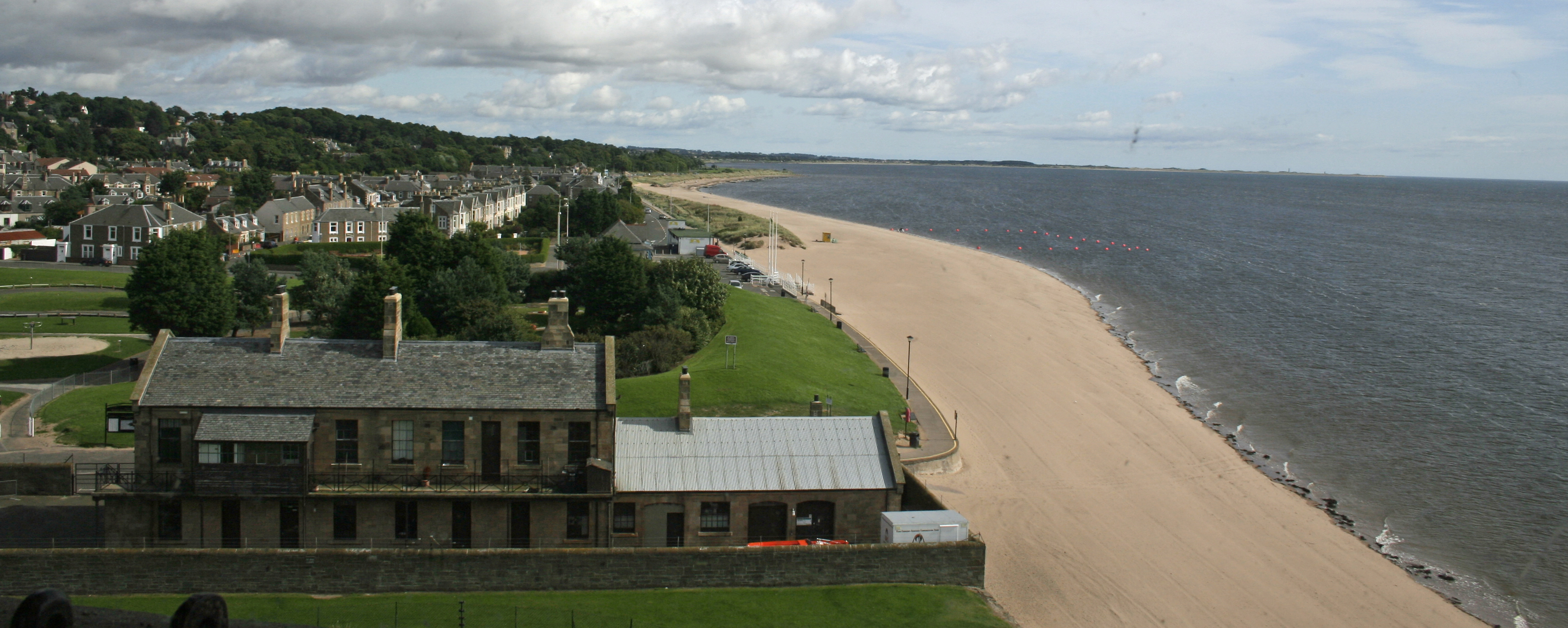
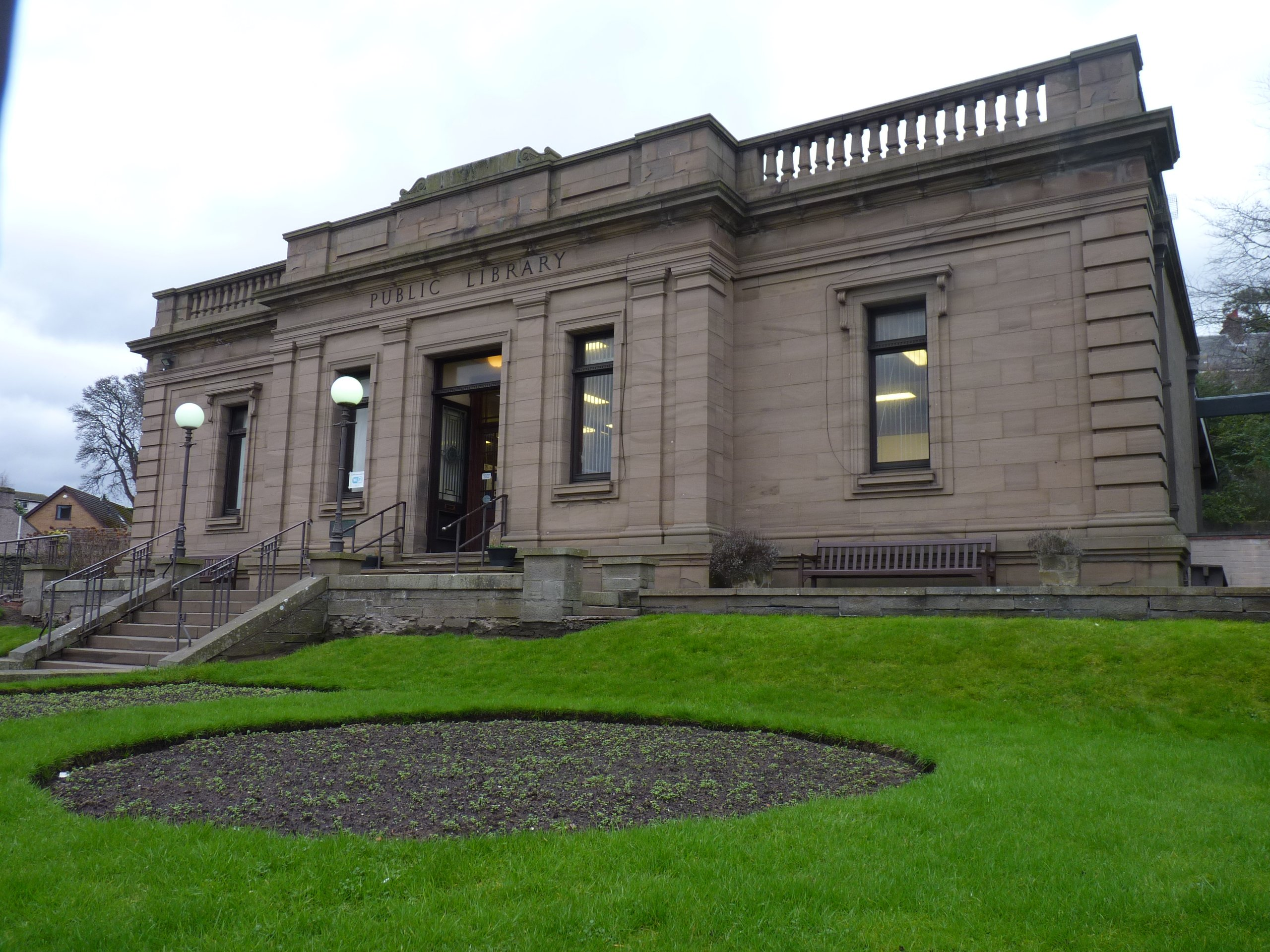
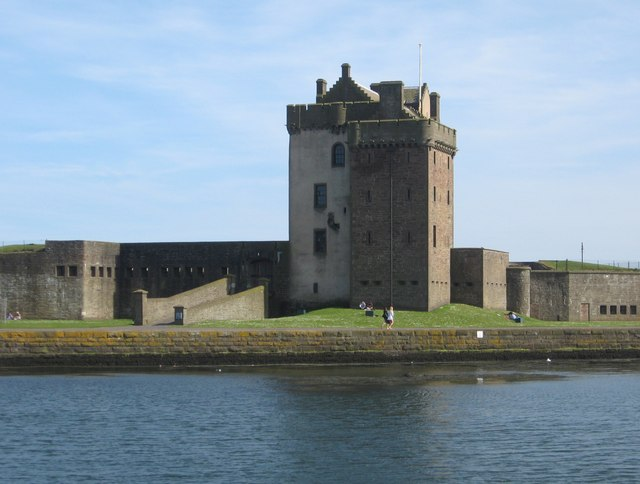
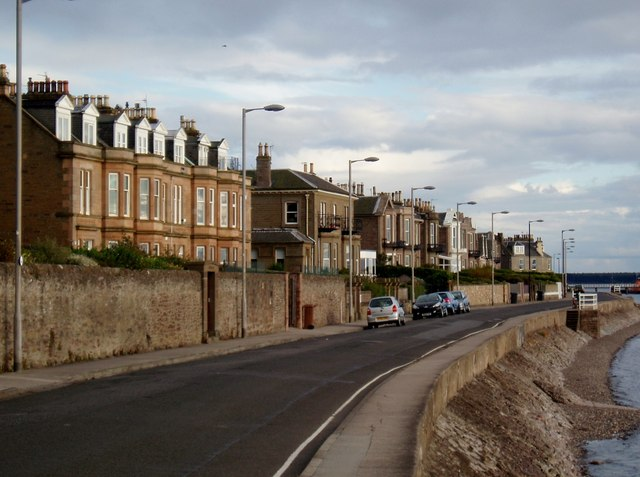
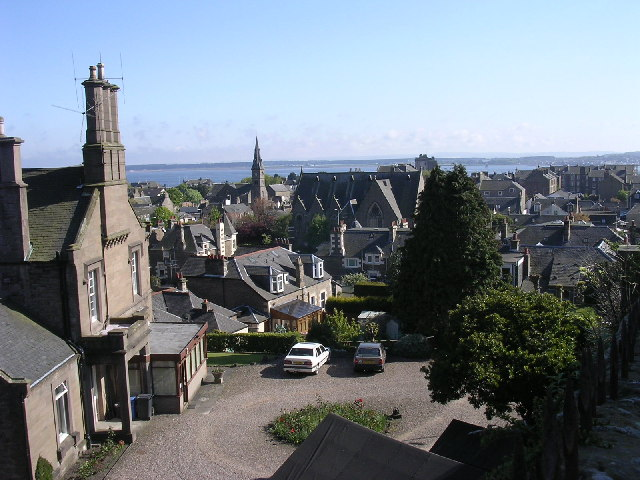
- Clockwise from top: Broughty Ferry Beach; Broughty Castle; Looking south from Camphill Road; Douglas Terrace; Broughty Ferry Library

- Location within Dundee City council area Location within Scotland
- Area: 10.5 km^{2} (4.1 sq mi)
- Population: 20,038 (2020)
  - Density: 1,908/km^{2} (4,940/sq mi)
- OS grid reference: NO465309
- Council area: Dundee City
- Lieutenancy area: Dundee
- Country: Scotland
- Sovereign state: United Kingdom
- Areas: List: Balgillo; Central Broughty Ferry; Barnhill; Forthill; West Ferry
- Post town: DUNDEE
- Postcode district: DD5
- Dialling code: 01382
- Police: Scotland
- Fire: Scottish
- Ambulance: Scottish
- UK Parliament: Arbroath and Broughty Ferry
- Scottish Parliament: Dundee City East

Broughty Ferry (/ˈbrɒti/; Scottish Gaelic: Bruach Tatha; Scots: Brochtie) is a suburb in Dundee, Scotland. It is situated four miles east of the city centre on the north bank of the Firth of Tay. The area was a separate burgh from 1864 until 1913, when it was incorporated into Dundee. Historically, it is within the County of Angus.

Formerly a prosperous fishing and whaling village, in the 19th century Broughty Ferry became a haven for wealthy jute barons, who built their luxury villas in the suburb. As a result, Broughty Ferry was referred to at the time as the "richest square mile in Europe".

It is administered as part of the Dundee City council area. At a national level, it is represented by both the UK Parliamentary constituency of Arbroath and Broughty Ferry and the Scottish Parliamentary constituency of Dundee City East.

Several road and rail routes are located within the area; Broughty Ferry railway station is situated in the centre of the suburb, and the A930 road skirts its main retail area. Broughty Ferry is also linked by several bus routes to its neighbouring suburbs and to central Dundee.

== Toponymy ==
The name Broughty may derive from Bruach Tatha meaning "Taybank" in Scottish Gaelic. A piece of folk etymology holds that the name derives from the Lowland Scots broch, meaning some form of fortification, with the 'ty' being a shortening of the name of the River Tay, and Ferry being added later in recognition of the town's role as a ferry port. However, this is unlikely, as the word order would probably be "Tay Broch", rather than "Broch Tay". However various Robert and James Gordon maps around 1636-52 suggests otherwise with the name showing as 'Brochtie' and 'Bruchtie'. The Timothy Pont of 1583-1614 has it listed as 'Brugh-Tay'.

The suffix "Ferry" was applied at the introduction of a regular ferry crossing in the 19th century, crossing to Fife, but the name endured beyond the closure of the ferry and did not revert to its previous form of simply "Broughty".

== History ==
Broughty Castle, 2011

Evidence exists of a human settlement in pre-historic times, later developing into a prosperous fishing and whaling village, before becoming home to 19th-century jute barons who had their factories in Dundee. At this time, it was known as the 'richest square mile in Europe'.

Broughty Castle was built in 1495, and remained in use as a major defensive structure until 1932, playing a role in the Anglo-Scottish Wars and the Wars of the Three Kingdoms. The castle stands on a shallow tip projecting into the Firth, alongside two beaches, one of sand, the other of pebbles

Additionally, an English fort was located on what is now known as Forthill. Fortified around 1548 and demolished in 1550, no trace of this now survives due to the development of later buildings and gardens. However it was recorded in 1845 that less than 60 years earlier some of the walls still stood. The castle was bought by the government and restored during 1860–1861.

The area has two Category A listed churches, St Stephen's Church (the parish church of West Ferry) and St Luke's Church built in the 19th century. St Stephen's has exceptionally fine Victorian windows thought to be the best collection of Edward Burne-Jones stained glass in Scotland. Broughty Ferry railway station is also A-listed, and the buildings from 1838 are still in use, making it the oldest railway station in Scotland still in operation.

Prior to the construction of the first Tay Rail Bridge in 1878, a roll-on/roll-off railway ferry linked the Edinburgh to Aberdeen railway line between Tayport and Broughty Ferry, until the construction of the rail bridge made it redundant.

Broughty Ferry was incorporated into the City of Dundee in 1913.

On 2 December 1943, a pigeon from Broughty Ferry called Winkie was awarded the Dickin Medal for "delivering a message under exceptional difficulties and so contributing to the rescue of an Air Crew while serving with the RAF in February 1942".

On 8 December 1959, the suburb's lifeboat, the RNLB Mona, was lost with all hands, whilst attempting to rescue a foundering lightship.

== Balgillo ==
Balgillo is a housing development in Broughty Ferry. It is bounded by Balgillo Road to the south, the A92 Dundee to Arbroath dual carriageway to the north, Balgillo Road East to the west, and Panmurefield Village to the east.

== Architecture ==
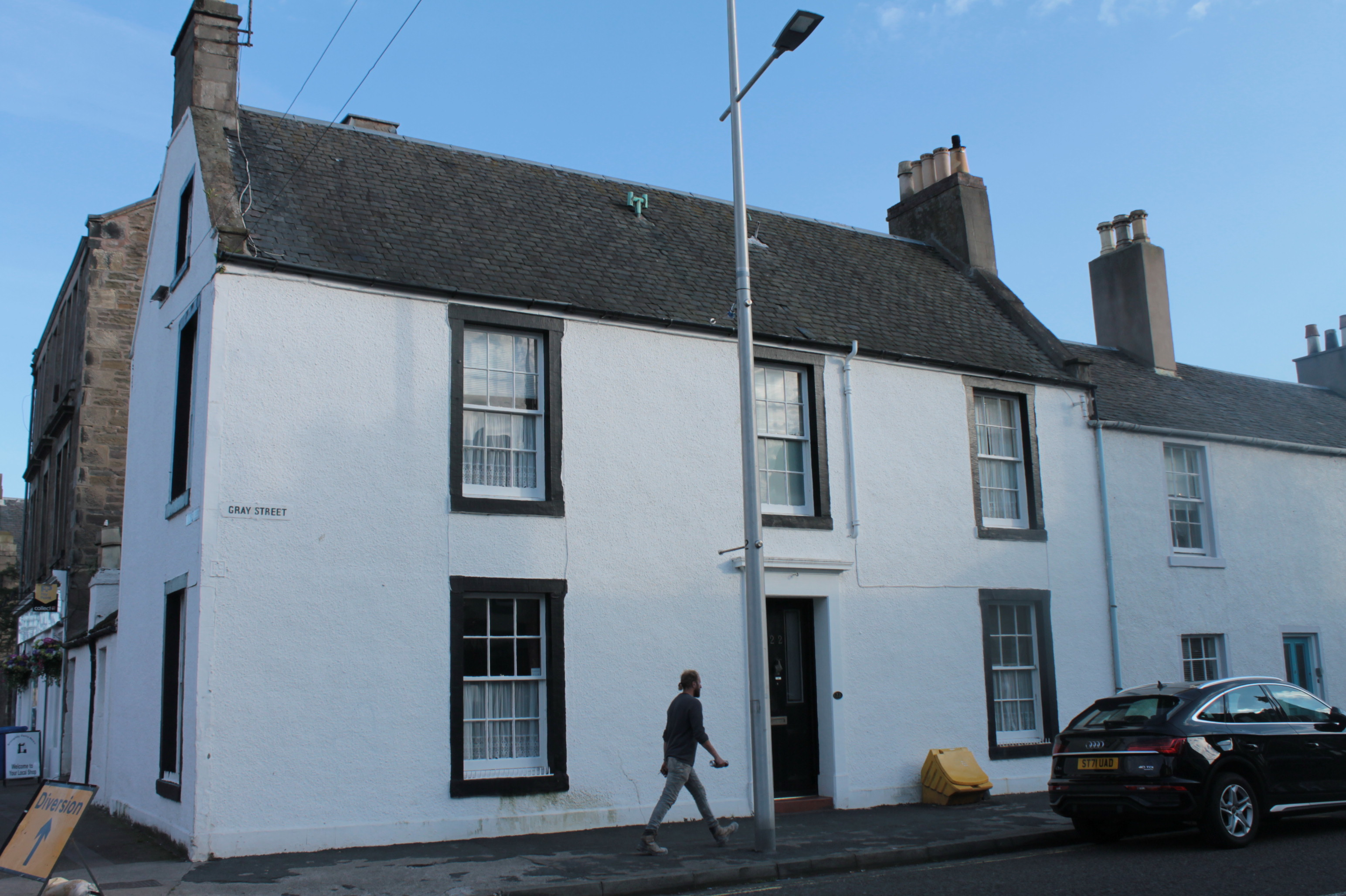
18th c house, Gray Street, Broughty Ferry

A small village existed from the 15th century. Some of the original one and two storey houses from the 18th century survive, close to the harbour. At the beginning of the 19th century, Charles Hunter drew up plans on a gridiron layout and the area was greatly expanded in size. This gridiron plan and its 19th century housing survives.

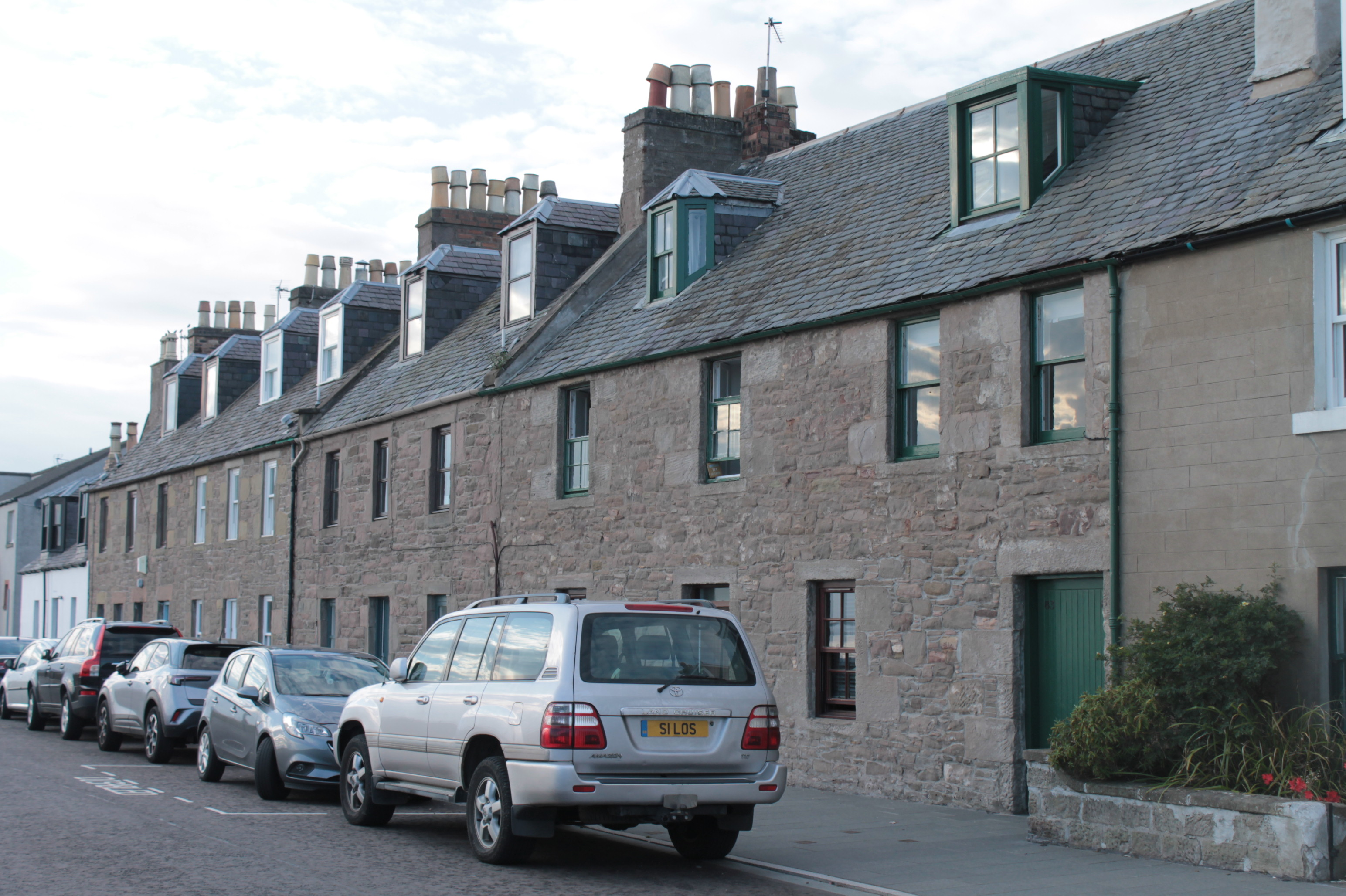
Mid 18th century houses on Fisher Street, Broughty Ferry

In the later 19th century, Dundee built its fame on the three industries of "Jute, Jam & Journalism". The economic drive from these industries - particularly jute - was led by the jute barons. These captains of industry built their mansions and superior villas on the slopes at the 'West End' - above the city of Dundee - and on the raised slopes of Broughty Ferry: the suburb which found itself transformed from fishing village to fashionable "Brighton of the North". In particular, streets such as Hill Street and Camphill Road were subject to construction of opulent mansions such as Castleroy and Carbet Castle, respectively.

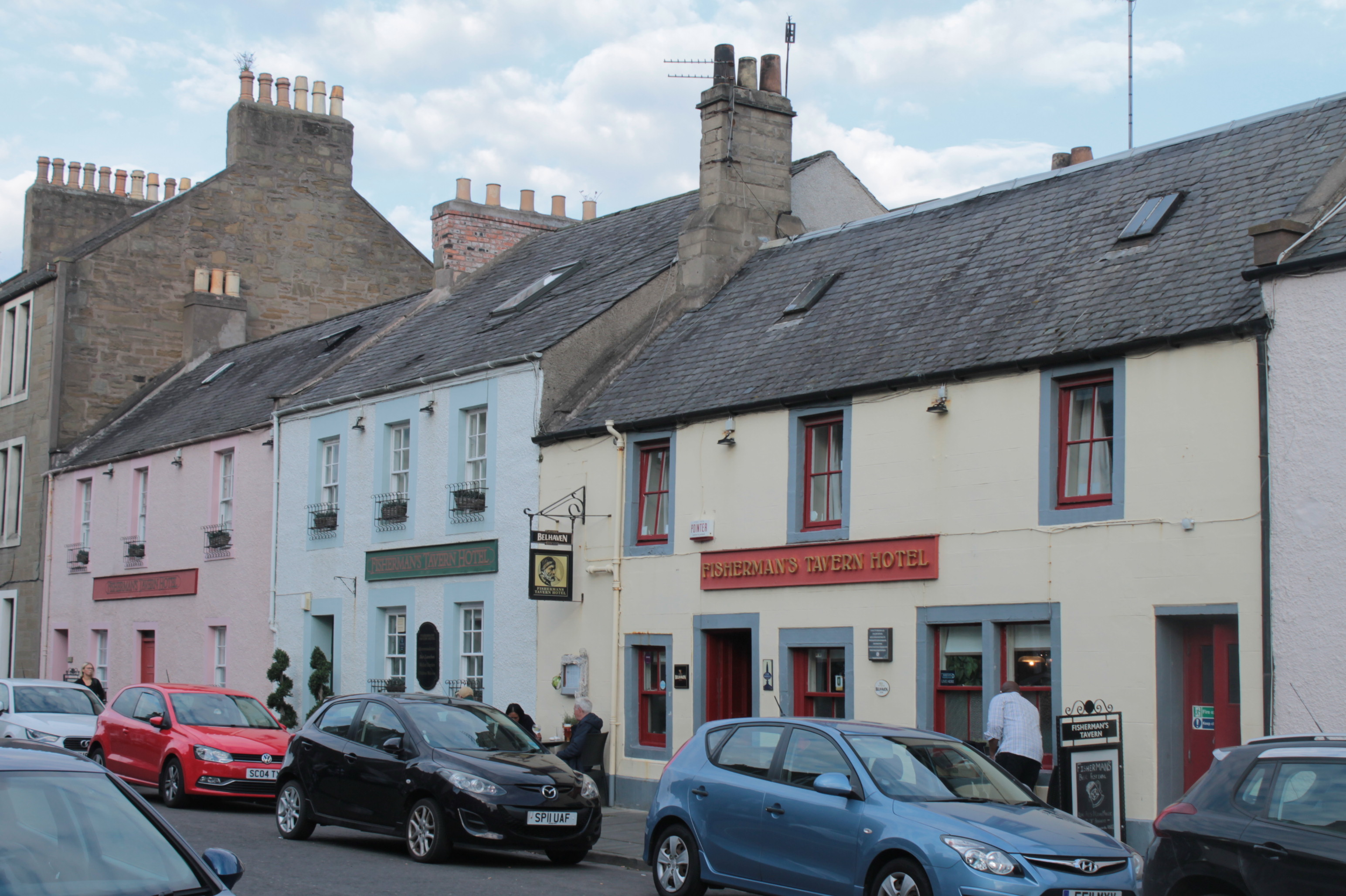
Fisherman's Tavern, Fort Street, Broughty Ferry

In their book "Dundee: an illustrated architectural guide", McKean & Walker describe Broughty Ferry as "once one of the richest suburbs in Europe". "This mid to late-Victorian suburb remains private on its plateau high above the shore: few main roads, minor ones framed by stone walls and mature trees". Dundee architect, Charles Soutar, is reported to have lived at Harecraig House (built 1835) between 1928 and 1947, having designed it as a “dowar house” (residence of a widow). Despite "one of the best views in the Ferry, right across the Tay into Fife”, nine bedrooms and B-listing it has come into disrepair. Declining numbers of residents requiring such palatial houses, mean most of these beautiful buildings have, over the years, been converted into hotels and care homes or divided into flats as happened to another of Soutar's designs: Aystree House (26 Victoria Rd, DD5 1BJ). The original owner, Colonel Smith, was clearly an influential director of the High School of Dundee as one of their four houses is named Aystree, after his house. It is said that "the Liberty of London wood panelling in the entrance hall looks as impressive today as it would have done when the Edwardian mansion was built" over a century ago in 1903; Soutar clearly had a loose budget on this project.

== Education ==
There are three primary schools in Broughty Ferry: Eastern Primary School, Forthill Primary School and Barnhill Primary School.

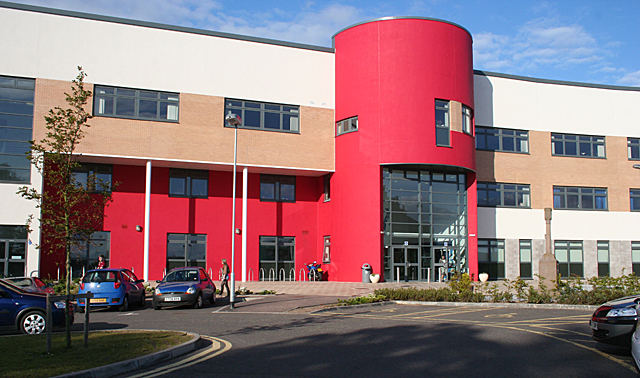
Grove Academy

Eastern Primary School's original, grand Victorian building on purpose-built site at the foot of Whinnie Brae was converted to flats in 2009. The primary school children are now taught within the old Grove building. Grove Academy (high school) was rebuilt; the new building opened in 2009 to accommodate its very large intake - the primary schools are feeder schools for Grove Academy; formerly, pupils who live in the Barnhill area had the option to attend the Angus school, Monifieth High School, although the option was later withdrawn, on 1 January 2009.

== Facilities ==
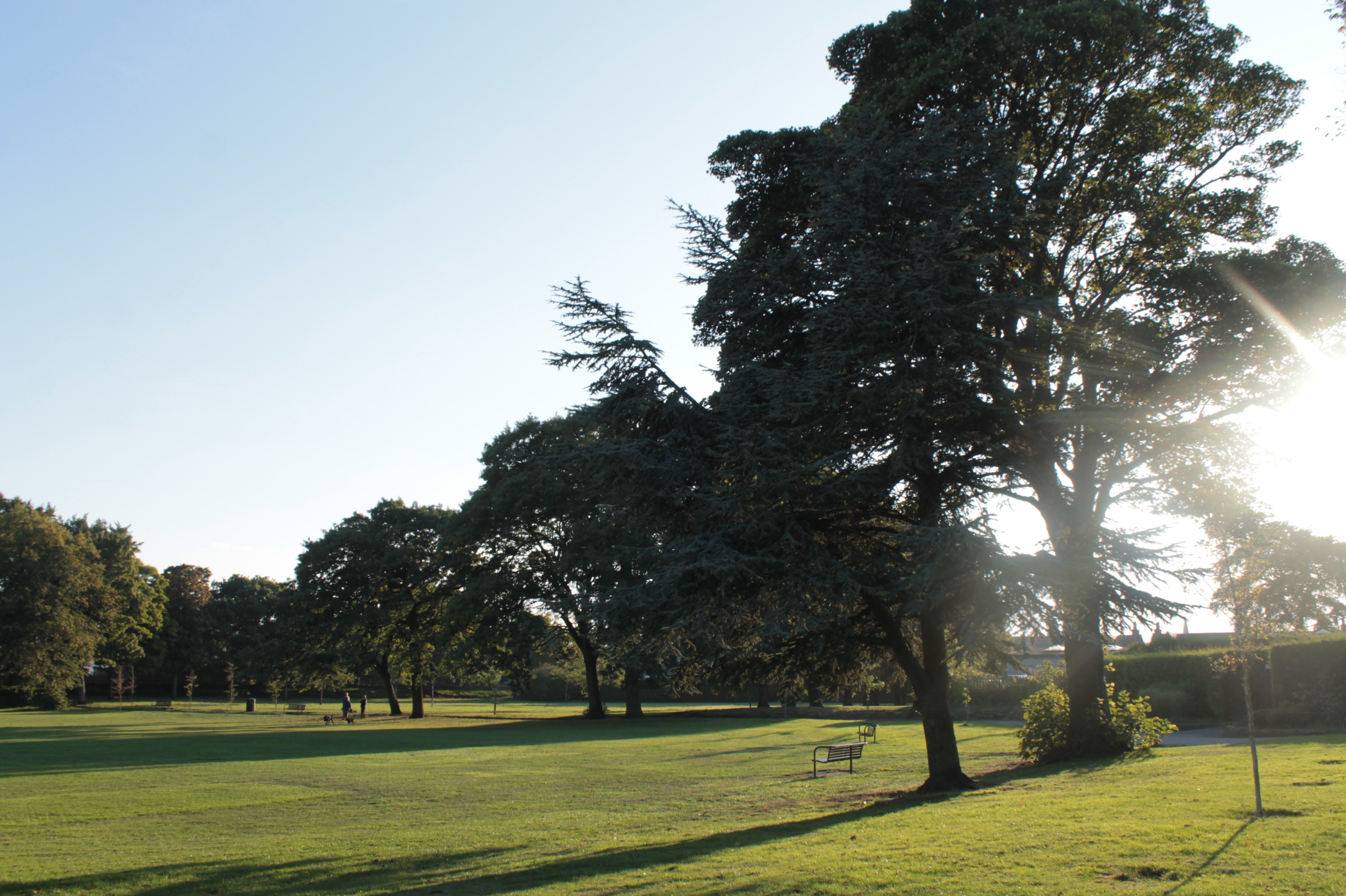
Orchar Park

Broughty Ferry continues to be a popular destination and benefits from a large degree of free parking by the beachfront. The sandy blue flag beach (FEE, Foundation for Environmental Education) maintains the bathing water quality (Scottish Environment Protection Agency). It is staffed by lifeguards during summer months, attracting large crowds. Dolphins can often be seen in the Tay from the beach. Also at the beachfront, is the Castle Green park.

The harbour, sheltered by Broughty Castle is home to Scotland's oldest and most popular "New Year's Dook"; the tradition of swimming between the piers on New Year's Day to mark the new year.

A limited, but increasingly more popular service stops at the railway station. with easy links to Dundee and Edinburgh, or northwards to Arbroath, Carnoustie and Aberdeen.

== Culture ==
=== New Year's Day Dook ===
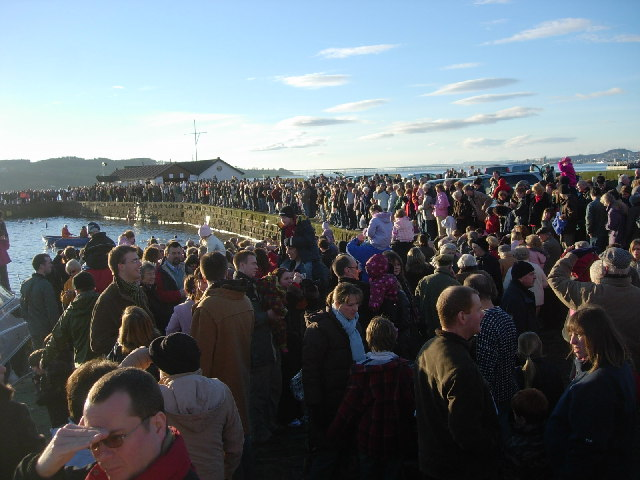
Crowds gather to watch the New Year's Day Dook at the harbour in 2006

The "dook" is an annual event where residents enter the waters of the harbour in fancy dress costumes. A longstanding tradition, it is now organized by Ye Amphibious Ancients Bathing Association (YAABA). Despite often treacherously cold conditions, the Dook has never been cancelled due to the weather; the harbour waters needed to be broken with pick axes in 1989. However, due to the COVID-19 pandemic, the event was cancelled for the first time in 2021, over 130 years after it was first held.

The Dook is the first annual event in Broughty Ferry and Dundee and can boast being the largest in Scotland of the New Year Dooks that take place across eastern Scotland, such as Queensferry's Loony Dook. Participation in the Dook has increased dramatically over the years and now attracts over 300 Dookers to brave the icy cold waters of the harbour in front of around 3,000 spectators.

To celebrate the Millennium a relay team of club members swam from Tayport to Broughty Ferry on 1 January when the temperature that day was 2 °C but has been recorded lower at −3 °C in previous years. The relay was the first ever crossing attempted on a New Year's Day and most of the team could only tolerate the cold water for three minutes at a time. The recorded time for the crossing was 45 minutes.

=== Media ===
The fictional character Bob Servant of the self-named books and BBC radio and television series written by Neil Forsyth is depicted as living in the suburb.

== Politics and government ==
Broughty Ferry is administered as part of the Dundee City council area. The Ferry ward elects four councillors. Derek Scott is the longest seving councillor for the area and therefore is a Baillie, and was appointed such in 2007.

The current councillors for the Ferry Ward are:

Name	First elected	Political Party	FPv%
Craig Duncan	2017	Liberal Democrat	34.7
Kevin Cordell	2012	SNP	20.1
Derek Scott	1990	Conservative	18.5
Pete Shears	2022	Labour	10.0

At a national level, it is represented by both the UK Parliamentary constituency of Arbroath and Broughty Ferry and the Scottish Parliamentary constituency of Dundee City East. In recent elections, Broughty Ferry was within the Dundee East constituency for general elections. After the 2023 Periodic Review of Westminster constituencies, it was moved into the new constituency of Arbroath and Broughty Ferry, which was first contested at the 2024 general election.

The MP who represents the town at Westminster as part of Arbroath and Broughty Ferry is:

Name	First elected	Political Party	Majority
Lara Bird	2026	SNP	5,278

The MSP who represents Broughty Ferry as part of Dundee City East is:

Name	First elected	Political Party	Majority
Stephen Gethins	2026	SNP	13,337

== Sport ==
The majority of sporting activity takes place in Dawson Park, which boasts a number of fields and facilities. The park has five football pitches, a rugby union pitch, an American football pitch, multiple tennis courts and several athletics facilities. Dundee's two professional football teams, Dundee F.C. and Dundee United, occasionally use the pitches to train. In 2006, the new all-weather pitch with floodlights was opened, and is used by the nearby Grove Academy.

The Forthill Community Sports Club has a large site on Fintry Place. The ground was purchased in 1880 by a group of city merchants led by George M. Cox and is now home to:

- Forfarshire Cricket Club
- Panmure Rugby FC
- Forthill Squash Club: three courts
- Forthill Tennis Club: three floodlit artificial clay courts and a playing season between April and October.
- Forthill Padel Club: the newest addition to the sports club, construction of two new enclosed padel courts and one outdoor pickleball court was completed in November 2025

Broughty Ferry's other tennis club, Broughty Ferry Tennis Club, is open all year round and has six all-weather floodlit courts.

Broughty Athletic F.C. play at Whitton Park, Arbroath Road, adjacent to Douglas Sports Centre (opposite Claypotts Castle). The club plays in the ACA Sports East Region Premier League; many opposition teams are based in Fife and the Lothians.

Both of the bowls clubs, Broughty BC and Broughty Castle BC, are open all year round; their outdoor bowling season runs from April to September.

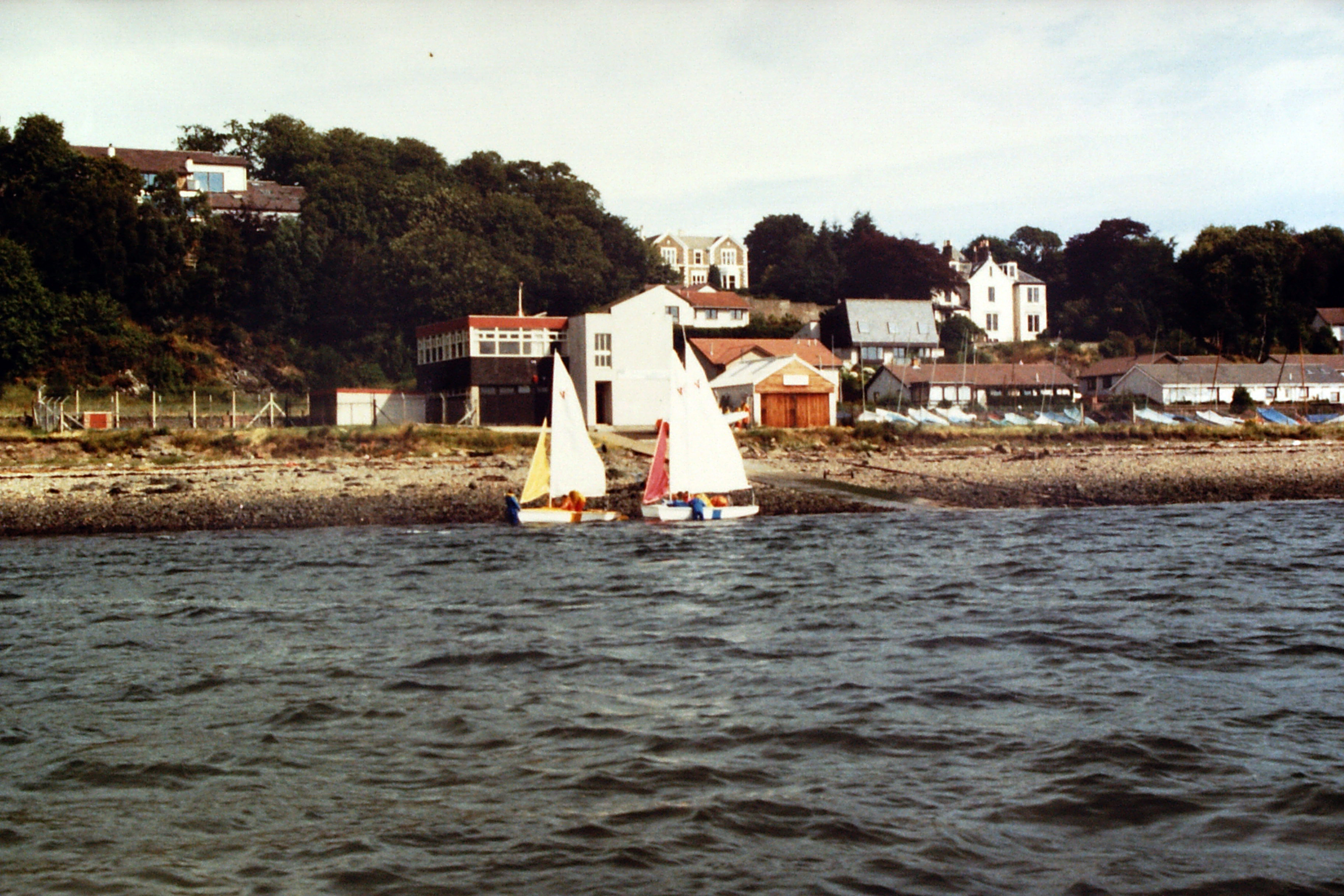
The sailing clubs and boatsheds in 1983

Due to its location on the Tay, Broughty Ferry has a long history of recreational sailing. The Grassy Beach in West Ferry is the centre of most sailing and rowing in Broughty Ferry. The Royal Tay Yacht Club (RTYC) has been based in West Ferry for over 100 years. Broughty Ferry Boating, now a subsidiary of the RTYC, was founded as the Broughty Ferry Boating Club. Dundee University Sailing Club uses the yacht club's facilities.

Dundee Sailing and Rowing Club is also a well-established organisation and has its own facilities at the Grassy Beach.

== Cadet Forces ==
=== Air Training Corps ===
1232 (City of Dundee) Squadron is based in Gardyne Place, Broughty Ferry, next to Craigebarns Primary School. It is a successful, active squadron which benefits from close proximity to RAF Leuchars for basic powered flying training (currently using Grob Tutor), RM Condor (Viking Glider) in Arbroath for winch-launched glider flying and the Barry Buddon Training Area in Monifeith for field exercises and fullbore shooting competitions. The squadron makes use of the small-bore range in Forfar. The active group of cadets parade twice weekly on weekday evenings as well as being successful in a range of weekend competitions and camps across the UK.

=== Army Cadet Force ===
The Army Cadet Force (ACF) is a youth organisation almost 150 years old. Broughty Ferry was formerly home to Grove Black Watch, part of Cambrai company in the Angus and Dundee Battalion. The detachment has since relocated to nearby Monifieth.

== Notable residents ==
Sportspeople that have associations with Broughty Ferry include international footballers Frank Munro and Peter Lorimer, the former Scottish international rugby union captain Sir George Cunningham, and the 1984 Five Nations Grand Slam winner and Rugby World player of the year David Leslie. Musicians with connections to Broughty Ferry include the Average White Band saxophonist Roger Ball, and Gary Clark of the band Danny Wilson. Other notable individuals with connections to Broughty Ferry include the minister and scientist Thomas Dick, the Victoria Cross recipient Hugh Malcolm, the administrator of Elsie Inglis's Scottish Women's Hospitals in Serbia, World War I, suffragist leader of women's civic groups in Dundee, Mary H. J. Henderson, and the Beano/ Dandy cartoonists Dudley D. Watkins and Leo Baxendale. The latter also worked for DC Thomson. From 1955 until around 1964 he lived at 15 Davidson Street. Irish actor Barry Keoghan moved to the suburb in November 2022 with his family.

== Buses ==
There are several buses available from Broughty Ferry, operated by Xplore Dundee, Stagecoach Strathtay, and Moffat & Williamson. These are services 5 and 5A to Barnhill, Dundee and Ninewells Hospital, 10 to Barnhill, Douglas, Whitfield, Fintry, Kirkton, St Marys, Ardler, Lochee and Ninewells Hospital, 73 and 74 to Arbroath, Carnoustie, Monifieth, Dundee and Ninewells Hospital, (Note: 73: Cliffburn - Arbroath - Easthaven - Carnoustie - Barry - Monifieth - Broughty Ferry- Dundee - Ninewells, Mon-Sun 73A: Arbroath - Carnoustie - Monifieth - Broughty Ferry - Dundee - Ninewells, Mon-Sun early mornings and evenings 73B: Arbroath - Muirdrum - Carnoustie - Barry - Monifieth - Broughty Ferry - Dundee - Ninewells, Sun 73C: Carnoustie - Monifieth - Broughty Ferry - Dundee - Ninewells, Mon-Sat 74: Carnoustie - Ethiebeaton Dobbies - Ashludie - Monifieth - Broughty Ferry - Dundee - Ninewells, Sun 74A/74C: Monifieth circular - Broughty Ferry - Dundee - West End 74B: Ethiebeaton Dobbies - Ashludie - Monifieth - Broughty Ferry - Dundee) 78A/C and 79A/C to Dundee, Monifieth, Newbigging, Monikie, Wellbank, Kellas and Ballumbie Castle Estate, 88 to Sainsbury's, Whitfield and Douglas

Panoramic view of Broughty Ferry seen from Dundee Law

== Fishing ==
The statistics maintained by the Fishery Board show the decline in the importance of fishing in Broughty Ferry in the years before the First World War. In 1913 they wrote "Slight increase in catch. Very little fishing carried on".

Fishery Statistics

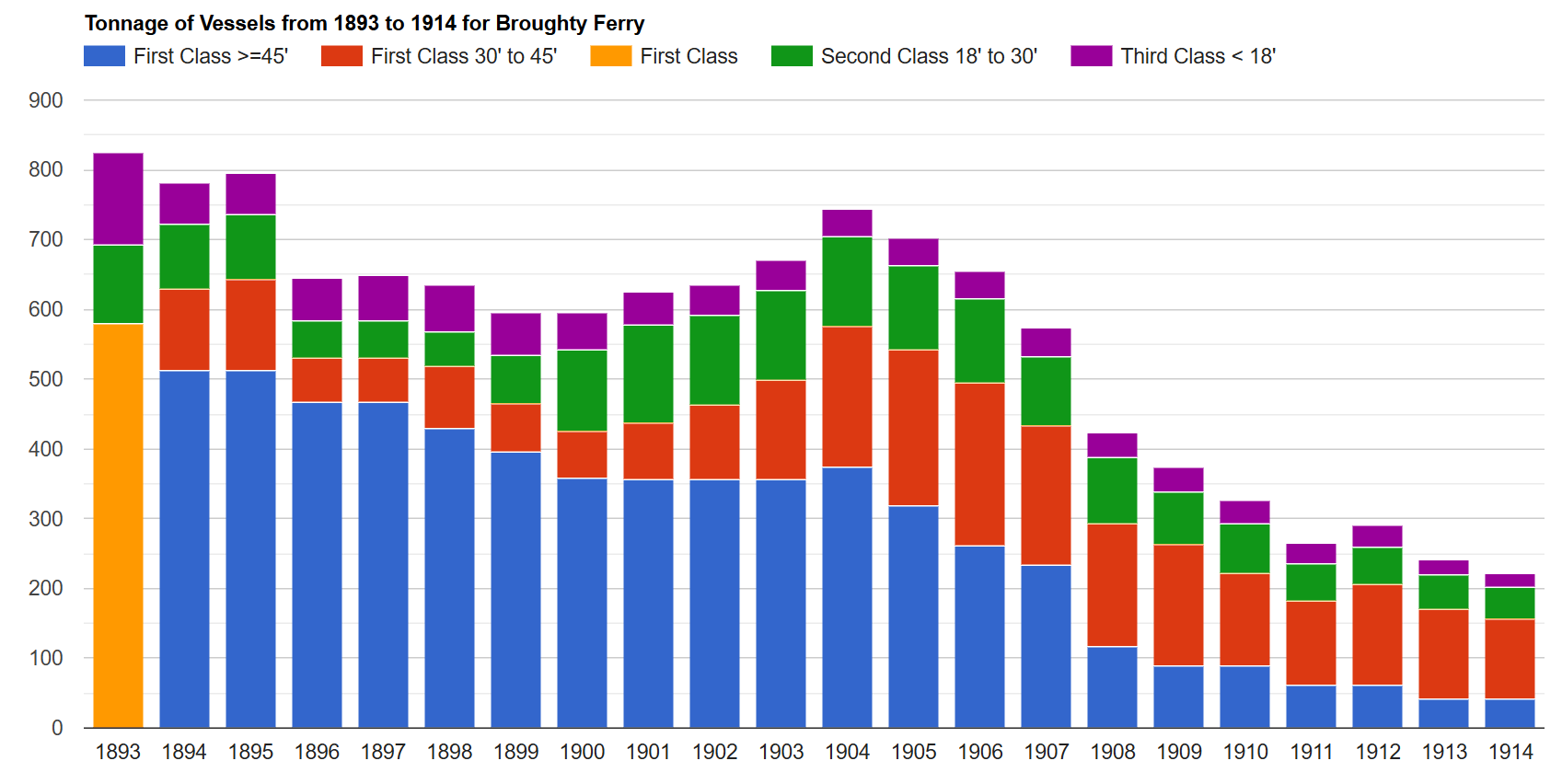
Tonnage of vessels

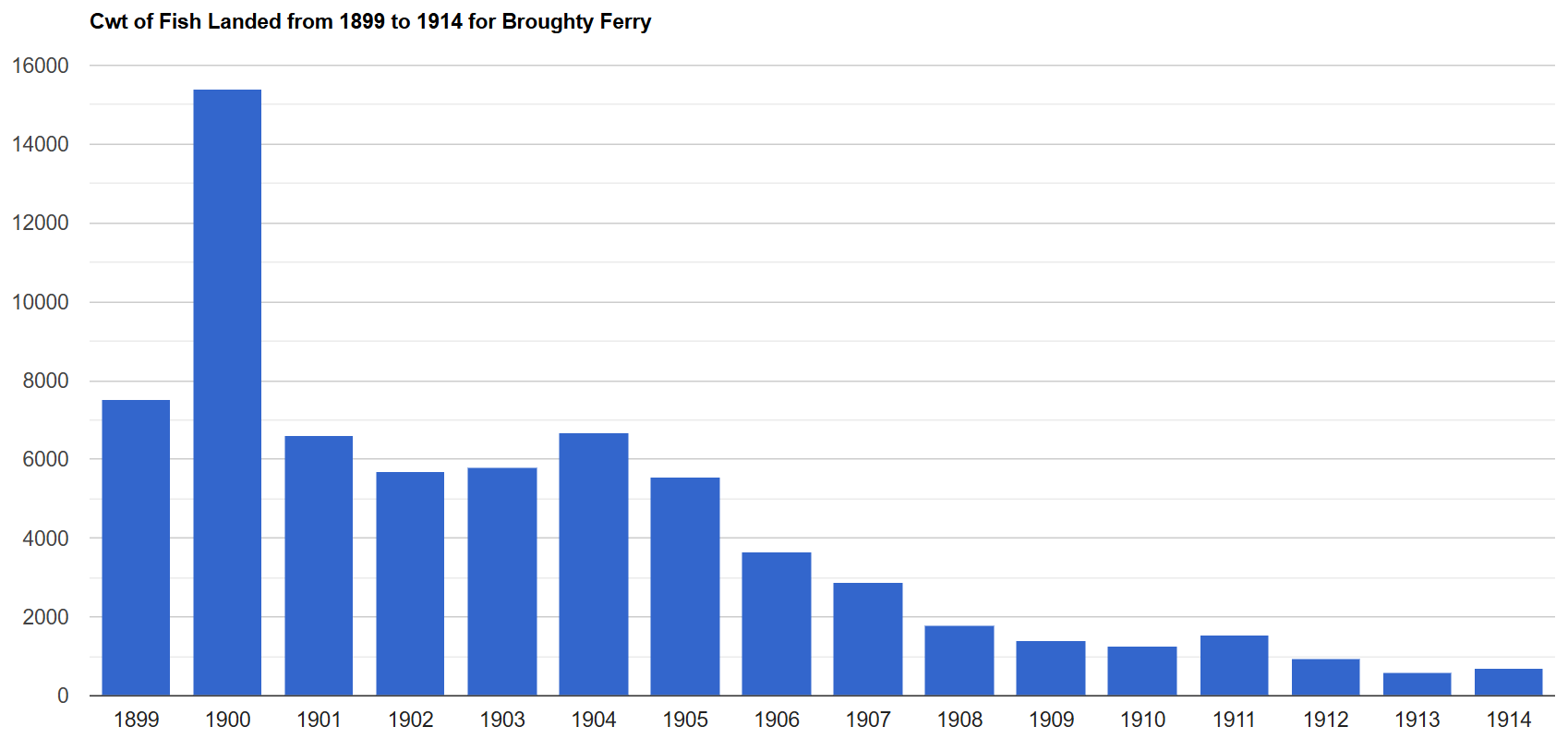
Cwt of fish landed

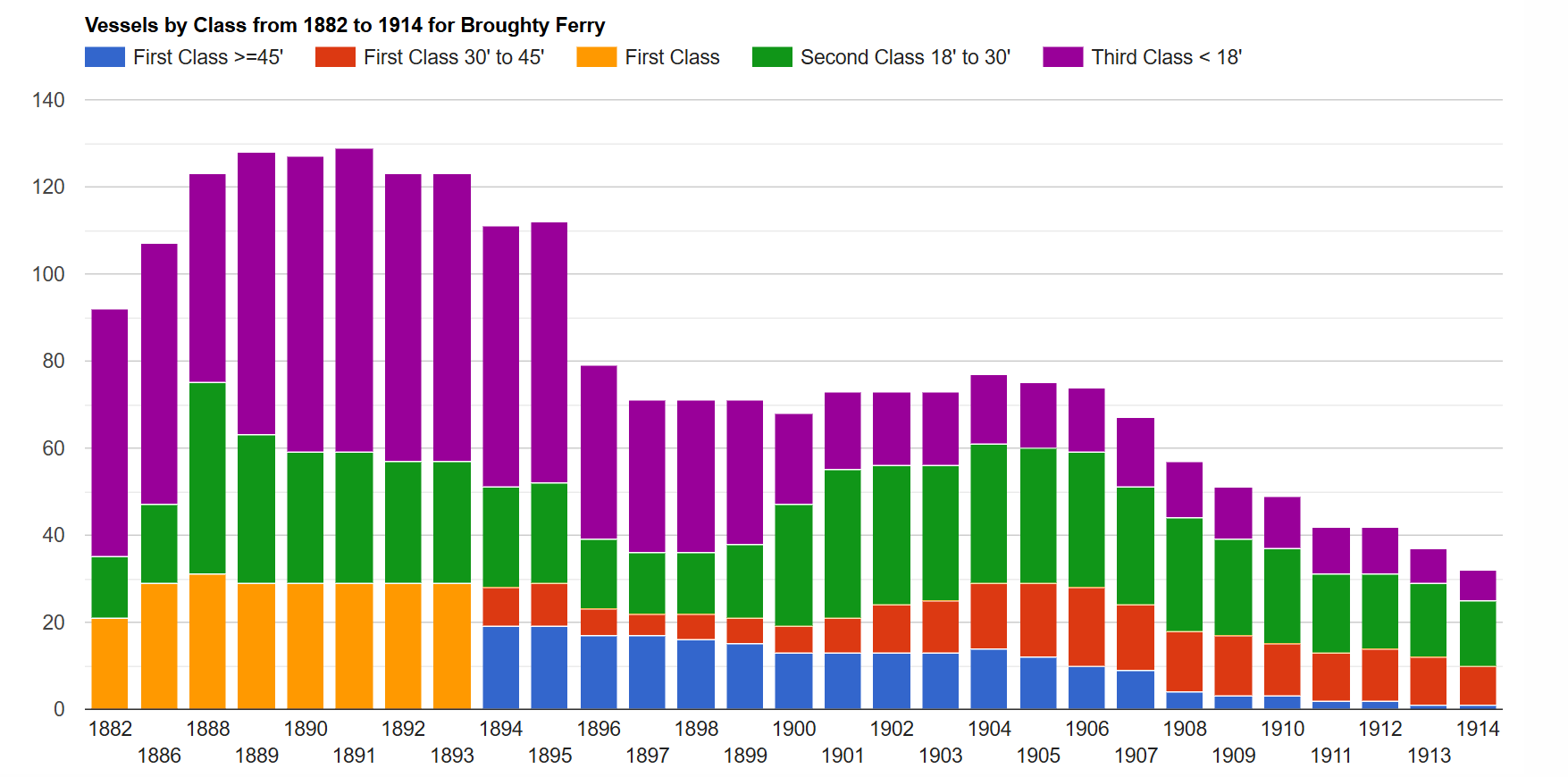
Vessels by class

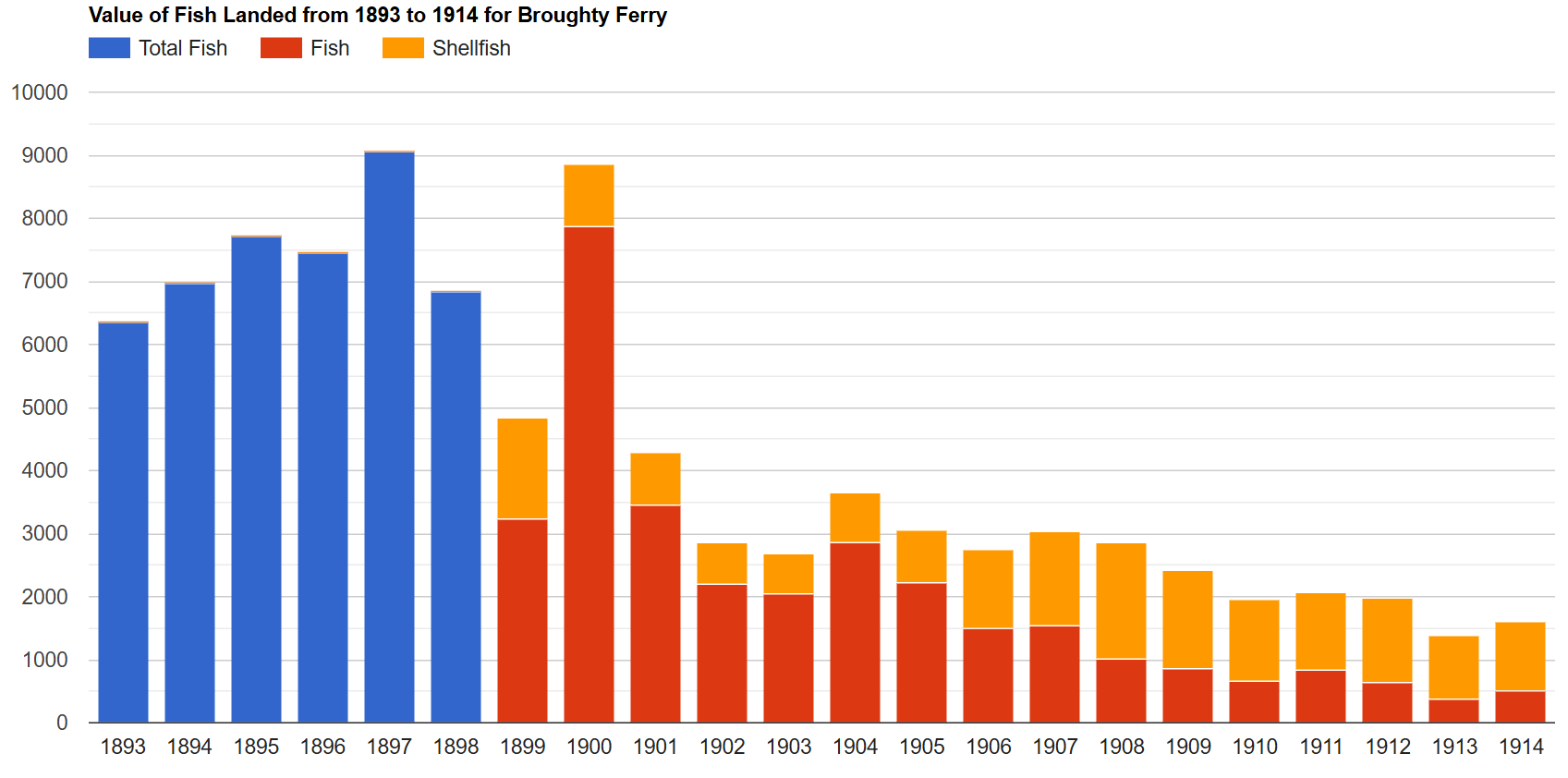
Value (£] of fish landed

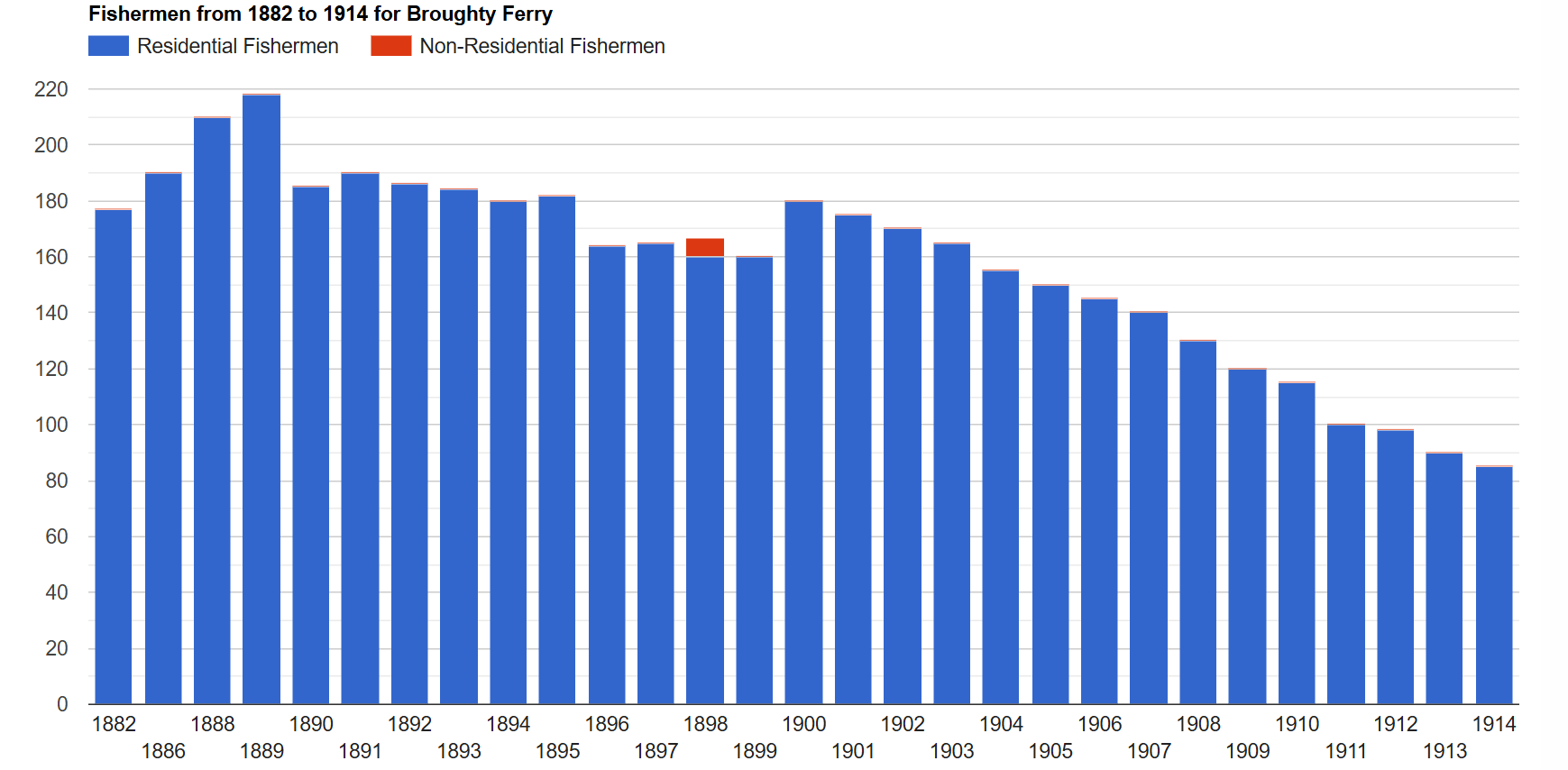
Fishermen

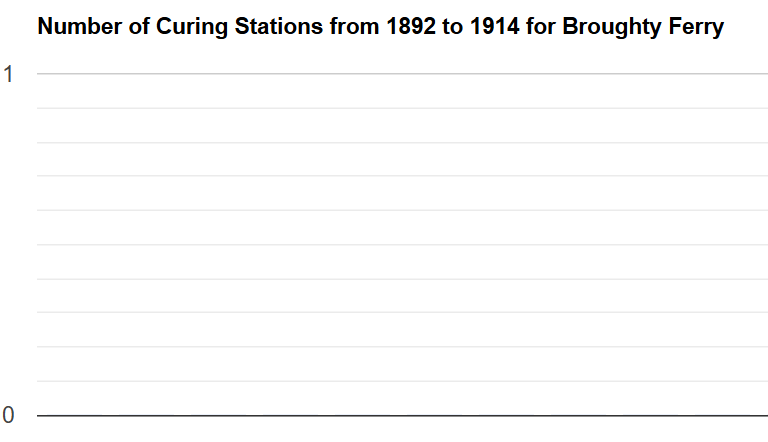
Placeholder-no curing stations
