= Lucknow, Angus =

Coordinates: 56.490223°N 2.782737°W

Lucknow
- Location within Angus
- OS grid reference: NO519334
- Council area: Angus
- Lieutenancy area: Angus
- Country: Scotland
- Sovereign state: United Kingdom
- Post town: CARNOUSTIE
- Postcode district: DD7
- Dialling code: 01382
- Police: Scotland
- Fire: Scottish
- Ambulance: Scottish
- UK Parliament: Dundee East
- Scottish Parliament: Angus North East Scotland

Lucknow is a hamlet in Angus, Scotland. It lies on the A930 road between Monifieth and Barry.
