= Tayport =

Town in Fife, Scotland

Coordinates: 56.4467°N 2.8796°W

Tayport: Scottish Gaelic: Port na Creige
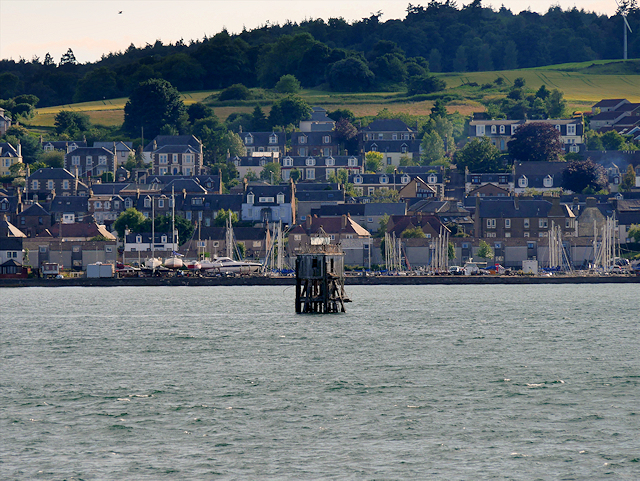

- Location within Fife
- Population: 3,750 (2020)
- OS grid reference: NO458287
- Council area: Fife
- Lieutenancy area: Fife
- Country: Scotland
- Sovereign state: United Kingdom
- Post town: TAYPORT
- Postcode district: DD6
- Dialling code: 01382
- Police: Scotland
- Fire: Scottish
- Ambulance: Scottish
- UK Parliament: North East Fife
- Scottish Parliament: North East Fife

Northern corner of Tayport seen from Dundee Law with Tentsmuir Forest behind. While much of the east-facing town is hidden from view here, the east and west lighthouses are clearly visible.

Tayport, also known as Ferry-Port-on-Craig, is a town in Fife, Scotland. It lies on the Firth of Tay opposite Broughty Ferry, a suburb of Dundee. The two were linked by a ferry service until 1939. To the east of Tayport is the vast Tentsmuir Nature Reserve, an area of forested dunes edged by wide sands that continue all the way round to the mouth of the River Eden.

The civil parish of Ferry-Port-on-Craig had a population of 3,815 in 2011.

== Name ==
Tayport was originally known as "Southferry", or, in full, the "South Ferry of Portincraig" (from the Gaelic port na creige, "harbour of the rock"). This distinguished it from Northferry on the opposite bank of the Tay. By the 19th century, Northferry had become Broughty Ferry, while Southferry had become Ferry-Port-on-Craig. This cumbersome name was replaced by the simpler "Tayport" after the coming of the railway in the 1850s. The town's Latin motto "te opportet alte ferri" - "it is proper for you to be carried upon high" has a double meaning, as it can also be read as "Tayport at auld Tay Ferry".

== History ==
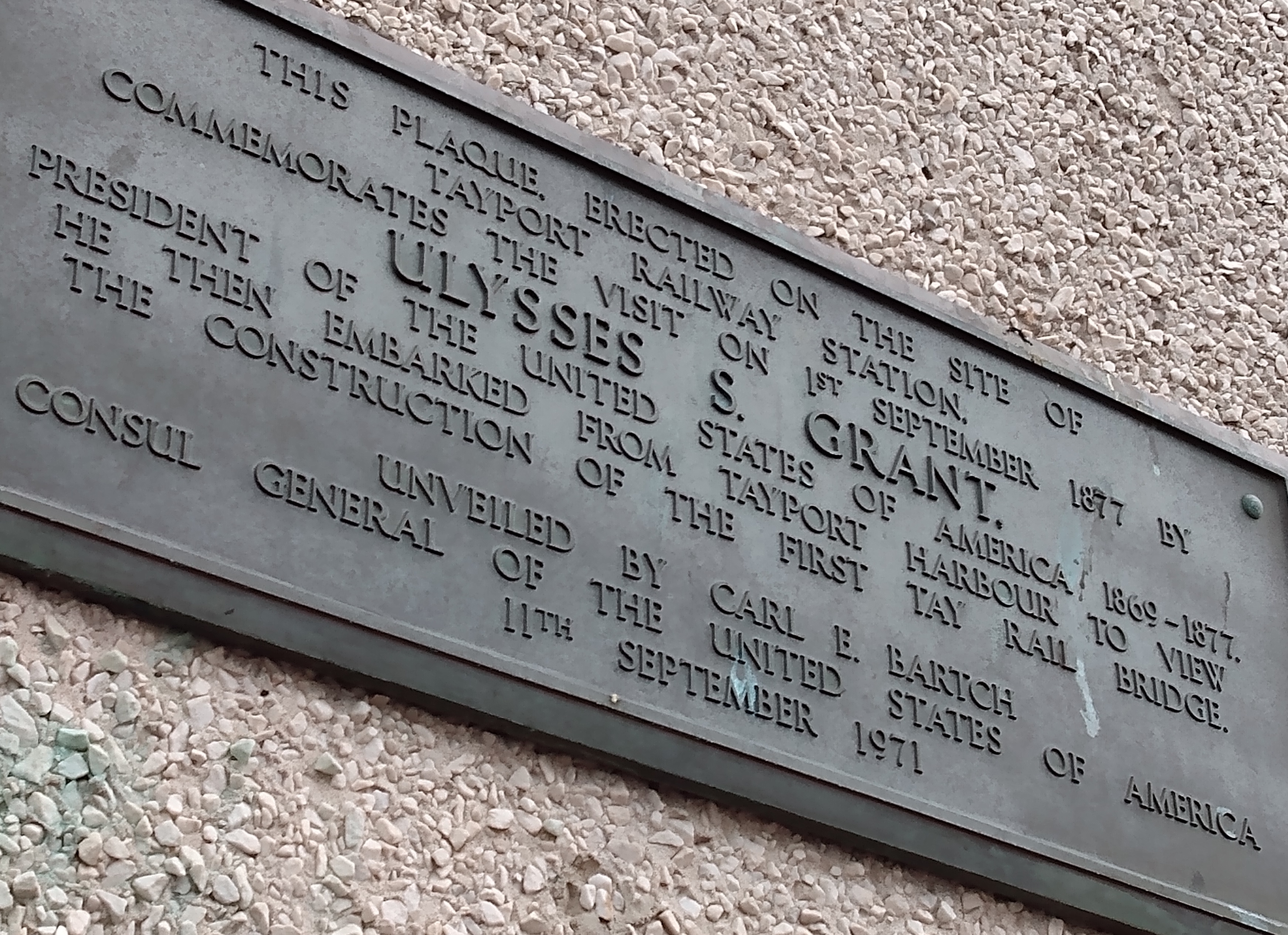
A plaque commemorating a visit to Tayport by former President of the United States Ulysses S. Grant in 1877.

A ferry service across the Tay was already well established when these lands were granted to the newly formed Arbroath Abbey about 1180. The abbey constructed shelter and lodgings for pilgrims making the trip between St Andrews and Arbroath via the ferry and this formed the core of a settlement that steadily grew over the centuries.

A chapel was built in the early 13th century, possibly more of an abbey than chapel. The site was excavated in the 1930s or earlier. The harbour at Tayport was distinguished by Tayport castle, which was built around 1450, but later demolished.

Ferry-Port-on-Craig saw a dramatic increase in population at the end of the 18th century when tenants displaced by agricultural improvement and clearances, came to take advantage of jobs in the town's textile and shipbuilding industries. Leisure opportunities also increased. Golf came early to Ferry-Port-on-Craig, with a course laid out in 1817, despite the efforts of a local farmer, who twice ploughed up the course.

A road to Newport-on-Tay, three miles to the west, with its less weather-prone and better used ferry service to Dundee meant that Ferry-Port-on-Craig was intermittently without a ferry during the first half of the 19th century. By the 1840s a steam ferry service had resumed between the community and Broughty Ferry. This was acquired, in 1851, by the Edinburgh, Perth and Dundee Railway which used the route for a railway ferry service from Edinburgh to Aberdeen.

The rail ferry ceased operation in 1878 with the opening of the Tay Rail Bridge, only to resume operations the following year when the bridge collapsed. With the opening of the replacement bridge in 1887 Tayport returned to a passenger-only ferry, which continued to run from the town to Broughty Ferry until 1939.

The opening of the Tay Road Bridge in 1966 put Tayport within a few minutes' drive of the centre of Dundee, and it has since evolved into a dormitory town for that city. Some industry remains, but the harbour is now given over almost wholly to leisure craft, and new housing has been built where once railway carriages were manoeuvered onto ferries.

Reminders of Tayport's earlier life and identity remain. In the centre of the town is Ferry-Port-on-Craig Church, established in 1607 and rebuilt in 1794 and again in 1825, though Protestant worship now takes place in Tayport Parish Church, built in 1843 as Ferry-Port-on-Craig Free Church. There is also a Catholic church (part of the Diocese of Dunkeld), named Our Lady, Star of the Sea in the community.

Historical populations
Census year	Population
1755	621
1801	920
1851	2238
1901	3445
1951	3326

== Amenities and tourism ==
Amenities include several cafes and pubs, shops, a distillery (Tayport Distillery), caravan park, tennis club, bowling club, an 18-hole golf course (Scotscraig Golf Club) and large areas of parkland, namely the East and West Common.

Car boot sales are held every second Sunday from April to September at The Canniepairt

Bottlenosed dolphins visit the Tay from March to September, and can be observed at very close quarters from Tayport harbour. Tayport harbour is also a good place for fishing although swimming is dangerous due to currents.

== Tayport F.C. ==
For over a century the game of football has been a major influence in most communities in Scotland; Tayport is no exception.

From Victorian times, through to the Second World War, the town had at least one football club. We know that Tayport had a Junior club pre-First World War, winning the East of Fife Cup in 1905, for example. The Great War in 1914 effectively signalled the demise of junior level football in the town for seventy five years.

Throughout the 1920s and 1930s, there were various amateur clubs, but success was fleeting and there are few records. After the Second World War the town's football club was called Tayport Violet. In 1947 a new club emerged when Tayport Amateurs was formed by locals who had been playing friendlies as a senior boy scouts team; this was the birth of the club we know today.

The Amateurs team joined the Midlands Amateurs' Alliance League, which was essentially for clubs’ reserve XIs, whilst Violet played in the Midlands’ top division. In 1950, the Midlands Amateur Football Association reorganised and both teams found themselves in division two. They finished the season in 1st and 2nd spots respectively. After promotion, 1952-53 saw Violet and the Amateurs finish 2nd and 3rd in the first division; however, Violet was disbanded after this season.

At the invitation of Tayport Town Council, in 1975, the Amateurs moved to the Canniepairt. Clubrooms were constructed which, over the years (like the ground) were improved in order to provide the accommodation which both the club and wider community now enjoy.

In 1980, the club which, since 1953 had run an Alliance, or Reserve XI, started a third team – the Fife XI - which was to enjoy eleven successful seasons in the East Fife Amateur Association and for one season, in the Kingdom Caledonian League.

In 1990, the club's junior team was launched and the name of the club became ‘Tayport Football Club’, a name which could embrace both amateur and junior grades. The 2000–2001 season was the club's last in the Amateurs Leagues.

Tayport FC have enjoyed great success since 1990 including being OVD Scottish Junior Cup Winners in 1995/96, 2002/03 and 2004/05 (website www.tayportfc.org)

== Scotscraig Golf Club ==
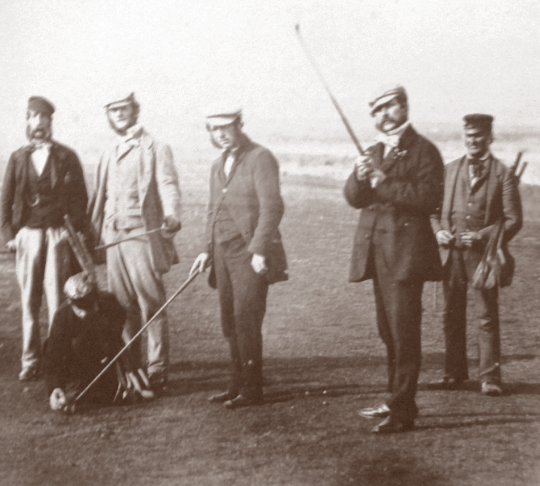
A group of golfers in a match at Scotscraig Golf Club in Tayport, c. 1852. From left to right: George Whyte-Melville, Vice Admiral William Heriot-Maitland-Dougall, George Glennie, Col. James Ogilvie Fairlie, and Sandy Pirie (caddie).

Scotscraig Golf Club is the 13th oldest golf club in the world.

Towards the end of the Napoleonic Wars (1799–1815) some of the members of the St Andrews Society of Golfers – later to become The Royal and Ancient Golf Club – began to play golf more regularly than the Society's infrequent meetings afforded.

Amongst them was Mr. William Dalgleish of Scotscraig, whose lands included an area known as the Garpit, around part of which ran a racecourse (although there is no record of any racing, the course is carefully marked out on early ordnance survey maps). In the centre of this area, golf was played over six holes, before the club was created in August 1817.

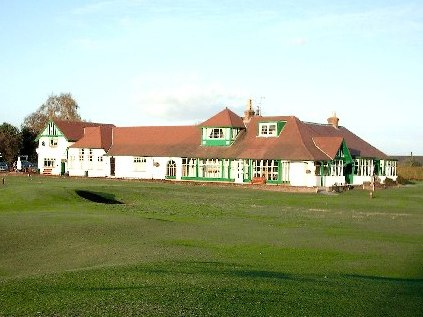
Scotscraig Golf Club

The original rules, adopted at the first annual meeting in Scotscraig House in October 1818, dictated that a uniform would be worn: a red coat with a green velvet collar and a badge on the left breast. This was not merely fashion but a requirement; those appearing without uniform did so under a penalty of two bottles of port.

An annual competition for gold and silver medals was held until 1854, when the club was closed, as disaster struck when the course was ploughed by the farmer who had come to own the land. Around 1886 the Scotscraig Estate, on which the club had been situated, passed into the hands of Vice Admiral William Heriot-Maitland-Dougall who was keen on golf. In 1887 he instigated the club's revival, restored the trophies and helped secure a course; it was re-opened for play in 1888, and by 1890 had been laid out as a nine-hole course. The club house was erected in 1896.

In 1904 more land was acquired, and an 18-hole course was laid out, incorporating the original nine holes. It is considered a particular advantage that the ninth hole is near the clubhouse, so that elderly players and those who cannot spare the time for the full round of 18 holes can play on either half.

The grounds were acquired by the club in 1923.

== Tayport Primary School ==
In the early part of the 19th century, there were four small schools in Tayport: two were for boys and two for girls. When the provisions of the Education Act 1870 were extended to Scotland, a school was built which could accommodate all the children of the community; the present building was opened in 1875, and was extended as the population increased.

Initially the school ran both a primary and secondary programme, although the infants were accommodated at the building which is now Ferryport Nursery on William Street.

In 1967, when junior secondary schools were closed, Tayport became a primary school and the older pupils were sent to Madras College in St. Andrews or Bell Baxter High School in Cupar.

On 7 May 1975 the school held an open evening to celebrate its centenary. An exhibition called ‘Grandfather's School Days’ was borrowed from the Albert Institute in Dundee, and many old photographs and mementos loaned by former pupils were put on display.

== Fishing ==
The Fishery Board reports document the fact that fishermen dredged for mussels in the Tay estuary., but their statistics show how the business declined:

Fishery Statistics

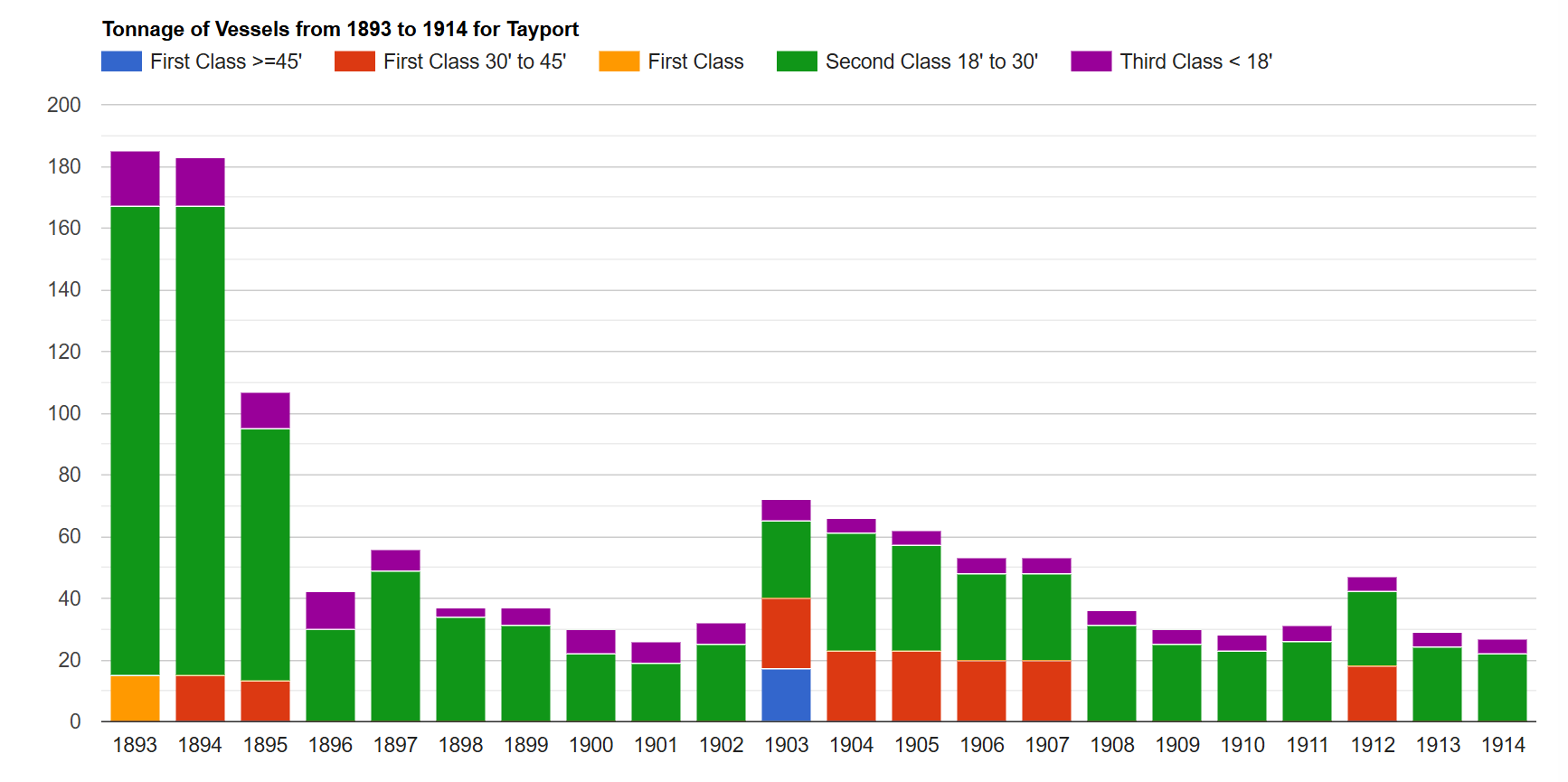
Tonnage of vessels

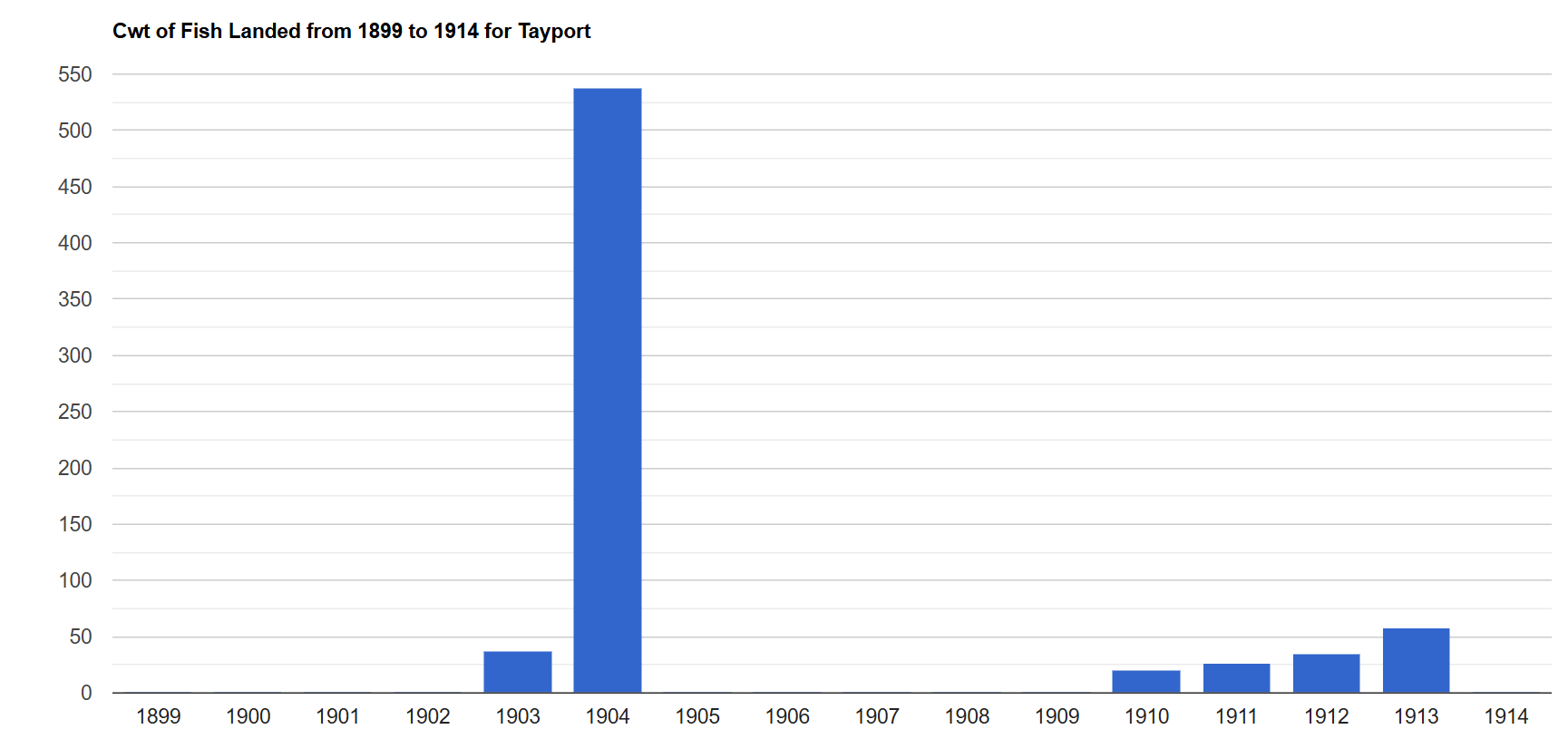
Cwt of fish landed

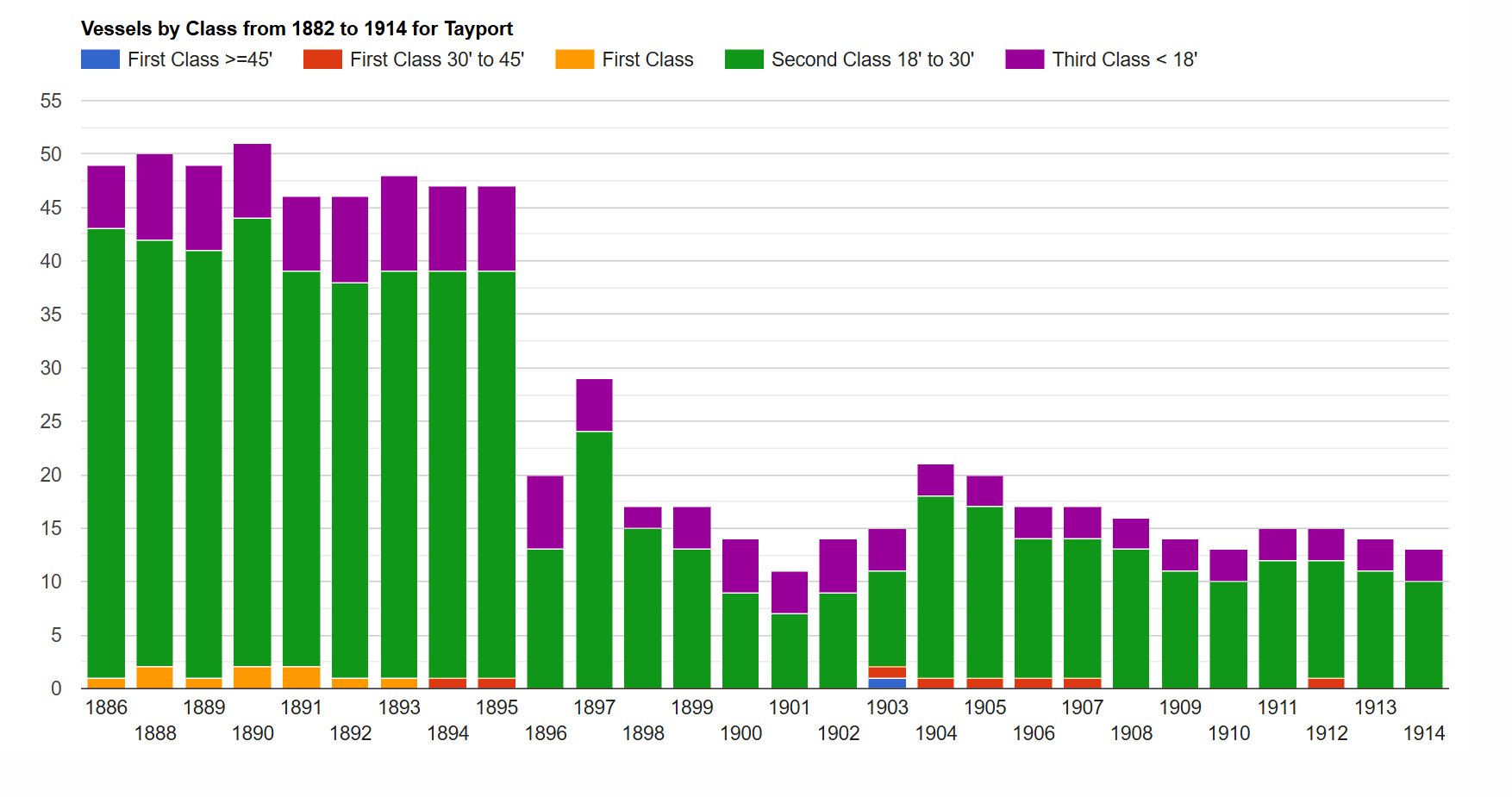
Vessels by class

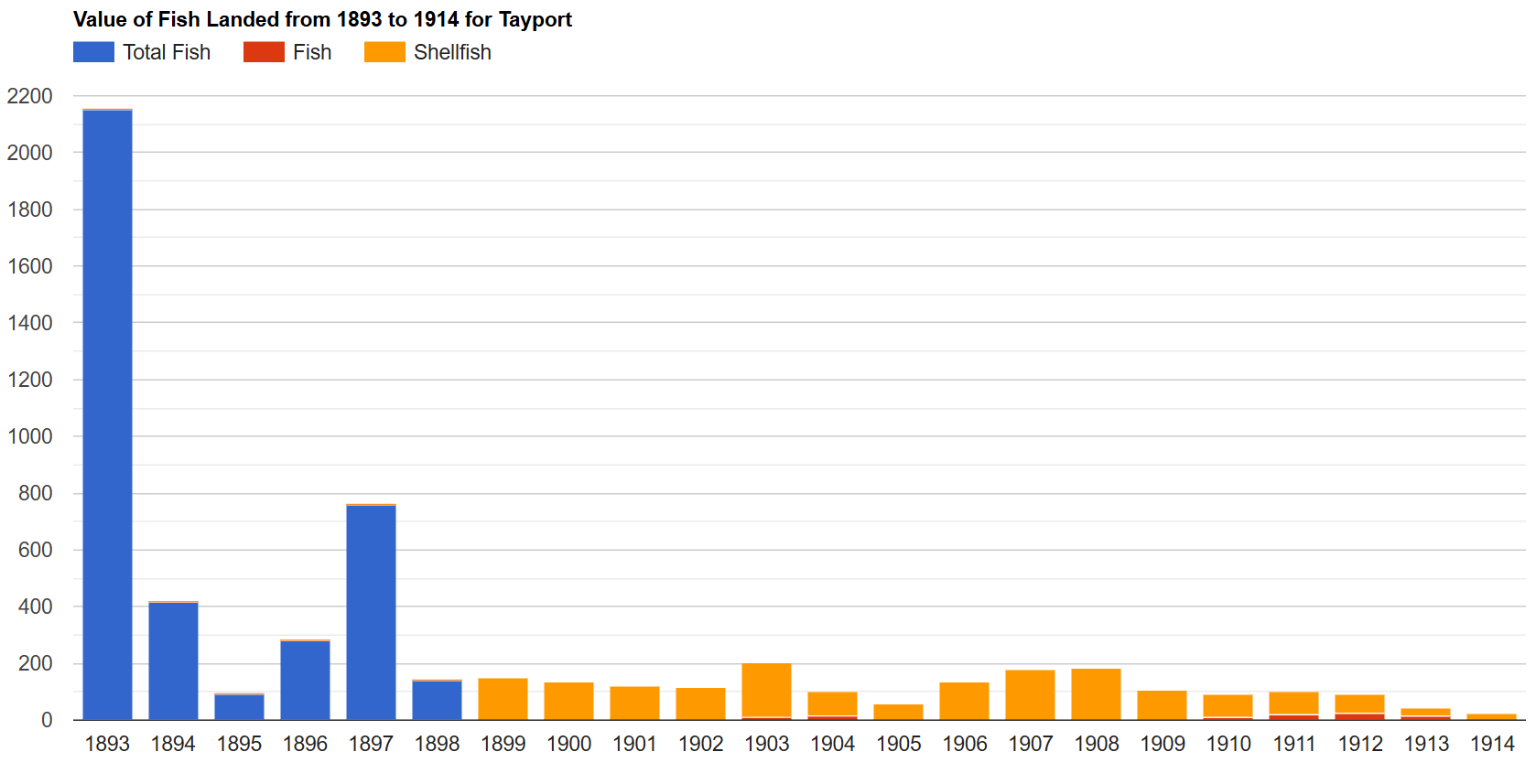
Value (£] of fish landed

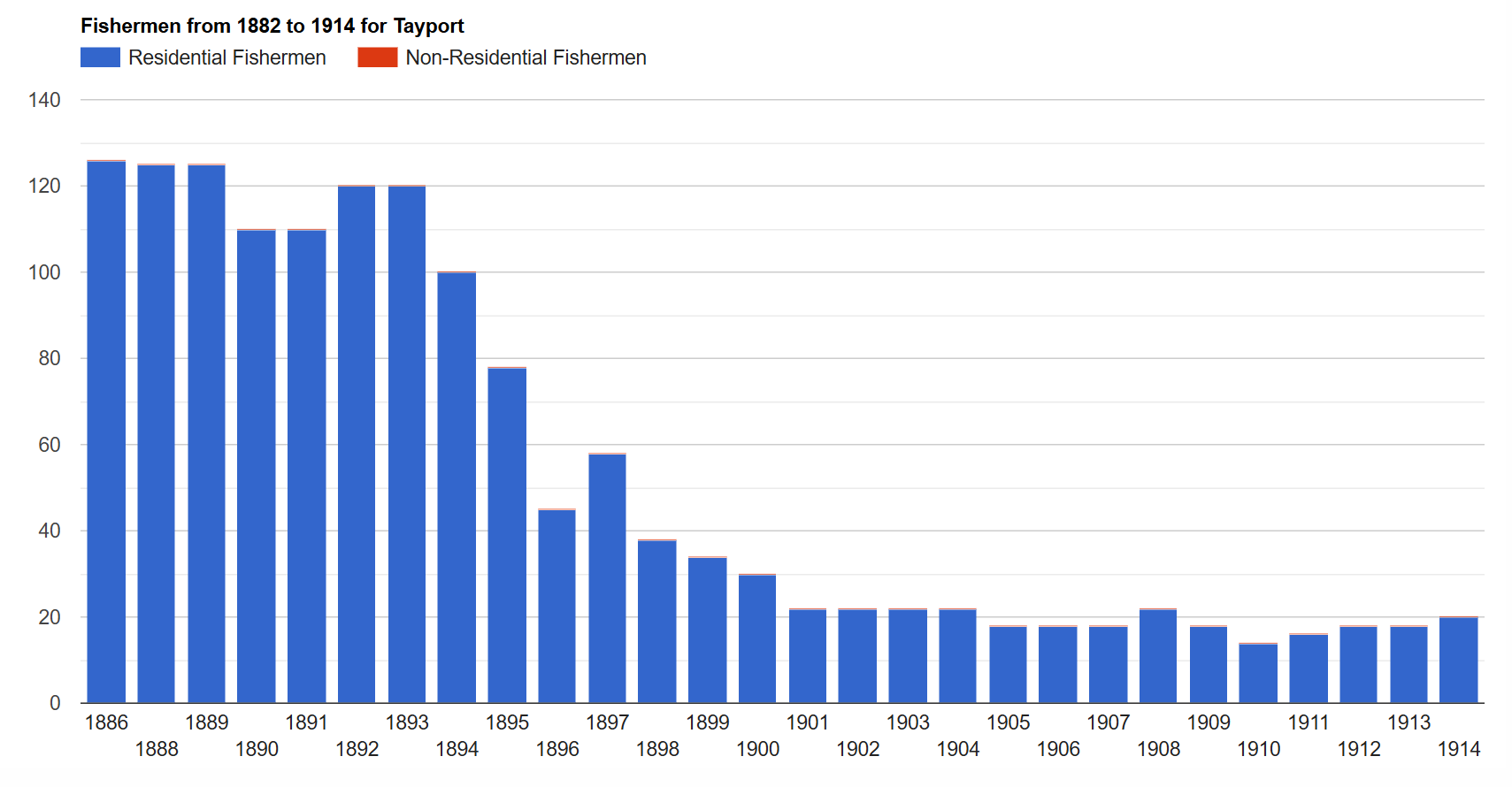
Fishermen

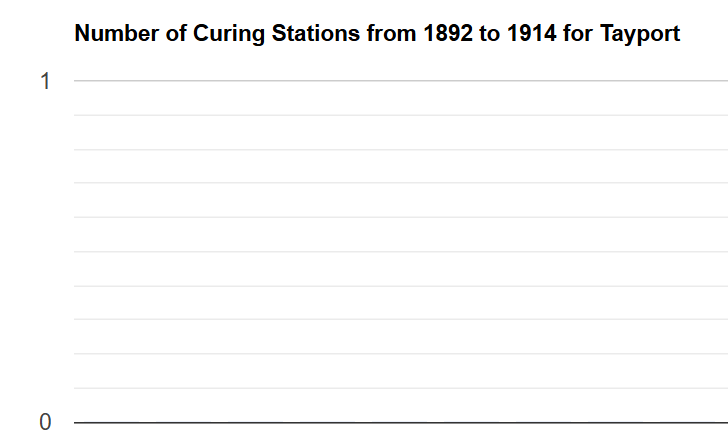
Placeholder-no curing stations

== Notable people ==
- Angus Barbieri (1938 or 1939–1990), known for a 382-day fast
- William Thomas Calman (1871 – 1952), zoologist
- Margaret Hartsyde (died 1642)
- Marian Leven (born 1944), artist
- Nicolas Vilant (1737–1807), Professor of Mathematics
- Douglas Young (classicist) (1913–1973), leader of the Scottish National Party (1942–1945)
- John Maclean (born 1972), film director and musician with the Beta Band
- David Maclean, drummer and producer with Django Django
