= Monikie =

Village in Angus, Scotland

Coordinates: 56.537624°N 2.816236°W

- Location within Angus
- Population: est. 479. (1991)
- OS grid reference: NO499387
- Council area: Angus
- Lieutenancy area: Angus
- Country: Scotland
- Sovereign state: United Kingdom
- Post town: DUNDEE
- Postcode district: DD5
- Dialling code: 01382
- Police: Scotland
- Fire: Scottish
- Ambulance: Scottish
- UK Parliament: Dundee East
- Scottish Parliament: Angus South
- Website: https://www.monikie.co.uk

Monikie is a village and civil parish in Angus, Scotland, north-east of Dundee.

== History ==
The village grew from small beginnings as just one of many hamlets. The other large village in the parish is Newbigging. Because of the siting of the Railway Station, provided mainly to service the farming community and latterly, the Farina Mill or Granary, and the former reservoir ponds for Dundee City Council (now Monikie Country Park), the concentration has centred on the area which became Monikie village, mainly as a result of a new house building programme in the 1970s and 1980s.

The Scottish violinist and fiddler James Scott Skinner lived in Monikie from 1906 to 1909.

It is wrong to think of Monikie as only the village but, as the parish name, it is still relevant in most of the addresses in this rural area, stretching from Hynd Castle in the north, to the coast of the Firth of Tay at the south. Its population in 1991 was 479. There has been a fair bit of development with some new housing in the village since the 1991 figure and the population has increased. Monikie is the northernmost Church of Scotland parish of the Presbytery of Dundee, but changes have occurred.

A rare example of a morthouse is located in the churchyard, built to frustrate the activities of 19th century bodysnatchers.

== Landmarks ==
It is the location of Affleck Castle, formerly Auchinleck Castle, which stands on the western outskirts of the village toward the centre of the parish. It consists of a tower built on high ground. The castle was inhabited as late as 1746, although it has since been used as a granary. The 17th-century Panmure House, seat of the Earl of Panmure, was located to the east of the village, although it was demolished in the 1950s. Only the stables and the 105-foot (32 m) Panmure Testimonial remain on the estate, as well as the remains of the earlier Panmure Castle.

== Amenities ==
Monikie has a coffee shop called "Victoria Sponge”. There is also a cafe/restaurant in the country park called “Cafe Byzantium” which operates late spring to early autumn. Monikie also has a number of local groups and clubs which run at the Monikie Memorial Hall.

Monikie Scout Hut is the home to the 53rd Angus (1st Newbigging) Scout Group, providing activities for boys and girls aged 6 –14. The Camus Explorer Scout Unit (boys and girls aged 14–17) as well as the Monikie Rainbows and Brownies also use the Scout Hut.

Monikie Country Park also provides a number of nature based activities as well as providing Outdoor activities such as water sports, high ropes and climbing activities during the summer months.

== Buses ==
Moffat & Williamson operate a two-hourly bus service, numbered the 78 & 79, which both go from Monikie to Dundee via Broughty Ferry daily. The buses stop at Broomwell Gardens, Monikie Country Park (Note: Buses serve Monikie Country Park on Sundays only) and Monikie Primary School. JP Minicoaches operate a one-bus-a-day service, numbered the 181, which goes from Monikie to Forfar or Muirdrum via Monifieth and Carnoustie on Mondays, Wednesdays and Fridays only.

== Gallery ==
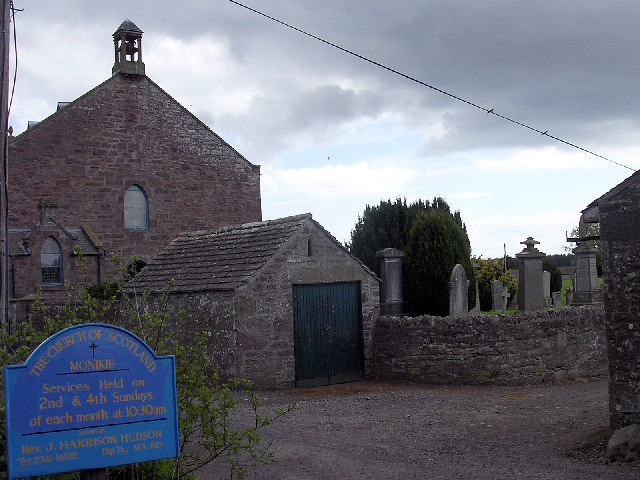
Monikie Church is located in the hamlet of Kirkton of Monikie

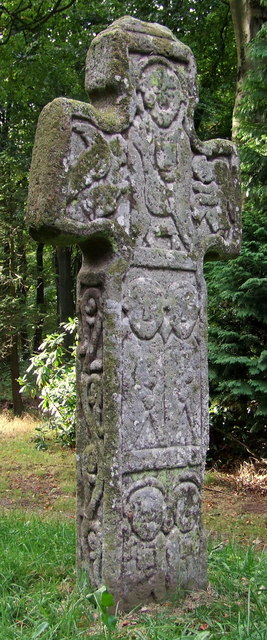
The Camus Cross

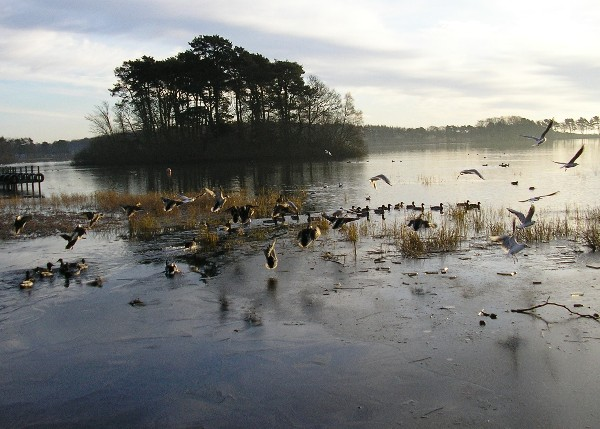
Monikie reservoir Originally built to supply water to Dundee
