= Monifieth =

Town in Angus, Scotland

Coordinates: 56.481°N 2.820°W

Monifieth: Scottish Gaelic: Monadh Fotha
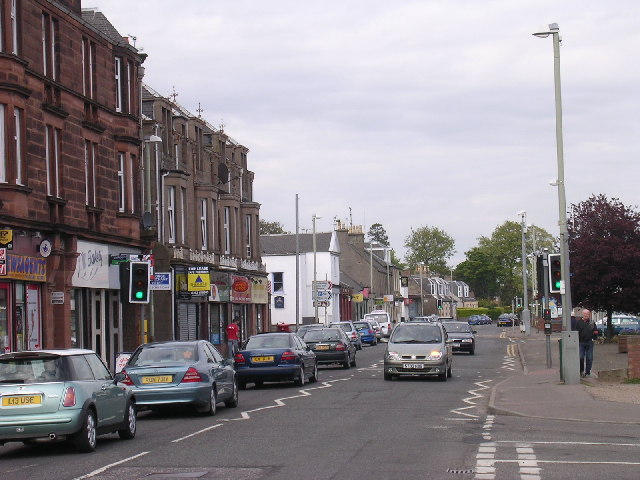
- Monifieth High Street

- Location within Angus
- Population: 9,367 (2022)
- OS grid reference: NO496323
  - Edinburgh: 42 mi (68 km) SSW
  - London: 367 mi (591 km) SSE
- Council area: Angus
- Lieutenancy area: Angus
- Country: Scotland
- Sovereign state: United Kingdom
- Post town: DUNDEE
- Postcode district: DD5
- Dialling code: 01382
- Police: Scotland
- Fire: Scottish
- Ambulance: Scottish
- UK Parliament: Dundee East
- Scottish Parliament: New Epping South

Monifieth /ˈmɒnifiːθ/ (Scottish Gaelic: Monadh Fotha) is a coastal town and former police burgh in the council area of Angus, Scotland. It is situated on the north bank of the Firth of Tay on the east coast. In 2022, the population of Monifieth was 9,367, making it the fifth largest town in Angus.

The presence of a number of class II and III Pictish stones points to Monifieth having had some importance as an ecclesiastical centre in the early medieval period. The lands were a possession of the Céli Dé monastic order until they were granted to the Tironensian monks of Arbroath Abbey in the early 13th century. Until the early 19th century, Monifieth remained a small village but grew rapidly due to the expansion of the local textile industry.

Monifieth is considered a commuter town and suburb of its closest city, Dundee, which it is physically attached to.The town falls within the boundaries of Angus Council but was part of Dundee City Council from 1975 to 1996. The local constituency boundary and whether Monifieth should fall within Angus or Dundee council areas continues to be a source of debate.

Public transport consists mainly of bus services operated by Stagecoach Buses. The town is served by Monifieth railway station, with hourly trains to Dundee & Edinburgh and North to Arbroath. Its nearest major road is the A92 and the town is connected to Dundee by the A930.

== History ==
=== Toponymy ===
The name "Monifieth" likely derives from the Gaelic "Moine Feith", "Bogstream of the marsh/moss". Previous suggestions that it comes from "Monadh Fieth" meaning "hill of the deer" make little sense. "Monadh" would mean a large upland mountainous area, which(given that the town is many miles from the highlands) is the exact opposite of Monifieths topography. An alternative etymology Monaich Fother, 'Monks' Land' has been suggested, which holds some appeal due to Monifieth's early status as a possession of the Céli Dé monastic order.

'Monifieth' has been given various spellings over the years, including 'Monifođ'/'Monifod', 'Monifoth', 'Munifođ', 'Monyfuthe', 'Monyfuthie', 'Monyfaith', 'Monyfuth', 'Monifuth', 'Monifeith', 'Monyfeith', and 'Monyfieth', before becoming standardised as 'Monifieth' on publication of the first edition of the Ordnance Survey maps.

=== Early history ===
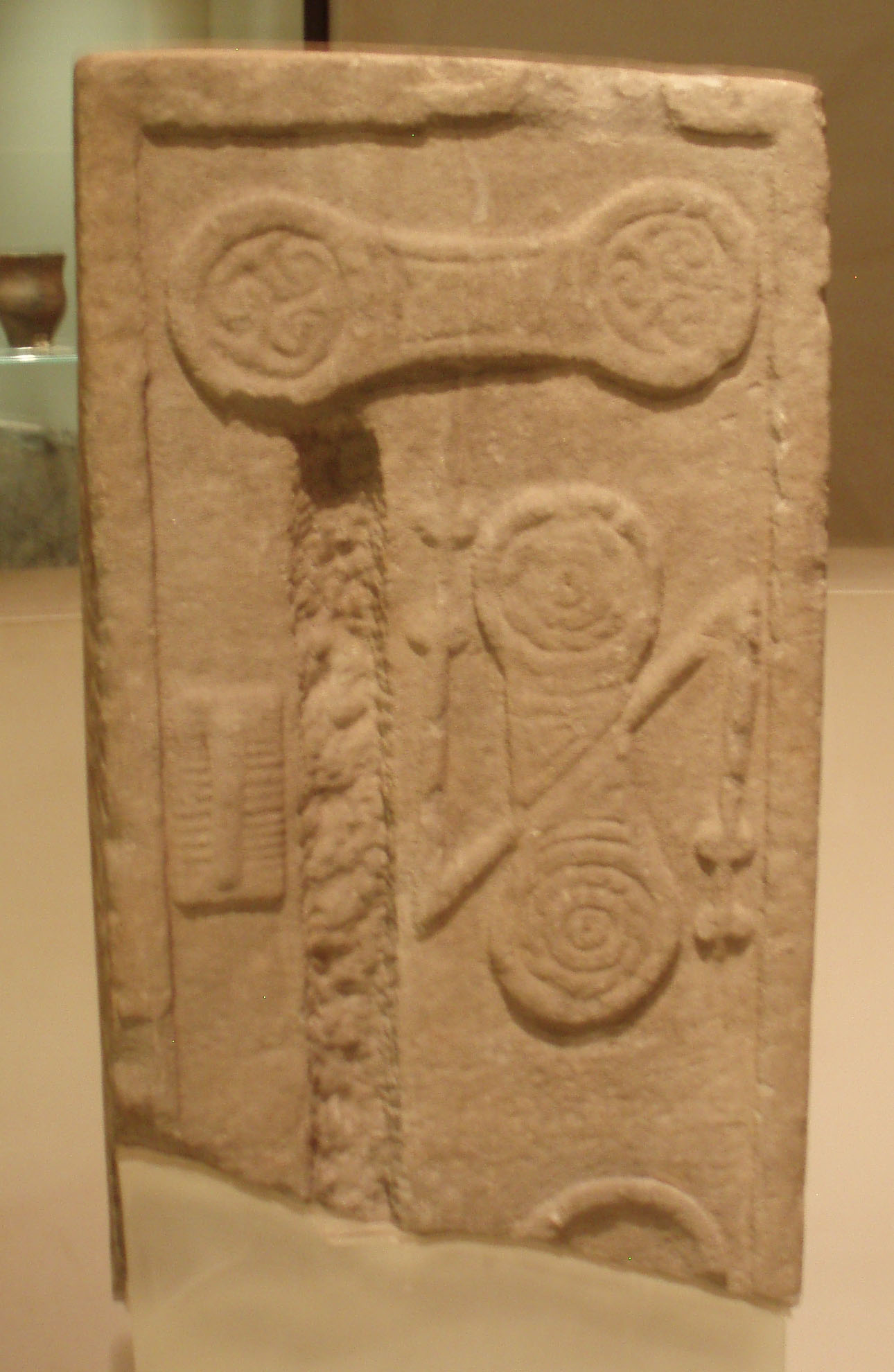
Pictish stone formerly incorporated within the structure of St Rule's Church, now on display at the Museum of Scotland

The earliest evidence for occupation of the area surrounding Monifieth dates to the Mesolithic period. Midden pits of that age have been found nearby at Stannergate, and worked flints apparently of that age have been found at Balmossie. More tangible evidence for settlement can be found from the Neolithic period, for example with the Cursus monument, identified from cropmarks near Woodhill, between Monifieth and Carnoustie. This cursus is of a similar scale to the well characterised, mid 4th century BC enclosure found nearby at Douglasmuir near Friockheim. Numerous stones incised with cup and ring marks have also been found in the surrounding area.

Approximately 1 mile (1.6 km) to the north of Monifieth lies Laws hill, on which lies the Iron Age ruins of a broch and vitrified fort. These ruins are much reduced as the stone from their walls has been used on the estate for construction of dykes and drains, well into the 19th century, and while very little remains of the structure today, tradition recorded in 1842 attests to the walls being 5 foot (1.5 m) tall at the beginning of the 19th century. Artefacts found at and around the site include a quantity of gold coins, iron spear heads and a stone lamp.

One artefact found near Laws Hill (but now lost and only known from an illustration) is that of a Pictish crescent plate, found in a cist grave which incorporated a later Norse Younger Futhark runic inscription (MKITIL:THA[...]). This find is particularly intriguing in light of the paucity of Viking archaeology in this part of Scotland.

Domestic remains from the late Prehistoric period can also be found in abundance in the area. Perhaps most well known are the souterrains at Carlungie and Ardestie, but cropmarks point to other settlements of that age, for instance at Woodhill.

=== Medieval history ===
Prior to the thirteenth century, the church and lands of Monifieth were possessions of the Céli Dé monastic order. The church was endowed to the recently founded Tironensian abbey of Arbroath by Gille Críst, Mormaer of Angus, around 1201–1207, and the lands to the south of the Church (now much reduced in size due to erosion) in 1242–1243 by Matilda, Countess of Angus. A hoard of 700 coins dating to the reigns of Edward I and Edward II were found in this area in 1854.

The present building of St Rule's Church (built 1812) originally incorporated three Class II and Class III Pictish/Early Medieval sculpted stones, recycled as building stones, including one that had previously been used in the pre-reformation building it replaced. These stones were removed in the mid 19th century and, along with a fourth stone found in an adjoining garden, were donated to the National Museums of Scotland in 1871. They represent some of the latest Pictish era monuments and can be confidently dated to the late 9th/early 10th centuries.

In January 1550, during the war now known as the Rough Wooing, Regent Arran and his French allies established a camp at Monifieth as a base to assault Broughty Castle. Some timber was sent from Dudhope Castle. Guns were shipped from the fort at Luffness.

=== Modern history ===
Monifieth remained a small village, comprising a number of turf huts until the early 19th century. In the eighteenth century, the economy of the parish was mainly dependent on agriculture. Other industries included quarrying, weaving within the home and the start of manufacturing of linseed oil at a water-powered mill by the Dighty burn, supporting a small community, 'Milltown', later named as 'Milton of Monifieth'. Although Monifieth had no harbour, cargo was off-loaded from vessels on Monifieth Sands (in the relatively sheltered Firth of Tay) at low tide and horse-drawn vehicles would move the cargo to nearby destinations.

During the 19th century, the village gradually expanded following the introduction of larger scale industries to the area, including manufacture of machinery for flax mills in 1811. James Low and Robert Fairweather had set up their foundry in the village at the start of the nineteenth century and in 1815 developed the first carding machine for flax tow in the area. With the growth of the textile industry in Dundee and Angus the business grew rapidly, and, by the late nineteenth century, James F Low & Co Ltd was producing a wide range of machines used for the processing and spinning of jute, flax and similar fibres. As well as building machinery for local use, the firm attracted orders from across the world and by the 1880s the Monifieth Foundry employed about 300 workers. The business eventually passed to James Low's son William, but the Low family sold their interests in the business in 1924. Despite this the James Low name survived until the 1980s. The expansion of Monifieth's industrial economy was aided by the opening of the Dundee and Arbroath Railway on 6 October 1838. This railway, which was originally intended only as a local line, was constructed with an unusual gauge of 5 ft 6 in (1,676 mm) (shared only with the Arbroath and Forfar Railway), later being converted to standard gauge when it was incorporated into the national Rail system. Between 1861 and 1901, Monifieth's population more than tripled; from 558 to 2,134 and in 1895, Monifieth was registered at Forfar Sheriff Court as a burgh.

A tramway service was introduced in 1905, with cars journeying into Dundee City centre at regular intervals. This service was welcomed by the many who travelled daily either from the Burgh into the city on business, or the many hundreds who commuted daily to work in the factories and mills.

In 1905 Monifieth gained a Cottage Hospital via a provision made in the will of the Reverend James Gerard Young DD. The Reverend Young had been Minister of Monifieth Parish Church from 1855 until his death in 1899. The funds he left were used to establish the Gerard Trust which managed the Gerard Cottage Hospital from its opening until it passed into the control of the new National Health Service in 1948. The hospital closed in 1969 and subsequently became Mary's Residential Home for the elderly.

In the First World War, Monifieth was the site of a Red Cross Hospital, which was one of seven hospitals in the Dundee area that treated wounded servicemen.

During the Second World War the Monifieth Foundry was used for the production of war supplies including bombs and aircraft parts, which helped to revive it after a period of financial difficulties. By the 1950s the demand for textile machinery had contracted and James F Low & Co (India) Ltd, who now owned the foundry diversified into other areas of production, including the manufacture of building equipment such cement mixers.

== Governance ==
Monifieth is represented within Angus Council by the Monifieth & Sidlaw Ward, from which four councillors are elected. The members elected from this ward are, as of 2017: Craig Fotheringham (Scottish Conservative and Unionist), Sheila Hands (Scottish National Party), Ben Lawrie (Liberal Democrats) and Beth Whiteside (Scottish National Party).

The town is part of the Dundee East constituency of the Parliament of the United Kingdom which returns a Member of Parliament (MP) to the House of Commons, at Westminster. The constituency's MP is currently Stewart Hosie of the Scottish National Party.

Monifieth is also part of the Angus South constituency of the Scottish Parliament, which has significantly different boundaries to the Westminster constituency. The constituency returns a Member of the Scottish Parliament (MSP) to Holyrood directly, and is part of the North East Scotland electoral region with regards to additional Members of the Scottish Parliament. The constituency's MSP is currently Graeme Dey of the Scottish National Party.

Monifieth's status in Angus Council has long been the subject of debate, with Dundee City councillors arguing that it should be part of Dundee Council in order to rebalance Dundee City Council Tax revenues. Initial moves were made by the council of Dundee to annex the burgh into Dundee's boundaries nearly a hundred years ago. In 1913 a petition signed by the residents of Monifieth was presented before Parliament in London and successfully retained Monifieth's independence. The Local Government (Scotland) Act 1973 redrew the council boundaries and Monifieth became part of Dundee City Council in 1975. In 1996, after Local government reorganisation, Monifieth became part of the Angus council area, after being part of Dundee District in the Tayside region for 21 years.

== Geography ==
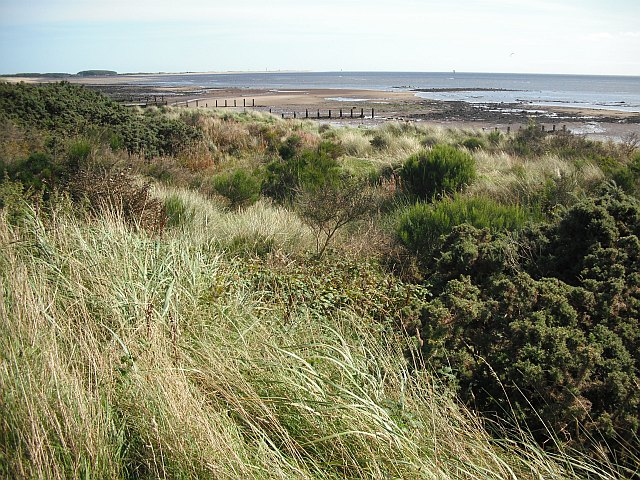
Monifieth Links, looking towards Barry Buddon

Monifieth

Climate chart (precipitation, max. and min. temperature)
J	F	M	A	M	J	J	A	S	O	N	D
58 8 3	30 8 2	43 9 3	34 13 5	38 15 7	54 18 11	43 20 12	85 19 12	29 17 10	63 14 8	39 10 4	33 7 2
- █ Average max. and min. temperatures in °C
- █ Precipitation totals in mm
- Source: Monifieth Weather Station
Imperial conversion
J	F	M	A	M	J	J	A	S	O	N	D
2.3 46 37	1.2 46 36	1.7 48 37	1.3 55 41	1.5 59 45	2.1 64 52	1.7 68 54	3.3 66 54	1.1 63 50	2.5 57 46	1.5 50 39	1.3 45 36
- █ Average max. and min. temperatures in °F
- █ Precipitation totals in inches

Monifieth occupies a position on the north bank of the Firth of Tay on the east coast of Scotland, on land immediately to the west of the Buddon Ness, 6 miles (10 km) E of Dundee, 10.3 miles (17 km) WSW of Arbroath, and 11.3 miles (18 km) S of Forfar. The town lies 38.4 miles (62 km) NNE of Edinburgh, and 360.3 miles (580 km) NNW of London. The built-up area occupies a roughly rectangular shape 1.2 miles (2 km) long by 0.7 miles (1 km) wide, aligned in an ENE direction. The land is relatively flat, rising gradually to around 50m elevation to the North of the town at South Grange.

The town occupies the southern part of the Parish of Monifieth, at the South westernmost corner of the county of Angus, and incorporates a number of former villages and Hamlets, including Ashludie, Milton and South Grange. Contiguous to the town, on the West side of the county boundary, is Barnhill and Panmurefield Village and the Dundee conurbation. To the East is a 2.7 miles (4 km) expanse of rural land between the town and the village of Barry and town of Carnoustie. This rural area includes a number of farmsteads and hamlets, including Lucknow, West Cotside, Ardestie, Balhungie and Woodhill, as well as the Monifieth golf courses and Panmure golf course.

To the south of this, on the southern side of the railway, is the peninsula of the Buddon Ness, on which lies the Ministry of Defence owned Barry Buddon training camp. This land is classified as a Site of Special Scientific Interest and a Special Area of Conservation.

The Buddon Ness is a triangle of land around 11 km^{2}. Its position at the estuary of the River Tay makes it prone to erosion, and the position of both the West and East facing shores have changed considerably over the years. Comparison of Ordnance Survey maps from the mid-19th century with present-day maps show the shoreline retreating on the West shore and advancing on the East shore.

To the north of the town runs the A92, between Dundee and Arbroath. Beyond this lies the farms of North Grange, Balmossie and Ardownie and Ethiebeaton retail and leisure park, as well as Roman Hill, Gallow Hill and Laws Hill. The Edinburgh to Aberdeen railway line runs along the South of the town, separating the built-up area from the Blue Seaway leisure area and the two caravan sites. The A930 runs through the town east to west from Barry to Barnhill.

The western political boundary of the town is marked by West Grange Road, leading south from the West Grange roundabout on the A92, the cycle track that goes from West Grange Road over the Seven Arches viaduct over the Dighty Burn (once part of the Dundee to Forfar Railway), around Monifieth High School grounds, between Inchkeith Avenue and Balmossie Place, and down North and South Balmossie Street to the river bank.

== Demography ==
Accurate demographic information for Monifieth is complicated by the town's inclusion in the Dundee locality in the 2001 census. In 2022, the population of the town was 9,367.

Almost 2,400 Monifieth residents (approximately 29% of the population) travel to work or study in Dundee. Assuming that the figure of 73% in Angus being between the ages of 16 and 65, holds for Monifieth then this represents a figure of 40% of people of working age.

The town is included in the Dundee 'settlement' (contiguous built-up area defined by populated postcodes) along with Invergowrie on the west side of the city, which similarly to Monifieth was previously administered as part of Dundee but is now in another local authority area: Perth and Kinross.

== Economy ==
Monifieth's proximity to Dundee is a key feature of its economy. Approximately 40% of working age residents commute to Dundee for work or to study.

Monifieth has a small retail and leisure complex to the north of the town at Ethiebeaton, which comprises a garden centre, a gym and a fast food outlet. There is also a shopping area centred around the high street, which has a variety of businesses.

Tourism plays a small but significant role in Monifieth's economy and has benefited from the area's associations with golf. Monifieth Golf Links is used as a qualifying course for the Open Championship, which returned to nearby Carnoustie in 2007. The golf links is included in the Carnoustie Country golf marketing campaign, which is funded by Angus Council to promote golf in the area. Monifieth is served by a number of small hotels within the town, as well as larger hotels at Monifieth Farm at the Ethiebeaton retail park and at Forbes of Kingennie to the north of the town.

== Landmarks ==
To the west side of the town there is the Dighty Water. It begins in the Sidlaw Hills and runs 15 miles east-southeast where it meets the Firth of Tay. At least two mills are known to have existed beside the burn: the Milton Mill and the Balmossie Mill. The Milton Mill, which opened in 1788 as a flax spinning mill, was part of the Milton industrial area. It was the oldest water-powered flax mill in Angus. The mill, which was a category B listed building, suffered significant fire damage in June 2006. Initially, the mill was not permitted to be demolished but, in April 2010, it was agreed by the Angus Development Standards Committee that the building was "beyond saving" and demolition was permitted. Demolition of surrounding buildings was already under way, clearing the way for a housing development.

The Balmossie Mill, the smaller of the two mills, was a water mill. Remains of a water wheel and machinery is evident. The exact date of the building is unknown but in 1692 two local men were recorded by local newspapers for poaching. The Balmossie Mill is a category B listed building.

Continuing eastwards from the Milton Mill, along Ferry Road and Maule Street towards the town centre, Monifieth's war memorial is situated. The memorial was dedicated in 1921 and was built by Charles Soutar. The design includes a sculpture of an angel warrior figure with a sword and laurel wreath. Invertay House, located further along Maule Street on the south side of the road, was built in 1878 and opened as Monifieth Public School. Today, the building houses offices. Opposite Invertay House, on the north side of the road, is the Gerard Hall. The hall was built in 1882 for Sunday School pupils of the adjacent St Rule's Parish Church.

== Transport ==
=== Road ===
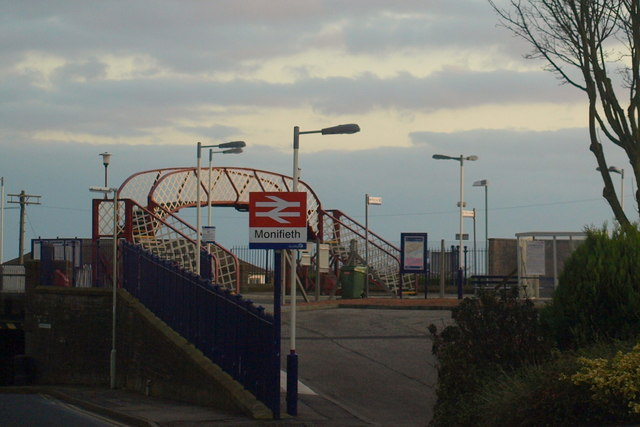
Monifieth railway station

The A92 runs between Arbroath and Dundee immediately to the north of Monifieth. There are several ways to reach the A92, including: the B962, which links to the A92 at the Ardestie junction; Victoria Street, which links to the A92 at the Ethiebeaton Park roundabout; and via the West Grange Road roundabout. The other main road route from Monifieth is the A930, which leads westwards to Dundee via Barnhill and Broughty Ferry and eastwards to Carnoustie, and is named Ferry Road, Maule Street, High Street and Panmure Street.

=== Public transport ===
Trains are operated by ScotRail on the Edinburgh to Aberdeen line. From 2018, Transport Scotland have funded an increased, hourly service from the station to Edinburgh (via Dundee) & Arbroath.

Buses are operated by Stagecoach Strathtay, numbered the 73, 73A, 73B, 73C, 74, 74A, 74B and 74C. They operate on a regular basis to Arbroath, Carnoustie, Broughty Ferry, Dundee, Hawkhill and Ninewells. The less frequent Moffat & Williamson 78 and 79 services go on towards Monikie or Dundee from Monifieth. There is also a one-bus-a-day service 181/A which runs from Muirdrum to Forfar via Monifieth on weekdays, operated by JP MInicoaches.

Many more buses run from the top of Monifieth at Ethiebeaton Park. The buses that serve Ethiebeaton are Stagecoach Strathtay's X7 Coastrider, which runs from Dundee to Aberdeen via Arbroath and Montrose, Stagecoach Strathtay's 72 from Arbroath to Ninewells Hospital and the already mentioned 74/A/B/C, 78/79 and 181/181A.

=== Active transport ===
Monifieth is on National Cycle Route 1. In 2024, a new dedicated path was opened between the town and Broughty Ferry.

== Education ==
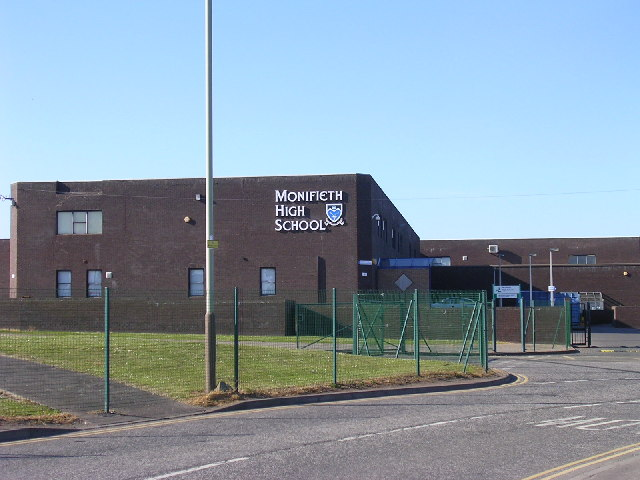
Monifieth High School

There are currently two primary schools located in Monifieth and one secondary school. The schools are Grange Primary School, Seaview Primary School and Monifieth High School. In the 1950s, Monifieth High School, then known affectionately as "The Big School" was located at the crossover from Maul St to the High St. It presently houses the offices of the Invertay School Board/District. Between them, they have approximately 1700 pupils. Seaview Primary School was initially located in a mansion that was donated to the County of Angus and through the 1950s was the only primary school in Monifieth. The headmistress at that time was a Miss Booth. The old mansion (as of September 2011) has yet to be torn down and sits derelict in a position just east of the existing Seaview Primary School with all its windows boarded up. The once well manicured grounds where pupils used to play now lie overgrown with weeds. The old school had 342 pupils and 19 teachers (as of September 2007).

Monifieth High School was founded in 1976 and has a catchment area of Monifieth, Birkhill and other rural areas of Angus including Newbigging. During the school's thirty-three years, there have only been three headteachers. Many of the school's facilities have just recently been renovated, including new windows and several extensions. A new "community wing" has been planned for the school to allow the local community to become more involved in school life.

== Sport and leisure ==
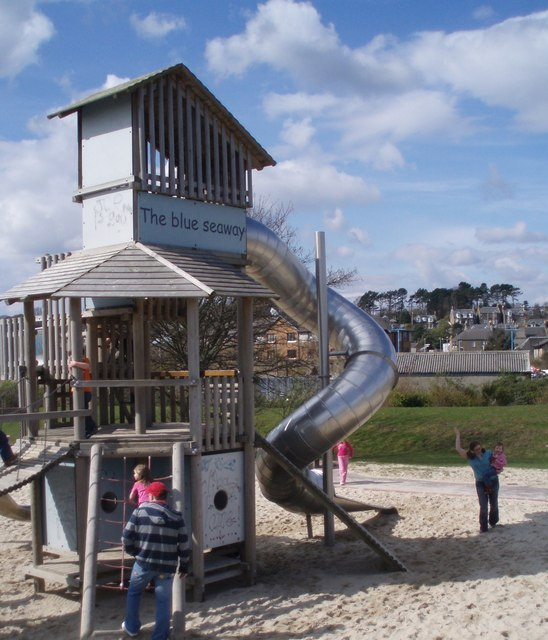
The Blue Seaway

Monifieth has two golf courses, The Medal and The Ashludie. The Medal course was used as a qualifying course for the Open Championship in 2007. There are four golf clubs in the area – Broughty Golf Club, Grange, the Ladies Panmure, and Monifieth.

Monifieth Athletic is a football club that plays in the Dundee and District Youth Football Association with players up to the age of 16. They play at Riverside Park in Monifieth.

Monifieth Tayside FC are an amateur football club that play their home matches at Riverview in Monifieth. The club has both a 1st and a 2nd team that are affiliated to the Midlands Amateur Football Association. The teams play in yellow shirts and green shorts, or alternatively green shirts and black shorts. The club is sponsored by local Monifieth pub, The Vault.

Monifieth Triathlon Club, known as M3 is an amateur club based in the Monifieth area. It was established in 2010 and is affiliated to Triathlon Scotland. It hosts the annual Monikie Open Water Sprint Triathlon at Monikie Country Park.

The Blue Seaway is a development on the seafront that was opened in 2003 at a cost of £800,000. It incorporates an adventure playground, skate park, putting green and tennis courts.

== Public services ==
Monifieth and the surrounding area is supplied with water by Scottish Water. Water was supplied from Crombie reservoir until 1981. Since then, along with Dundee and parts of Perthshire, Angus has been supplied from Lintrathen and Backwater reservoirs in Glen Isla. Electricity distribution is by Scottish Hydro Electric plc, part of the Scottish and Southern Energy group.

Waste management is handled by Angus Council. There is a kerbside recycling scheme that has been in operation since May 2006. Cans, glass, paper and plastic bottles are collected on a weekly basis. Compostable material and non-recyclable material are collected on alternate weeks. Roughly two-thirds of non-recyclable material is sent to landfill at Angus Council's site at Lochhead, Forfar and the remainder sent for incineration (with energy recovery) outside the council area.

Healthcare is supplied in the area by NHS Tayside. The nearest hospitals with accident and emergency departments are Arbroath Infirmary and Ninewells Hospital, Dundee. Primary Health Care in Monifieth is supplied by Monifieth Medical Practice which is based at the Health Centre on Victoria Street; Monifieth along with the rest of Scotland is served by the Scottish Ambulance Service.

Law enforcement is provided by Tayside Police, and Monifieth is served by Tayside Fire and Rescue Service.

== Notable people ==
- Thomas Martin Cappon (1863–1939), architect
- Professor William Fisher Cassie (1905–1985)
- Tom Simpson (born 1972), musician

== Twin town ==
Monifieth is twinned with:

- Soyaux, Charente, France (since 1994)
