= Inverpeffer =

Coordinates: 56.531399°N 2.653524°W

Inverpeffer: Scottish Gaelic: Inbhir Pheofhair
- Location within Angus
- OS grid reference: NO599379
- Council area: Angus
- Lieutenancy area: Angus
- Country: Scotland
- Sovereign state: United Kingdom
- Police: Scotland
- Fire: Scottish
- Ambulance: Scottish

Inverpeffer (Scottish Gaelic: Inbhir Pheofhair, lit. 'Mouth of the shining/beautiful stream') was a hamlet that once existed in Angus, Scotland until around 1941, when it was demolished during the building of East Haven airfield.

David of Inverpeffer was one of the signatories to the Performance of Fealty to Edward I, signed in August 1296 at Berwick upon Tweed.

It was on a return journey from Inverpeffer to Barry in 1797 that loomwright Thomas Lowson fell asleep in grassland belonging to Major William Phillips. Lowson, enamoured of the area, approached Phillips, securing a feu of land, and built the first house in the village that was to become Carnoustie.

Today, a single building from the former hamlet remains.
