= Woodhill, Angus =

Coordinates: 56.500095°N 2.784565°W

Woodhill
- Location within Angus
- OS grid reference: NO518345
- Council area: Angus
- Lieutenancy area: Angus
- Country: Scotland
- Sovereign state: United Kingdom
- Post town: CARNOUSTIE
- Postcode district: DD7
- Dialling code: 01241
- Police: Scotland
- Fire: Scottish
- Ambulance: Scottish

Woodhill is a settlement in Angus, Scotland. It lies at a central point between Carnoustie and Monifieth on the east on an unclassified road linking the A92 and A930 roads. Woodhill House was erected in 1604 by William Auchinleck, who later became Provost of Dundee. It was demolished and rebuilt in 1908.

The area has been occupied since the Neolithic period, as evidenced by a Cursus monument, identified from cropmarks, as well as Bronze Age short cist burials that are found periodically.

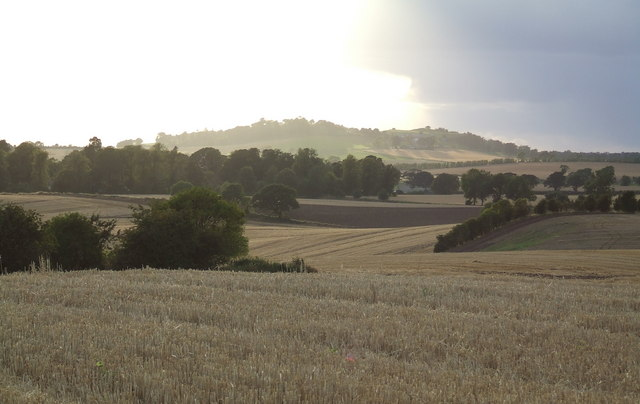
Agricultural land between Woodhill and Grange of Barry, looking towards Laws Hill

== See also ==
- Carnoustie
