= Hunter's Town, Angus =

Coordinates: 56.500431°N 2.729340°W

Hunter's Town
- Location within Angus
- OS grid reference: NO552345
- Council area: Angus
- Lieutenancy area: Angus
- Country: Scotland
- Sovereign state: United Kingdom
- Police: Scotland
- Fire: Scottish
- Ambulance: Scottish

Hunter's Town was a hamlet that once existed in Angus, Scotland, between Barry and Carnoustie. Urban growth in the latter part of the nineteenth century and early twentieth century gradually led to Hunter's Town becoming subsumed into the town of Carnoustie.

The location of Hunter's Town can be seen on the first edition Ordnance Survey map (6 inches to one mile) of 1865. The buildings that once comprised the hamlet can be found today on Barry Road, Carnoustie around the junction with Lochend Road.
