= Carlogie =

Coordinates: 56.513074°N 2.718208°W

- Location within Angus
- OS grid reference: NO559359
- Council area: Angus
- Lieutenancy area: Angus
- Country: Scotland
- Sovereign state: United Kingdom
- Post town: CARNOUSTIE
- Postcode district: DD7
- Dialling code: 01241
- Police: Scotland
- Fire: Scottish
- Ambulance: Scottish
- UK Parliament: Dundee East
- Scottish Parliament: Angus South

Carlogie is a hamlet in Angus, Scotland. It lies approximately half a mile north of Carnoustie on the A930 road. Carlogie House was erected in 1854 as the residence of the factor of Panmure Estate. It was converted into a hotel in the 1960s by James Robson. Planning consent was granted to convert it into residential housing in 2007.

Archaeological excavations at Carlogie prior to the A92 road improvements (1998–2000) revealed pottery fragments that were tentatively dated to the Late Neolithic period.

== See also ==
- Carnoustie
