= Clayholes =

Hamlet in Angus, Scotland

Coordinates: 56.509424°N 2.727888°W

- Location within Angus
- OS grid reference: NO553355
- Council area: Angus
- Lieutenancy area: Angus
- Country: Scotland
- Sovereign state: United Kingdom
- Post town: CARNOUSTIE
- Postcode district: DD7
- Dialling code: 01241
- Police: Scotland
- Fire: Scottish
- Ambulance: Scottish
- UK Parliament: Dundee East
- Scottish Parliament: Angus; North East Scotland

Clayholes is a small hamlet in Angus, Scotland. It lies approximately 0.5 kilometres (0.31 mi) north of Carnoustie on the unclassified Balmachie road, that connects the A930 road in Carnoustie with the A92 road at Balmachie.

The settlement is not present on the earliest detailed maps available for the area, but can be seen for example on Ainslie's map of 1794. The site, however, appears to have been settled in pre-modern times, as evidenced by archaeology found in the immediate vicinity.

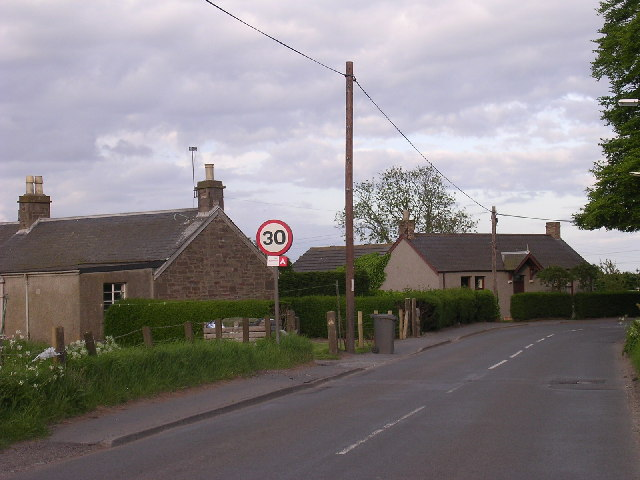
Clayholes

== See also ==
- Carnoustie
