= Gardynebourg =

Coordinates: 56.498615°N 2.732554°W

- Location within Angus
- OS grid reference: NO550343
- Council area: Angus
- Lieutenancy area: Angus
- Country: Scotland
- Sovereign state: United Kingdom
- Police: Scotland
- Fire: Scottish
- Ambulance: Scottish

Gardynebourg was a hamlet that once existed in Angus, Scotland, between Barry and Carnoustie. Urban growth in the latter part of the nineteenth century and early twentieth century gradually led to Gardynebourg becoming subsumed into the town of Carnoustie.

The location of Gardynebourg can be seen on the first edition Ordnance Survey map (6 inches to one mile) of 1865. The buildings that once comprised the hamlet can be found today in the locality of Thomas Street, Carnoustie.
