= Muirdrum =

Coordinates: 56.524790°N 2.711928°W

Muirdrum: Scots: Muirdrum
- Location within Angus
- OS grid reference: NO563372
  - Edinburgh: 43 mi (69 km) SSW
  - London: 368 mi (592 km) SSE
- Council area: Angus
- Lieutenancy area: Angus
- Country: Scotland
- Sovereign state: United Kingdom
- Post town: CARNOUSTIE
- Postcode district: DD7
- Dialling code: 01241
- Police: Scotland
- Fire: Scottish
- Ambulance: Scottish
- UK Parliament: Dundee East
- Scottish Parliament: Angus; North East Scotland

Muirdrum (/mjʊərˈdrʌm/) is a small village in the council area of Angus, Scotland. It is situated at the junction of the old A92 road from Dundee to Arbroath, the A930 to Carnoustie and B9128 to Forfar. Its closest town is Carnoustie, which lies approximately 2 km (1 mi) to the south.

The village is mentioned in the list of lands purchased by George Maule, 2nd Earl of Panmure in 1667. These lands were forfeited by his heir, James Maule, 4th Earl of Panmure following the Jacobite rising of 1715. The opening of the Dundee to Arbroath turnpike road (later designated the A92 road) at the beginning of the 19th century lead to some expansion along this road.

From Muirdrum, services 73B and 73C run to Carnoustie, Monifieth, Broughty Ferry, Dundee and Ninewells Hospital. There is also a one-bus-a-day service 181/A which runs from Muirdrum to Forfar via Carnoustie and Monifieth on weekdays, operated by JP MInicoaches.

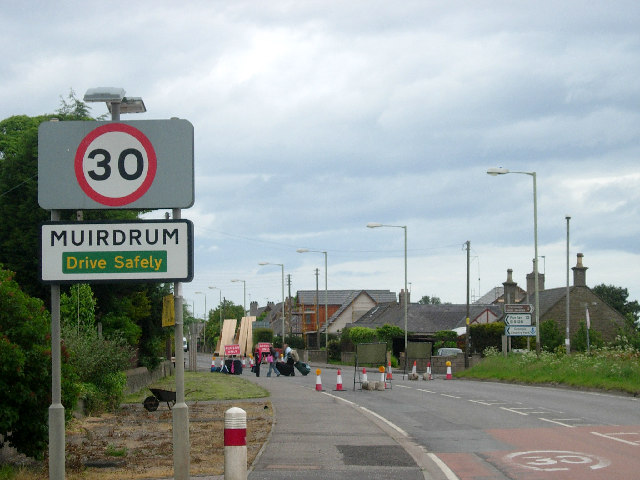
Muirdrum (during A92 upgrade)

== See also ==
- List of places in Angus
- Carnoustie
