= Thomas Lowson =

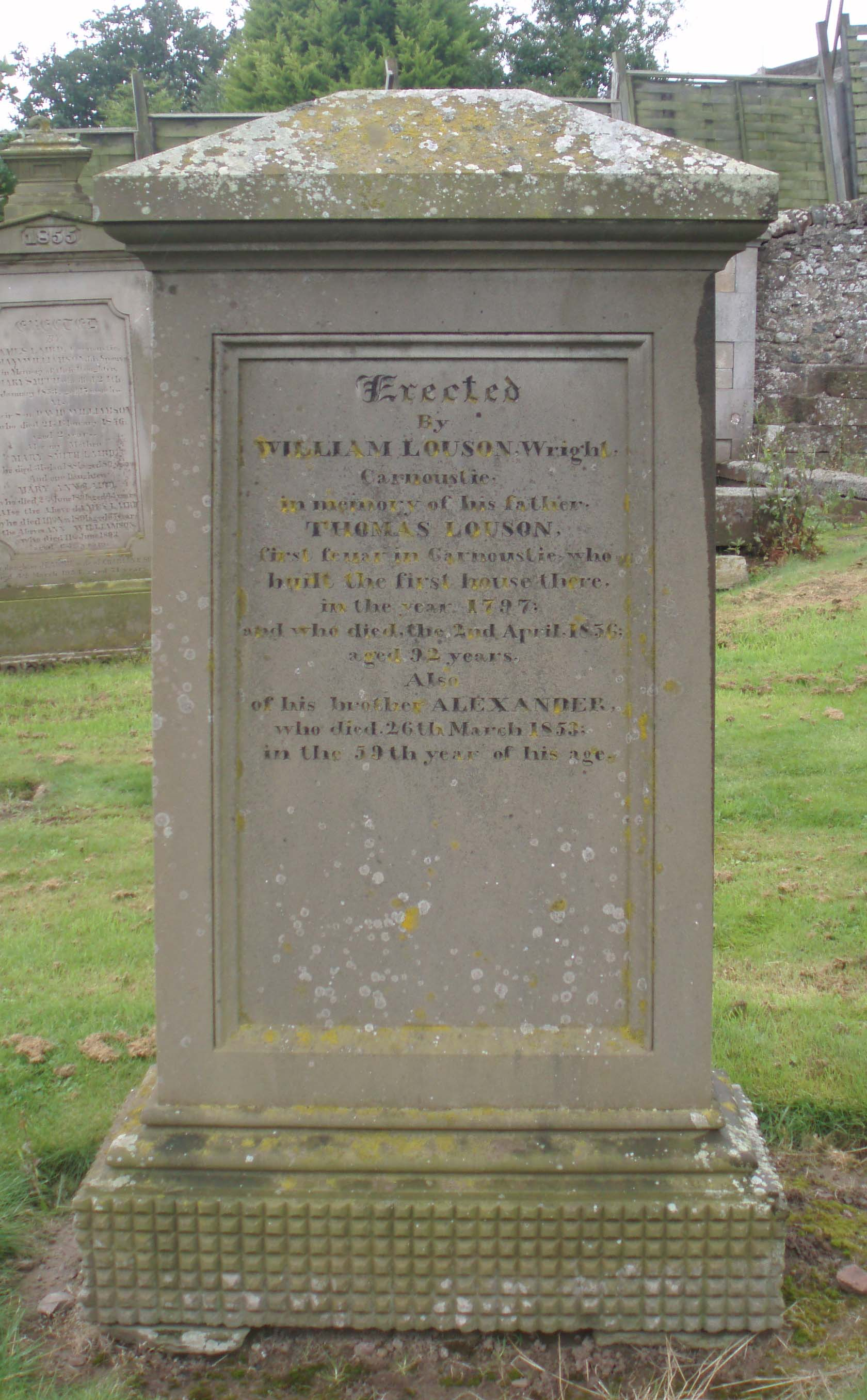
- Thomas Lowson's grave, Barry kirkyard
- Born: c.1764 Barry, Angus, Scotland.
- Died: April 2, 1856 (aged 91–92); Carnoustie, Angus, Scotland.
- Other names: Tammas Lousen
- Occupation: Loom wright
- Known for: Founder of Carnoustie

Thomas Lowson (Scots: Tammas Lousen; c. 1764–1856) is traditionally thought to be the founder of the town of Carnoustie, Angus.

== Biography ==
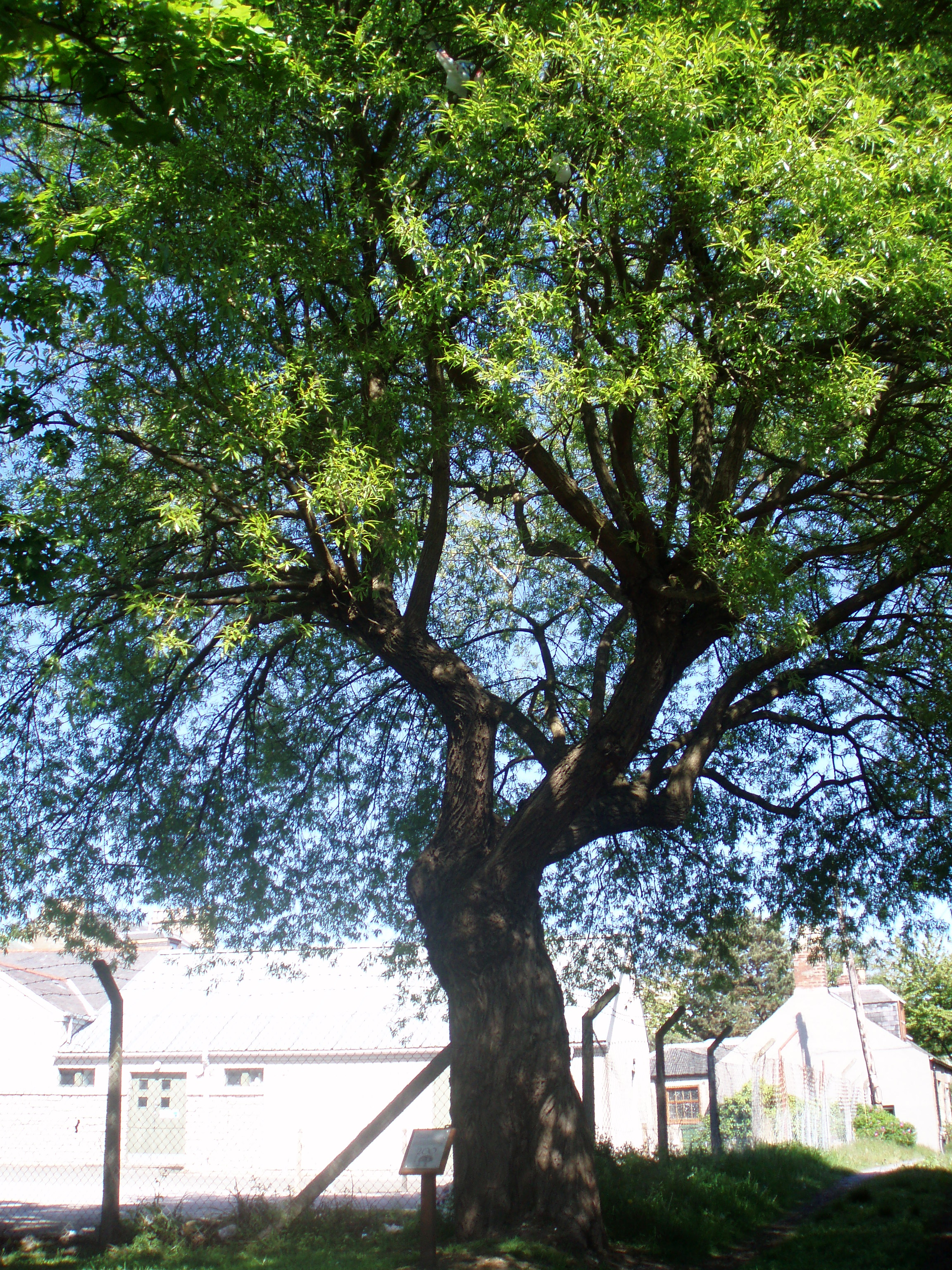
Thomas Lowson's Dibble Tree

In the late 18th century Charles Gardyne, Freeholder of Ravensby, (or possibly David Gardyne, his elder brother) marked out a road between the villages of Barry and West Haven, using a four horse plough, passing along its way the Point Inn, which stood immediately behind where the Municipal Buildings were built in 1896, opposite Carnoustie Library.

It was along this new road that Thomas Lowson, a loom wright who lived in Barry, was returning home one day in 1797 from a trip to Inverpeffer. After passing the Point Inn, some say stopping there a while, he took a rest and slept for a while, and upon waking feeling especially refreshed, decided to approach the owner of the land, Major William Phillips, and ask to rent a small area of land. Phillips, the former valet of Panmure estate, bought Carnoustie estate from Bailie Milne in 1792 for the price of £5,000 on his return from India, renaming it 'Taymouth'. Phillips was surprised by Lowson's request, as the land was thought to be agronomically poor, but granted Lowson the first feu of 2 acres (8,100 m^{2}) of land for seventy shillings. On hearing about it, Phillips' wife took pity on the apparently deluded Lowson and refunded him five shillings.

In 1798, while transplanting cabbage seedlings on his new land, Lowson left the willow dibble stick he had been using stuck in the ground. He later found it had sprouted leaves. The 'Dibble Tree', a magnificent specimen of Crack Willow (Salix fragilis) can still be seen, off Ferrier Street, and was listed as one of the hundred Treefest Heritage Trees of Scotland in 2006.

Lowson proved his detractors wrong and enjoyed so much success on his land in his first year that a number of his friends applied for feus in the following years. Carnoustie, as the town came to be known, grew over the next few decades such that there were more than a thousand inhabitants 50 years later.

Lowson was married to Barbara Stewart. There is an entry on the Barry Parish Records for July 19, 1799 for the birth of his son, William, where the address is listed as 'Taymouth'. He can be seen on both the 1841 census, where his occupation is listed as 'carpenter', and the 1851 census, where he is listed simply as the 'First Ferth in Carnoustie'. Lowson died in 1856 at the age of 92, and was interred at Barry Parish Church cemetery. His original thatched cottage was improved extensively in the 19th century by his son William and can still be seen on the south side of Dundee Street, not far to the west of The Cross, where it still bears the name 'First Feu Cottage'.
