= A930 road =

Road in Scotland

Coordinates: 56.488344°N 2.795690°W

A930

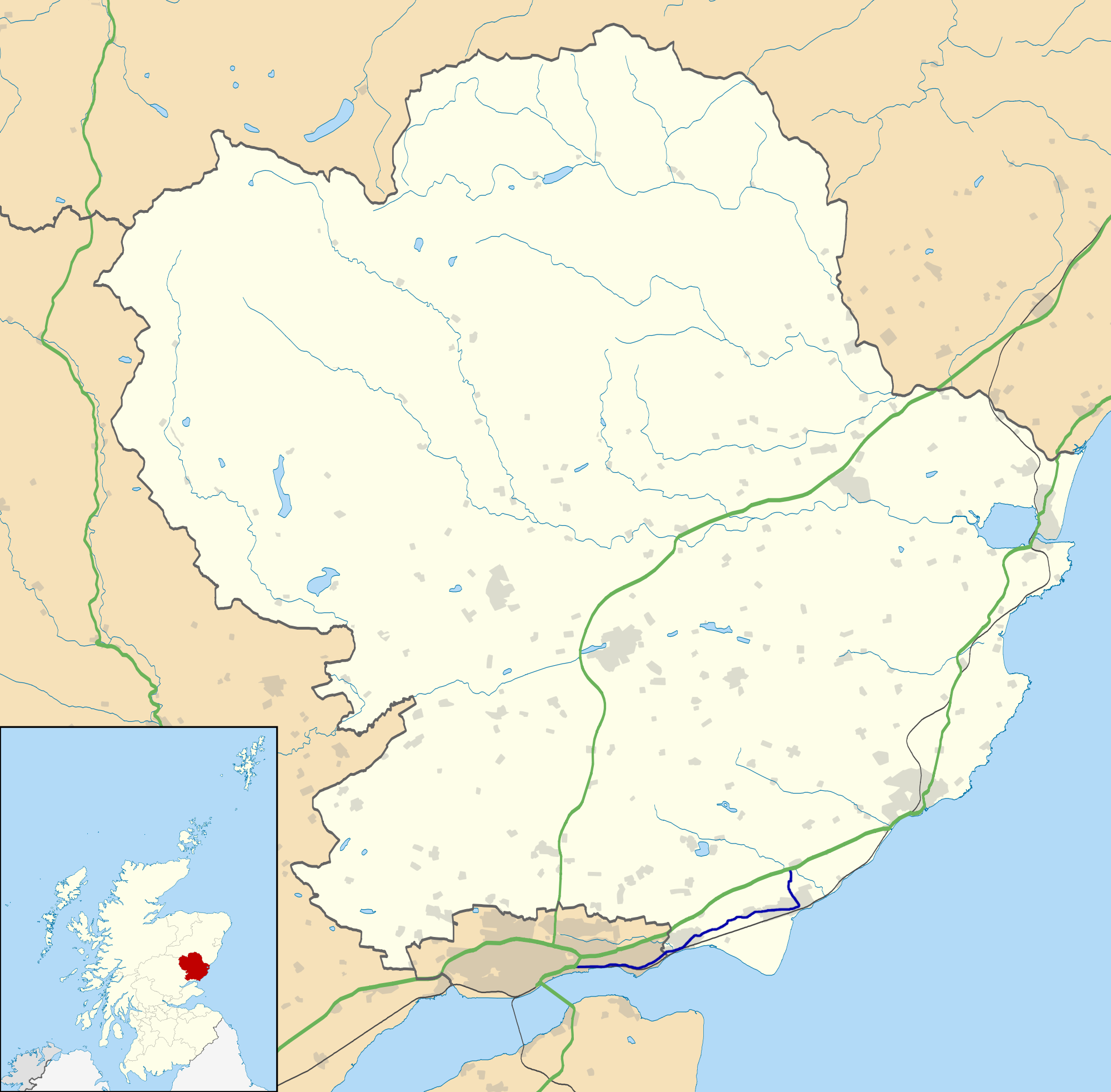

Major junctions
- West end: A92, Dundee
- East end: A92, Muirdrum

Location
- Country: United Kingdom
- Constituent country: Scotland

Road network
- Roads in the United Kingdom; Motorways; A and B road zones

The A930 is a single carriageway road in Angus, Scotland. It runs from Dundee to Carnoustie.

Starting at its junction with the A92 road in Craigie, Dundee, it runs east through West Ferry, Broughty Ferry, Barnhill and Monifieth. It then passes through countryside north of the Buddon Ness, past Barry (through which it passed until 2003 on the construction of the bypass), to Carnoustie. It forms the main thoroughfare in Carnoustie and turns north at the eastern end of the town, heading north towards Muirdrum. The road is a single carriageway along its entire length.
