= Carnoustie =

Town in Angus, Scotland

Coordinates: 56.501°N 2.710°W

Carnoustie: Scottish Gaelic: Càrn Ùstaidh
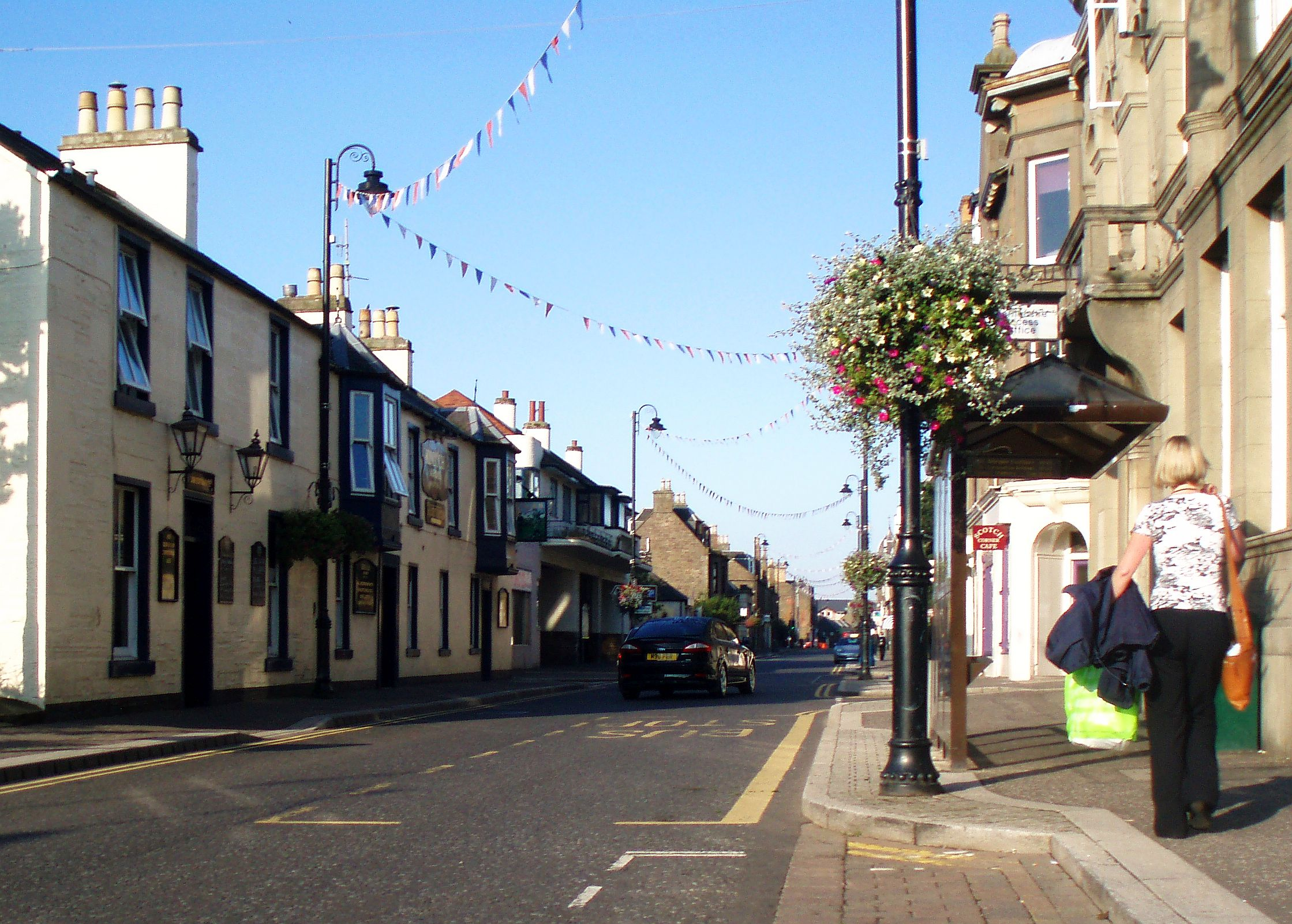
- Carnoustie High Street

- Location within Angus
- Population: 11,359 (2022)
- Demonym: Carnoustian
- OS grid reference: NO561345
  - Edinburgh: 42 mi (68 km) SSW
  - London: 367 mi (591 km) SSE
- Council area: Angus
- Lieutenancy area: Angus
- Country: Scotland
- Sovereign state: United Kingdom
- Post town: CARNOUSTIE
- Postcode district: DD7
- Dialling code: 01241
- Police: Scotland
- Fire: Scottish
- Ambulance: Scottish
- UK Parliament: Arbroath and Broughty Ferry
- Scottish Parliament: Angus South

Carnoustie (/kɑːrˈnuːsti/; Scottish Gaelic: Càrn Ùstaidh) is a seaside town and former police burgh in the council area of Angus, Scotland. It is at the mouth of the Barry Burn on the North Sea coast. In 2022, Carnoustie had a population of 11,359, making it the fourth-largest town in Angus. The town was founded in the late 18th century, and grew rapidly throughout the 19th century due to the growth of the local textile industry. It was popular as a tourist resort from the early Victorian era up to the latter half of the 20th century, due to its seaside location, and is best known for the Carnoustie Golf Links course that often hosts the Open Championship.

Carnoustie can be considered a dormitory town for its nearest city, Dundee, which is 11 miles (18 kilometres) to the west. It is served principally by Carnoustie railway station, and also by Golf Street railway station. Its nearest major road is the A92, north of the town.

== History ==
=== Toponymy ===
"Karnousty" as depicted on Timothy Pont's map c. 1583–1596.

Carnoustie's name is of uncertain origin. The first element has been linked to a variety of Gaelic words, including cathair (fort), càrr (stone), and carn (cairn), but the second has eluded interpretation. Càrn Ùstaidh, the name used by Ainmean-Àite na h-Alba, is merely a Gaelicized form of the English name. A popular theory interprets the name as "craws' nestie", in reference to the large number of crows and rooks which once built their nests here, and the burgh seal displays a tree surrounded by crows in allusion to this.

Whatever its origin, the name predates the town itself by several hundred years. It first appears as "Carnowis" in a charter issued by James IV to the Earl of Angus in 1510. "Carnussie" farm is recorded in the Balmerino Abbey register of c. 1575, which states that it (along with part of Grange of Barry and Badiehill) was feued to the Fairny family and "Karnousty" farm can be seen on Pont's map of Lower Angus, c. 1583––1596. The town is seen as "Carnowstie" in a deed of sale from 1595, "Carnushie" appears in a tax roll from Balmerino Abbey in 1617, and the lands of "Carnouslie" are referred to in the title deeds confirming its purchase by the Earl of Panmure in 1672. Adair is perhaps the first to depict Carnoustie with the current spelling in 1703, while Roy's military survey of Scotland, 1747–55 has it as "Cornisty". In Webster's Topographical Dictionary of Scotland (1819), Carnoustie is mentioned as "Carnuistie".

=== Early history ===
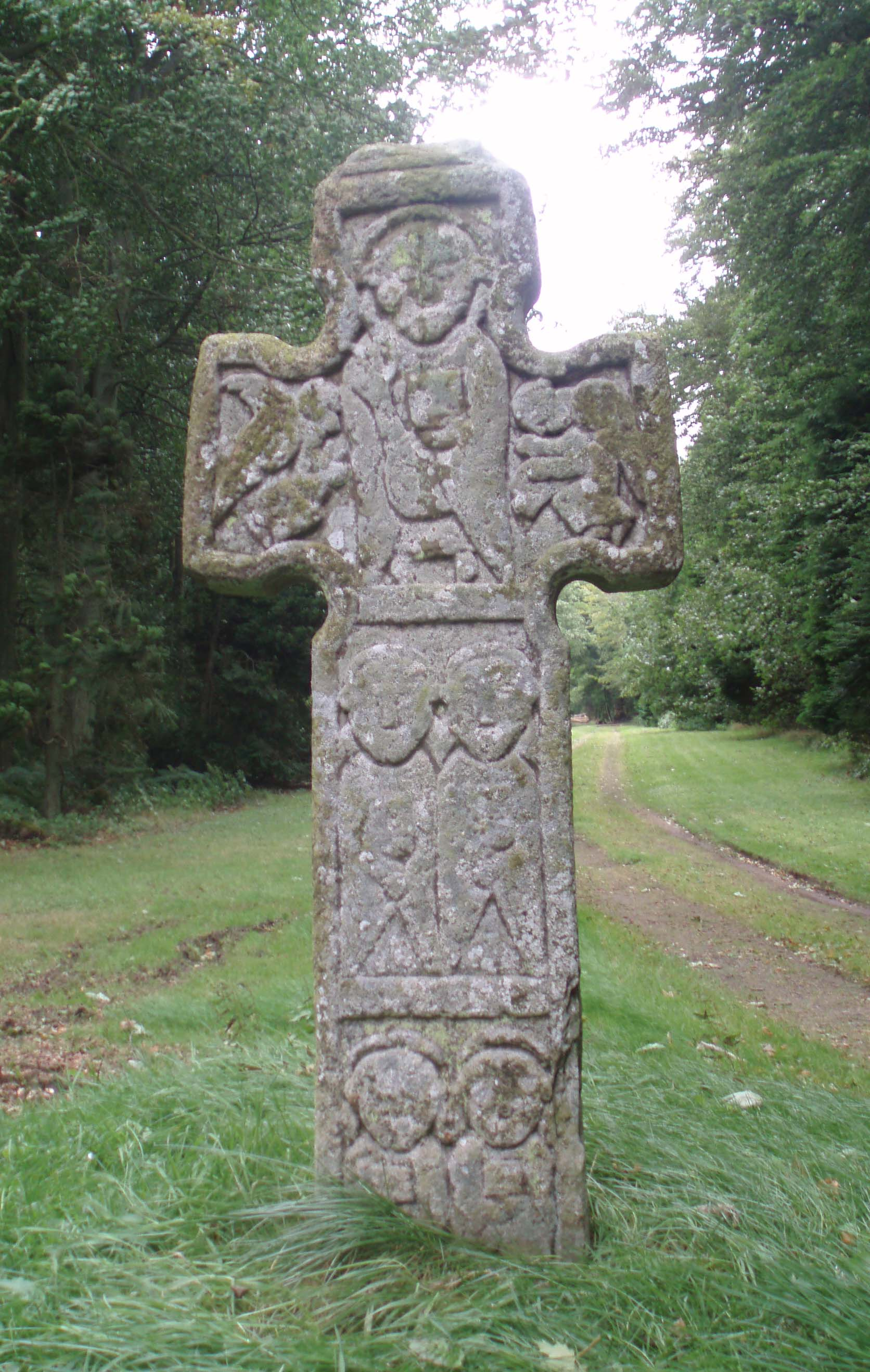
Camus Stone

The area surrounding Carnoustie has been occupied continuously since the Neolithic period, as evidenced by a Cursus monument, identified from cropmarks near Woodhill. This cursus is of a similar scale to the well characterised, mid-4th-century BC enclosure found nearby at Douglasmuir near Friockheim. Numerous stones incised with cup and ring marks have also been found in the surrounding area. An assemblage of Late Neolithic pottery fragments found at Carlogie, 1/2 mile (800 metres) north of Carnoustie, has been interpreted as evidence of a settlement of that age in the area.

Bronze Age archaeology is also present in the area. Numerous short cist burials have been found in the area, including one found in 1994 at West Scryne, one mile (1.5 kilometres) northeast of Carnoustie, that was radiocarbon dated to between 1730 and 1450 BC. The presence of Bronze Age round barrows at Craigmill is also indicated by cropmarks. From the Iron Age, perhaps the most prominent remains are of the Dundee Law Hill Fort, with the Iron Age fort at Craigmill Den being less well known. Near to Carnoustie can be found the souterrains at Carlungie and Ardestie, which date from around the 2nd century AD. Several brochs are also found in the area, including the ruins at Drumsturdy and at Craighill. Roman remains are also found in the area. Particularly notable are the temporary marching camps at Kirkbuddo, Marcus and Finavon, and Roman coins have periodically been found nearby.

Pictish remains are to be found in abundance in the surrounding area. Class I sculptured stones from Aberlemno and Strathmartine can be seen in the McManus Galleries in Dundee while the class I Dunnichen Stone is on loan to the Meffan Institute in Forfar. A class I stone can also be seen in situ at Aberlemno, and this stone appears to be a recycled neolithic stone, having cup and ring marks apparent on its side. Class II stones can be seen at Aberlemno and Glamis and a much-misinterpreted class III stone (known locally as the Camus Cross) can be found four miles (six kilometres) north of Carnoustie at Camuston Hill on Panmure Estate. Linked in misinterpretation with the Camus stone is the early Christian Pictish cemetery that was situated to the West of the Lochty burn, in the vicinity of the High Street. The soil in this vicinity is sandy and was prone to wind erosion, and periodically human remains became exposed to the surface prior to the founding of the town. Popular interpretation was that a great battle had taken place at the site, giving rise to the legend of the Battle of Barry.

The medieval period marks the earliest recorded history in the area. Arbroath Abbey was founded by William the Lion and dedicated in 1178 and the earldom of Dundee granted to David, Earl of Huntingdon around 1182 (Dundee later gained Royal Burgh status in 1292 on the coronation of David's heir, John Balliol). Closer to Carnoustie, a number of medieval mottes can be found, including at Old Downie, where the thanage can be traced to Duncan of Downie in 1254, and at Grange of Barry, as well as the ruins of Panmure Castle where, it is said, William the Lion signed the Panmure charter granting the lands of Panmure to Philip de Valognes in 1172. The original castle was destroyed at some point in the Second War of Independence, possibly in 1336.

The Parish of Barry was bestowed to the monks of Balmerino Abbey in Fife by Alexander II in 1230. The monks managed the lands from the Grange of Barry and latterly the land was controlled by the office of the Bailies of Barry, an early holder of this position being Sir Thomas Maule of Panmure in 1511.

A number of feus were granted in the parish around that time, including Ravensby in 1539, Gedhall to David Gardyne in 1541, half of Barry Links and Cowbyres to Walter Cant in 1545 and the other half of the links to Robert Forrester in 1552. A document from around this time details the rent charged for each of the farms in the area, and it is in this that we see the first mention of Carnoustie:

"The two part of Grange of Barrie 10s. land of ye same 9 aikers of badihill. And toun and lands of Carnussie set to ffairny for 25 li. 2s. 24 capons 20 puld."

The land was annexed by the state in the Protestant Reformation following an Act of Parliament in 1587 and the Bailiery of Barry was granted by James VI as a heritable gift to Patrick Maule in 1590. Ownership of the lands was granted by the King to James Elphinstone, Secretary of State in 1599 (ratified 1605), and was sold to George Maule, 2nd Earl of Panmure in 1667 (ratified in 1672) for £746 13s 4d. The land was forfeited following James Maule, 4th Earl of Panmure's involvement in the Jacobite rising of 1715.

The first recorded owners of the Barony of Panbride was the Morham family, whose ancestral name was Malherbe. They are first mentioned in relation to Panbride in the registers of Arbroath Abbey in a charter of John Morham made in the mid-13th century. It is thought that they had possession of the land until 1309 when Robert I conferred the land to his brother in law, Alexander Fraser, Lord Chamberlain of Scotland. Fraser died at the Battle of Dupplin Moor in 1332 and it is thought that David II conferred the barony (at least in part) to the Boyce family in 1341.

The lands of Panbride were fragmented and passed through a number of hands from that point, and were gradually acquired by the Carnegie family, later to become the Earls of Northesk, in the 16th century. The lands were forfeited following the Jacobite rebellion but were bought back by James Carnegie in 1764. Carnegie used the lands to purchase lands near his main estate and the barony of Panbride passed to William Maule, linking Panbride with Panmure.

=== Origin ===
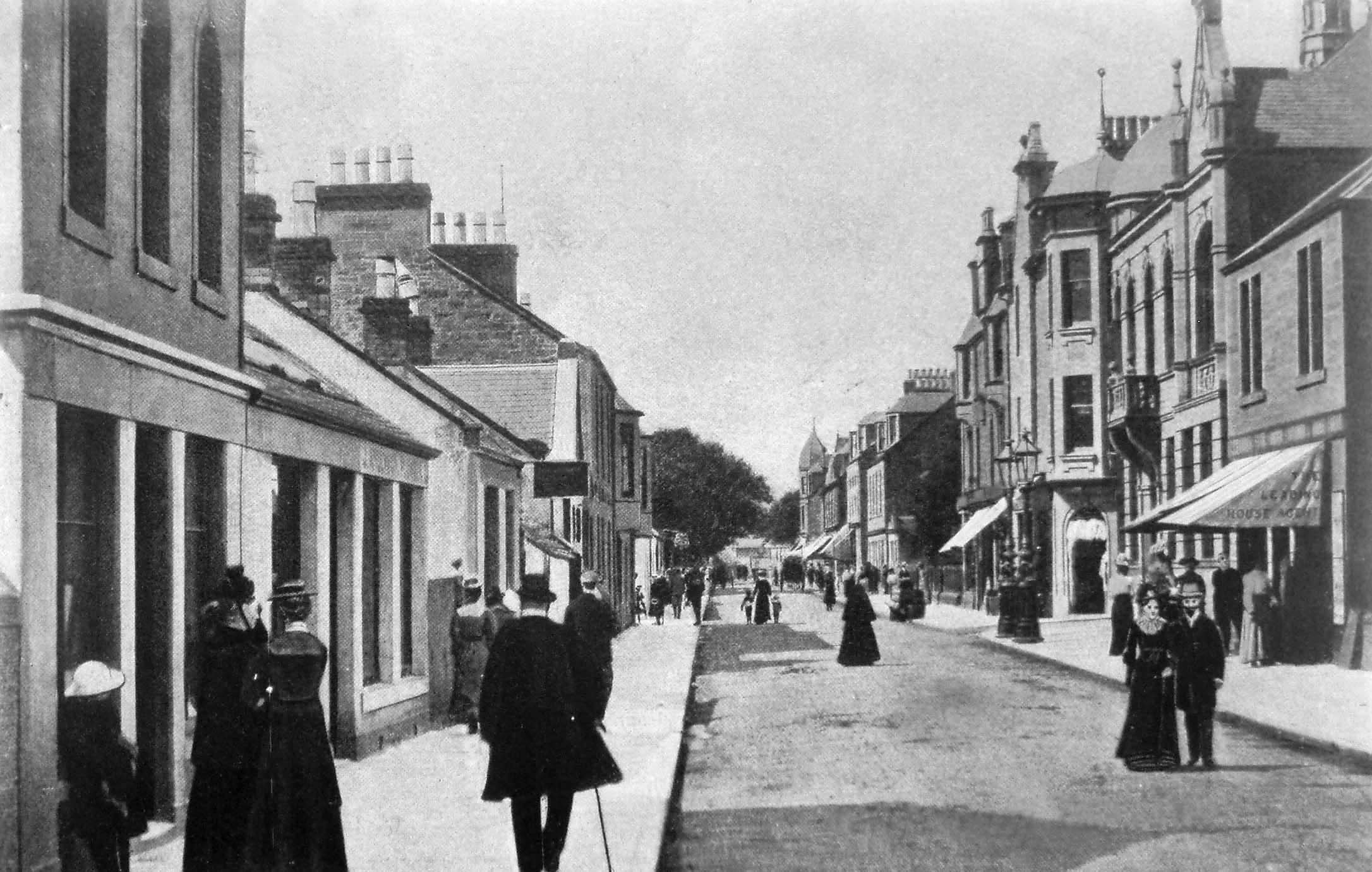
Carnoustie, c. 1900

The lands of Carnoustie remained in the ownership of the Fernie family until the end of the 16th century. In 1595 they had passed into the hands of Mitchell Downie and Margaret Fernie who sold them to Robert Bultie, Burgess of Dundee for the sum of 5,000 merks. They then came into the possession of the Alexander family, probably around the beginning of the 17th century, and documents dating to the middle of that century mention a village of Carnoustie. The estate was then sold to Patrick Lyon of Strathmore around 1680, and remained in that family's ownership, passing through marriage to James Milne, a wealthy shipmaster from Montrose around 1752.

The Barry parish register attests to a small but thriving community based largely on linen weaving existing on the land that became Carnoustie at least from the early 18th century (before then, the place of residence is not listed in the records). Around a fifth of the births registered in the parish in the mid-18th century are listed as being in the Carnoustie estate.

The stimulus that triggered the expansion of the town was undoubtedly the sudden increase in demand for linen from around 1760, caused by the population explosion of the mid-18th century. Handloom weaving was a relatively easy trade to learn and, at that time, a fairly prosperous career. In 1792 on his return from India, Major William Phillips, former valet to the Earl of Panmure, purchased Carnoustie estate from James Milne for £5,000. Phillips most likely recognised the potential of the local industry when he offered portions of the land for feu in 1797.

The first person to take up a feu was Thomas Lowson, a local loom wright, who rented two acres (one hectare) of land near the new road that had been recently been marked out by David Gardyne of Ravensby. Over the next few years, more and more people settled in the immediate area The venture proved profitable and Phillips sold the property in 1808 to George Kinloch for £11,000.

Kinloch promoted the further growth of the village, setting up brickworks and granting loans to prospective feuers to allow them to settle and, by the mid-19th century, the population of the town had risen to more than a thousand. For many years, the village was known simply as 'the Feus'. Perhaps the first cartographic depiction of the town is from a French maritime chart of 1803, where the village is shown as 'Feux', while Thomson's 1832 map of the area shows 'the Feus' as being a number of properties, largely concentrated in the area to the west of the Lochty burn.

=== Industrial history ===
The handloom linen weaving industry dominated Carnoustie's economy through its early years. Flax was grown in considerable quantities in the area and supplemented imports from Riga and St Petersburg. The predominant occupation listed in the 1841 census and 1843 statistical account for Barry Parish is that of "Linen Hand Loom Weaver". The expansion in the linen industry supported a population increase in the Barry Parish from 796 in 1791 to 2,124 by the time of the 1841 census.

Aside from the linen industry, the economy rested mainly on agriculture and fishing. Major crops of that period were cereal and vegetables; much of which was sold on to markets in local towns. Cattle were raised for export to England. Salmon were caught in nets on Carnoustie Beach, and the small fishing fleets of Westhaven and Easthaven caught cod for export and haddock which was largely destined for Dundee and Forfar. Lobsters were caught for live export to London and crabs were caught for local use.

The arrival of the Dundee and Arbroath Railway in 1838 encouraged major industrial growth in the town and shortly after, the Vitriol Works opened near the railway line, on ground to the west of the town, producing sulphuric acid used largely in the production of agricultural fertiliser. The Panbride Bleachfield, at which linen from the expanding local industry was bleached was opened by John Dickson in the early 1840s adjacent to the railway near the mouth of the Craigmill burn on land which is now occupied by David Murray Transport. This was supplied with water from the burn via the ponds that can now be seen in the grounds of Panbride House, now the location of the Liz McColgan Health Club.

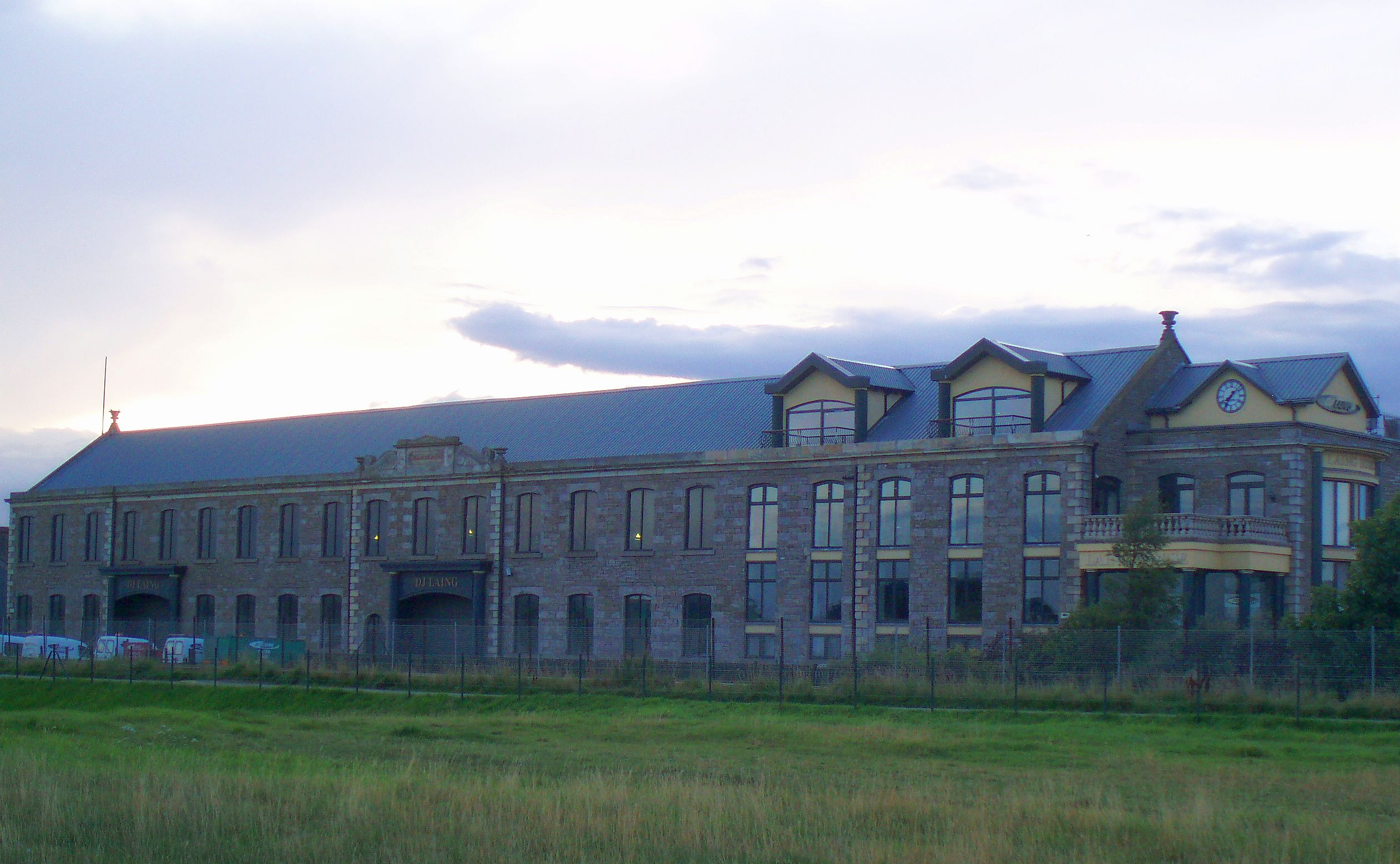
James Smieton's Panmure Works, built 1857. Now housing D.J. Laing

In 1851, shoe maker John Winter opened a shop near The Cross. His business grew such that he built a large factory in 1874 at the foot of East Path (now Park Avenue/Queen Street), employing 200 people and producing 2,000 pairs of shoes and boots a week. His son, George, took over the business and built the impressive mansion, Winterdyne, that overlooks Carnoustie House Grounds at the top of Queen Street. Production ceased in 1958, and the Lousen Park sheltered housing complex was subsequently built at the site.

The linen industry in Carnoustie was modernised in 1857 with the opening of the Panmure Works by James Smieton. This factory, which at its height employed 600 employees, was a state-of-the-art facility containing 400 modern power looms and produced 6 million yards (5.5 megametres) of linen and jute annually. Smieton also built new housing on a number of streets in the surrounding area for his employees and, in 1865, he opened the Panmure Works Institute on Kinloch Street which provided a library, billiards room and a hall for the education and recreation of his workers. The firm went through several changes of ownership through its history and was owned by W. G. Grant & Co Ltd from 1932 until 1972 when it went into liquidation.

The smaller Taymouth Linen works were opened in 1867 to the west of Panmure Works and the Vitriol Works, and at its height contained 100 power looms. Again, additional housing was built by the owners, the Brodies, including Taymouth Terrace. By 1898 Taymouth Works had become home to the business of George Anderson, owner of the Arbroath Foundry. George Anderson & Co. Ltd. produced for example, quarrying equipment such as channelling machines. The business evolved into Anderson-Grice Co. Ltd. which produced a range of mechanical equipment, including the short-lived Dalhousie motor car.

The Annual Reports of the Fishery Board for Scotland provide an insight into fishing in Westhaven in the years before the First World War. In the report for 1909 it was stated that the fishing in Easthaven and Westhaven was "unimportant. Fishermen [were] chiefly employed in salmon and crab fishings.

Fishery Statistics

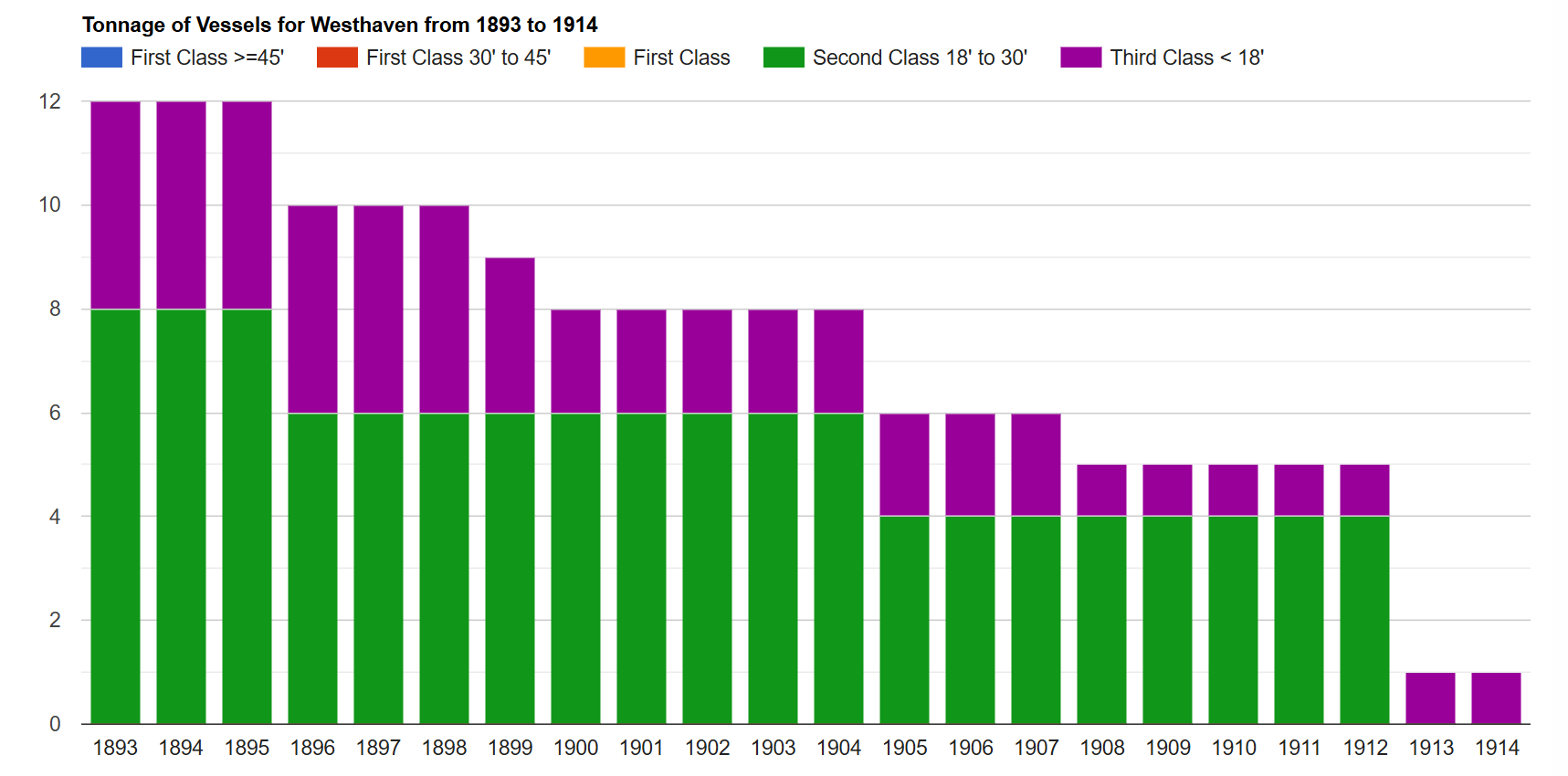
Tonnage of vessels

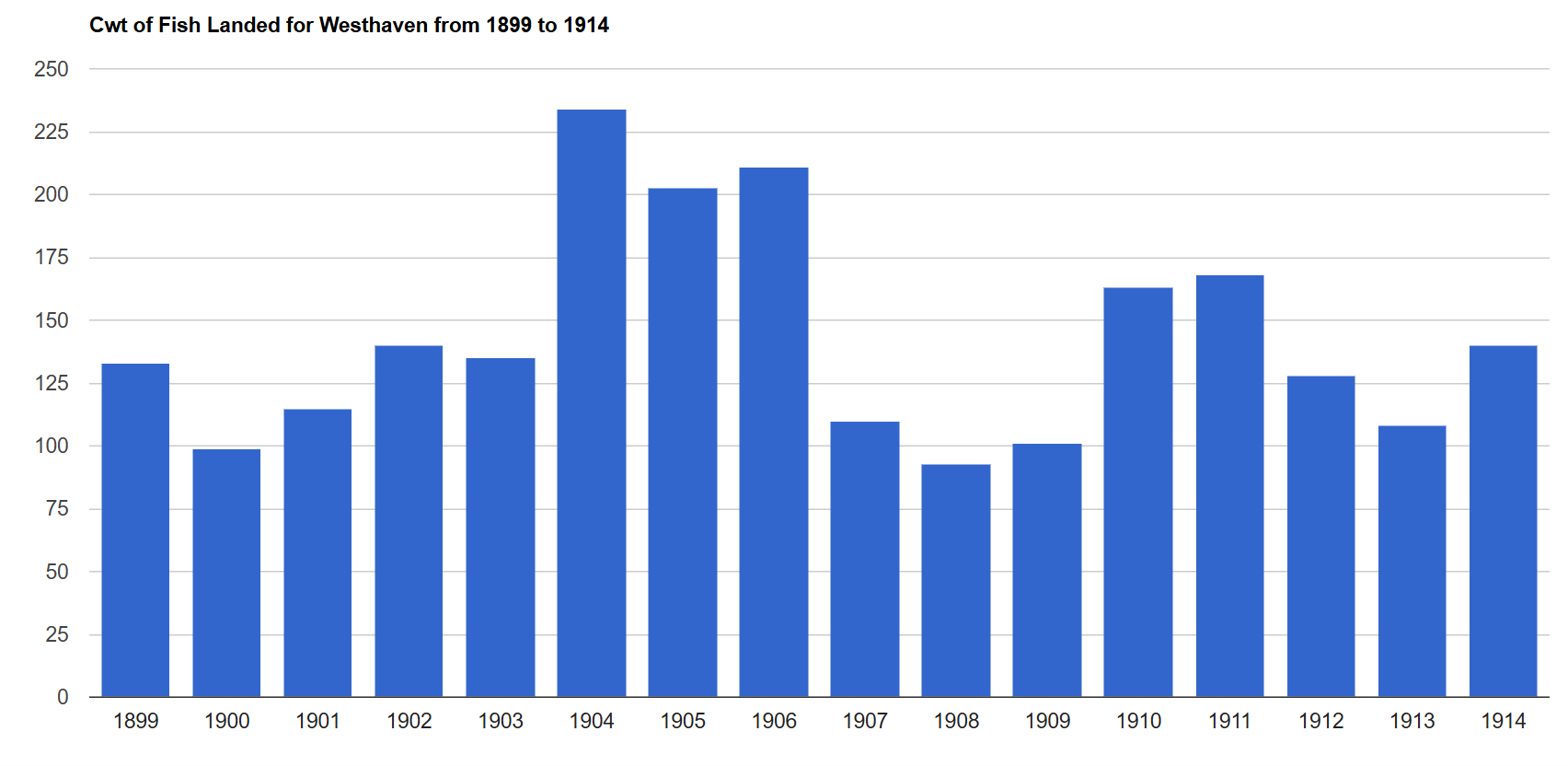
Cwt of fish landed

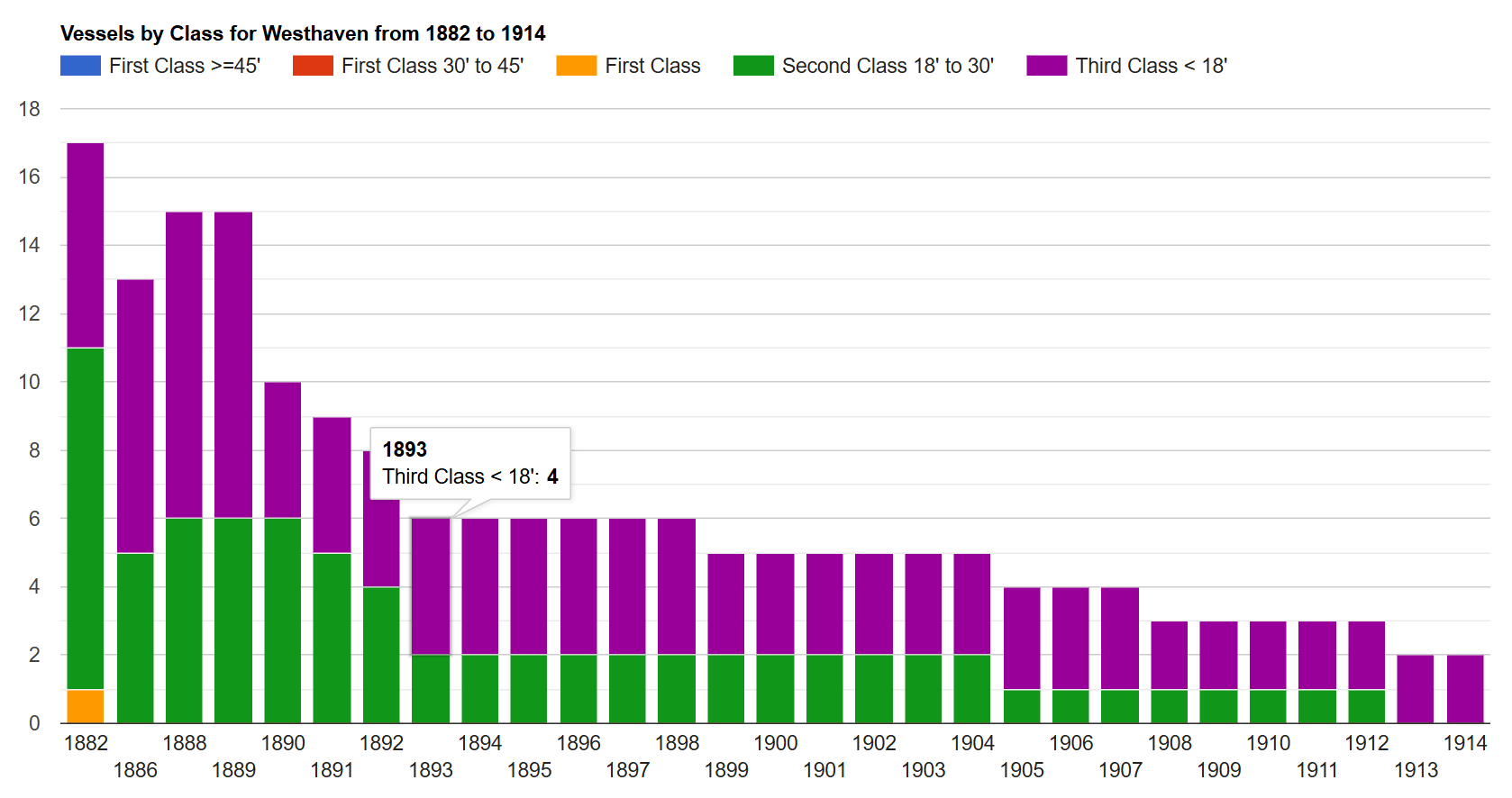
Vessels by class

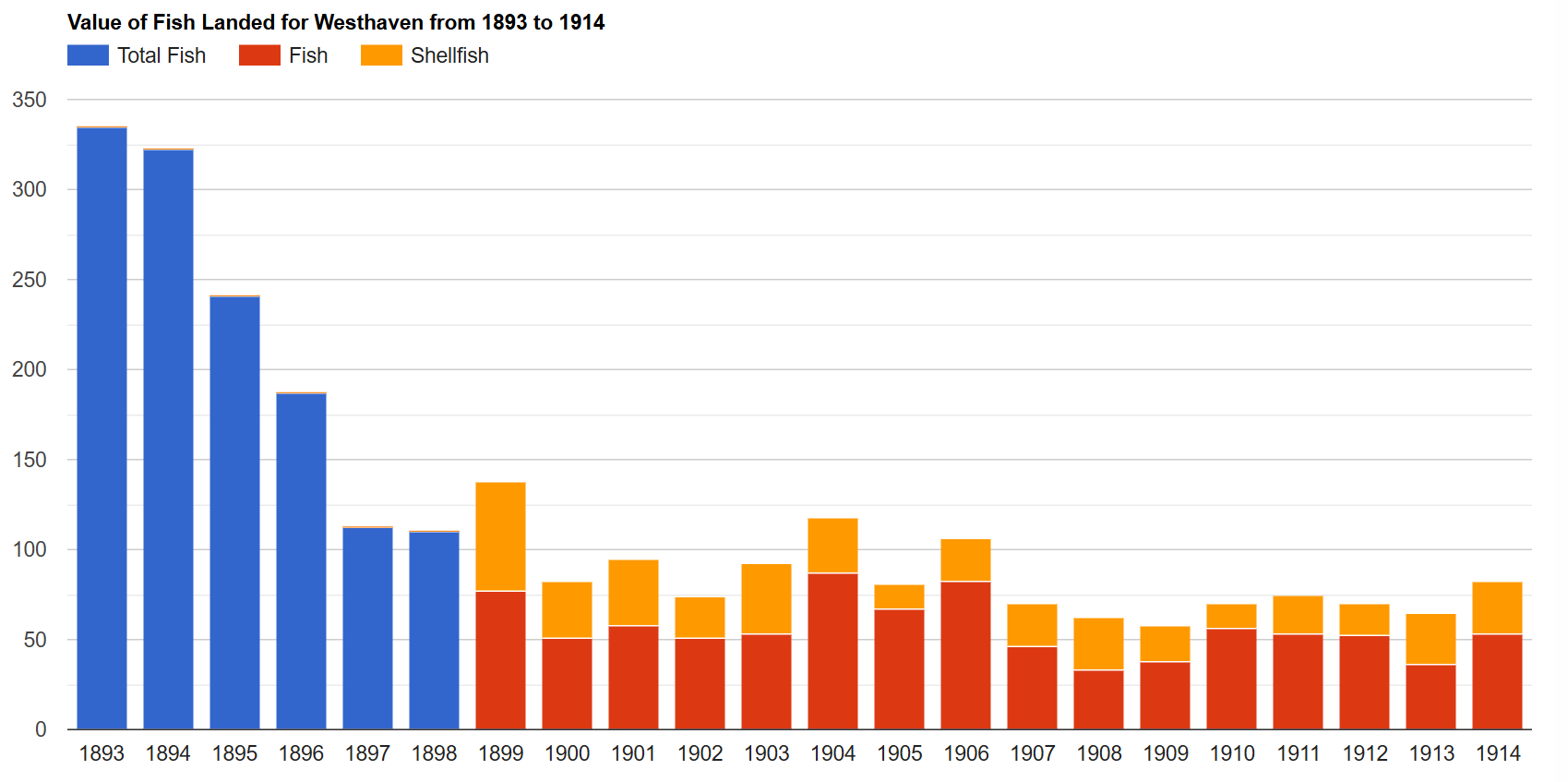
Value (£) of fish landed

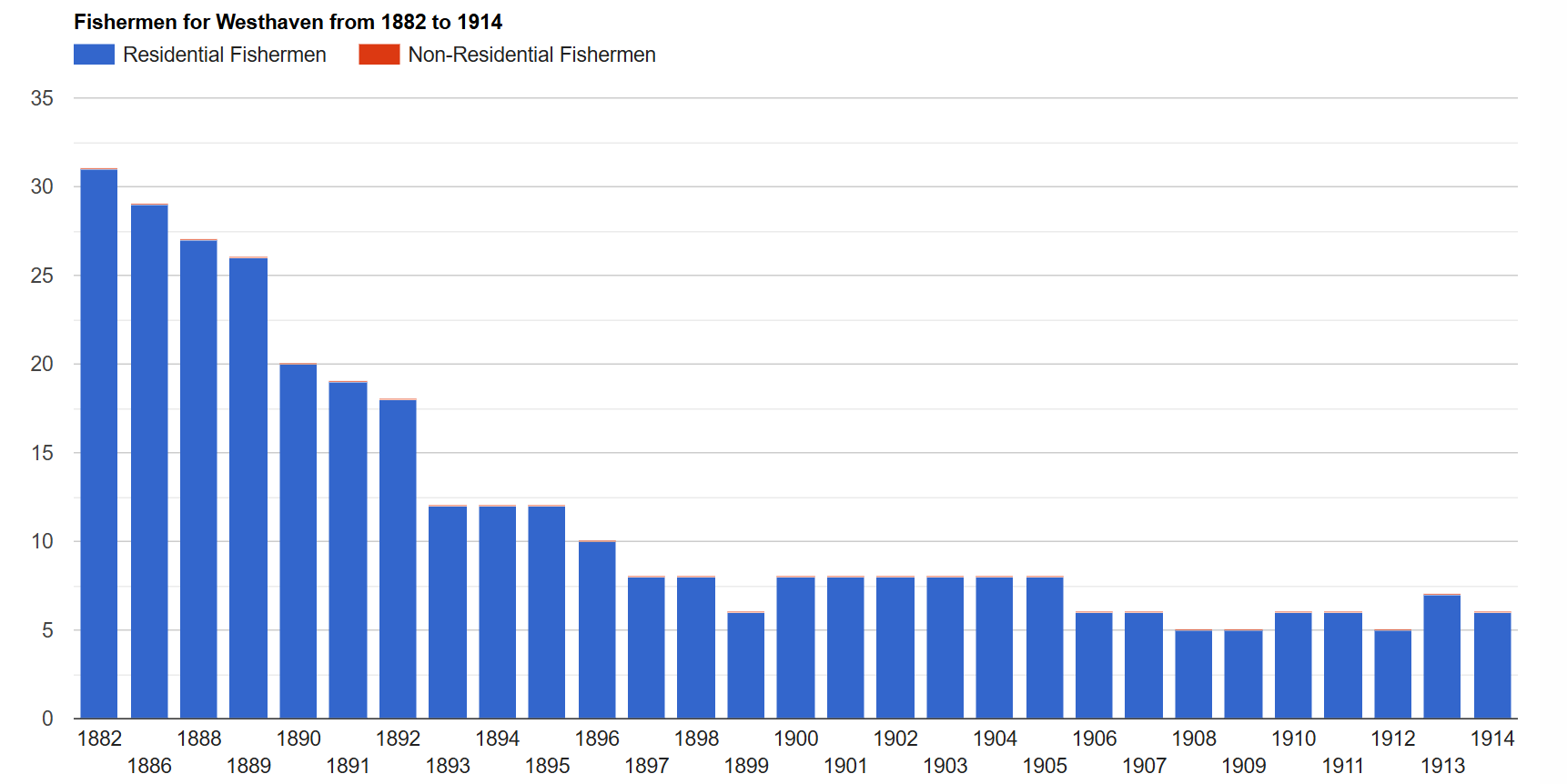
Fishermen

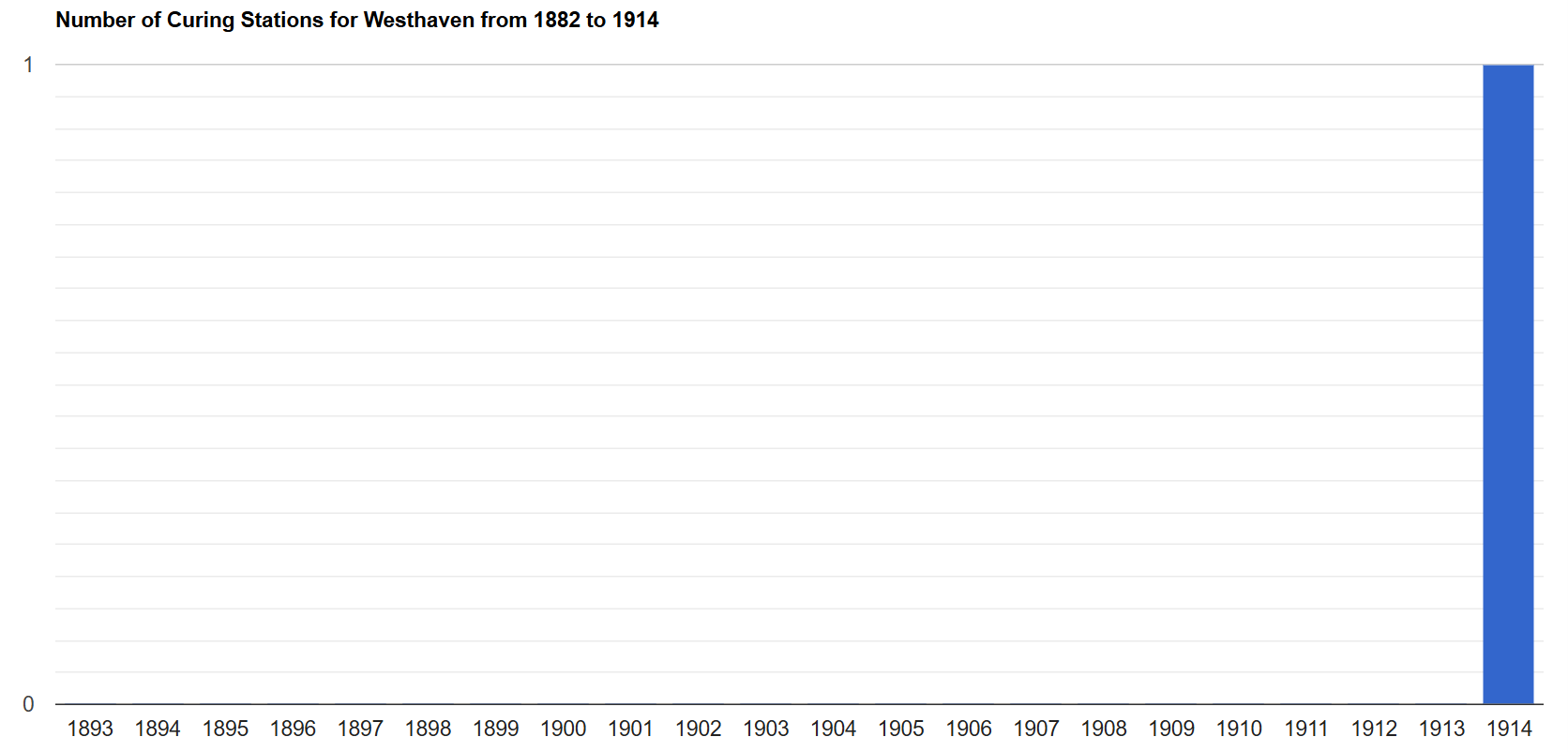
Number of curing stations

=== Development as a dormitory town ===
In addition to bringing industry to Carnoustie, the opening of the railway also made the town appealing to the middle classes, who used it as a commuter town for Dundee, further boosting population growth in the town. This trend has continued to the present day to the point where nearly half of the employed population now commute to Dundee for work.

=== Tourism and recreation ===
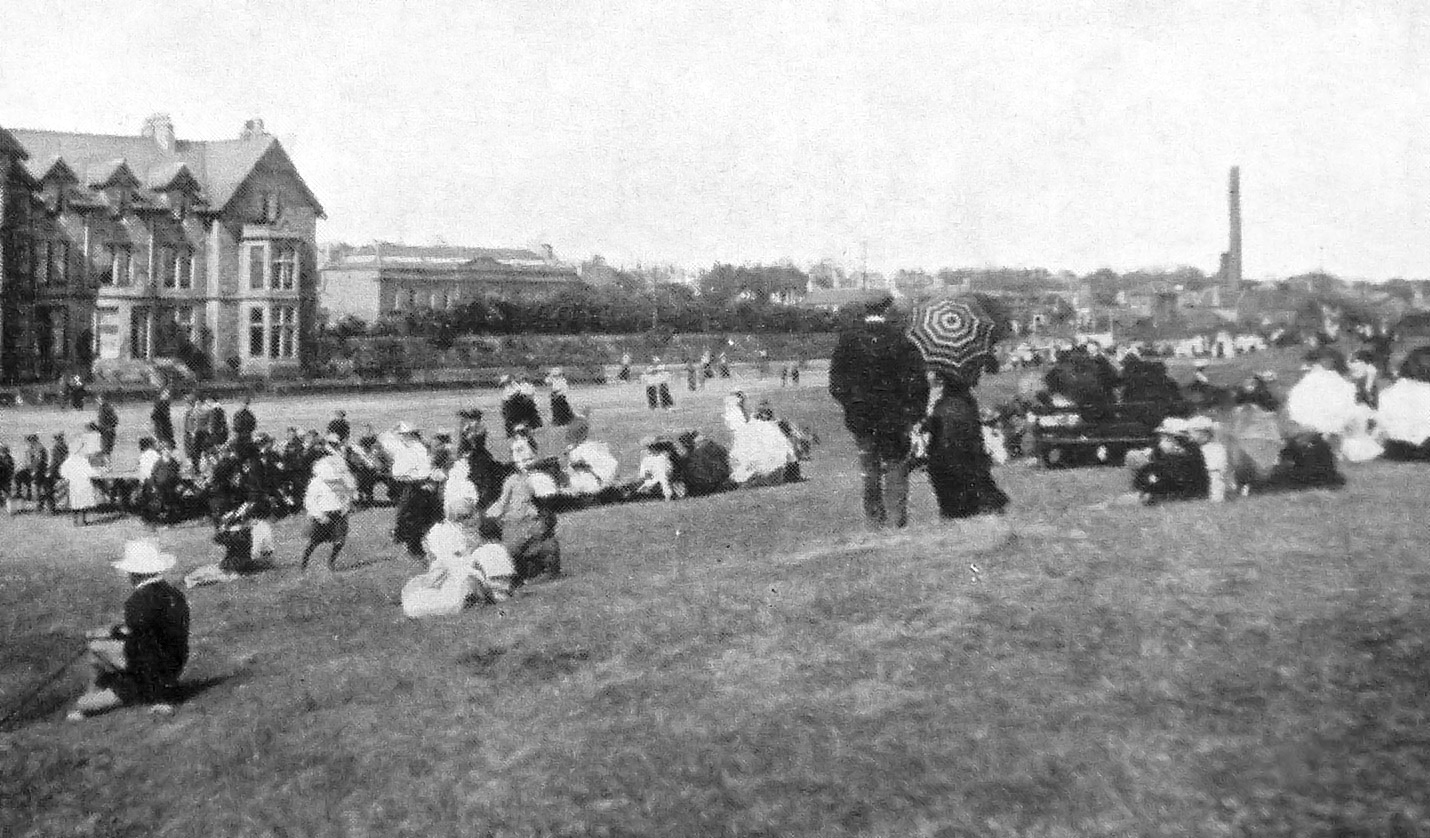
Carnoustie Links, circa 1910

Carnoustie benefited from the 19th-century fashion for sea bathing. The arrival of the railway enabled the town to develop as a popular tourist destination; it was promoted as the "Brighton of the North" in the early 20th century.

While golf has been played on Barry links since the 16th century, a formal 10 hole golf course was laid out in 1850 to the design of Alan Robertson of St Andrews. This was later improved in 1867 by Old Tom Morris, who added a further 8 holes. This course was redesigned in the 1920s by James Braid. In 1891, Arthur George Maule Ramsey, 14th Earl of Dalhousie, sold the links to the town on condition that they would be maintained for all time as a golf course. A three-day bazaar was held at the Kinnaird Hall in Dundee, which raised the funds for the purchase and secured the future of the links for golfing and leisure.

Tourism in Carnoustie began to decline in the latter half of the 20th century, largely due to the increased availability of package tours to warmer parts of the world. This trend has reversed somewhat with the increase in golf tourism.

== Governance ==
Carnoustie is represented within Angus Council by the Carnoustie & District ward, from which three councillors are elected. The town is part of the Arbroath and Broughty Ferry constituency of the Parliament of the United Kingdom which returns a Member of Parliament (MP) to the House of Commons, at Westminster. The constituency's MP is Stephen Gethins of the Scottish National Party.

Carnoustie is also part of the Angus South constituency of the Scottish Parliament, which has significantly different boundaries to the Westminster constituency. The constituency returns a Member of the Scottish Parliament (MSP) to Holyrood directly, and is part of the North East Scotland electoral region with regards to additional Members of the Scottish Parliament. The constituency's MSP is Graeme Dey of the Scottish National Party.

== Geography ==
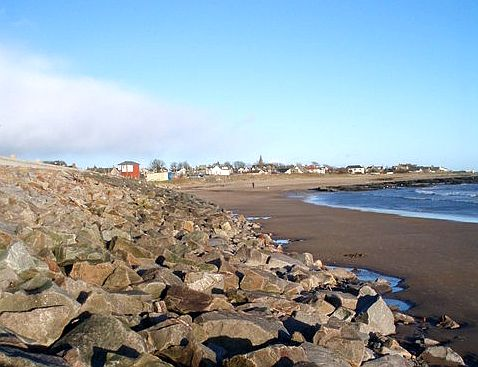
Carnoustie Beach with rocks to combat coastal erosion

Carnoustie occupies a seafront position on the North Sea coast of Scotland, on land immediately northeast of the Buddon Ness, 10 miles (16 kilometres) ENE of Dundee, 6 1/2 miles (10 kilometres) SW of Arbroath and 13 miles (21 kilometres) SSE of Forfar. The town lies 42 miles (68 km) NNE of Edinburgh and 360 miles (580 kilometres) NNW of London. The built-up area occupies a roughly rectangular shape measuring 2 by 1/2 mile (3 by 0.8 kilometres). The land is relatively flat, rising gradually to around 30 m elevation to the north of the town. The climate is typical for the east coast of Scotland, although the weather can be locally influenced by sea mist, locally known as haar.

The town straddles the border between the parishes of Barry and Panbride and incorporates a number of former villages and hamlets, including Greenlawhill, Gardynebourg and Hunterstown to the west, and Gallowlaw, Panbride and Westhaven to the east. Contiguous to the town, on the west side, is the village of Barry, and to the east, separated from the town by 250 yards (200 metres) is the hamlet that was known as Kirkton of Panbride (now known as Panbride). To the north of the town runs the A92, between Dundee and Arbroath. One mile (1.5 kilometres) east of the town lies the village of East Haven. Running through the town on the border of the two parishes is a small stream, the Lochty burn, and to the western edge of the town, runs the Barry Burn. The south-western corner of the town lies within the floodplain of the Barry Burn. One-half mile (800 metres) east of the town runs the Craig Mill burn, which flows through Batty's Den, into Craig Mill Den, to the sea.

Carnoustie

Climate chart (precipitation, max. and min. temperature)
J	F	M	A	M	J	J	A	S	O	N	D
58 8 3	30 8 2	43 9 3	34 13 5	38 15 7	54 18 11	43 20 12	85 19 12	29 17 10	63 14 8	39 10 4	33 7 2
- █ Average max. and min. temperatures in °C
- █ Precipitation totals in mm
- Source: Monifieth Weather Station
Imperial conversion
J	F	M	A	M	J	J	A	S	O	N	D
2.3 46 37	1.2 46 36	1.7 48 37	1.3 55 41	1.5 59 45	2.1 64 52	1.7 68 54	3.3 66 54	1.1 63 50	2.5 57 46	1.5 50 39	1.3 45 36
- █ Average max. and min. temperatures in °F
- █ Precipitation totals in inches

The Dundee and Arbroath Railway runs along the south of the town, bisecting the former villages of Gallowlaw and Westhaven to the east of the Lochty burn. The A930 runs through the town from Barry, and is named Barry Road, Dundee Street and High Street, as it runs from west to east. It turns sharply north at Gallowlaw, where it is named Carlogie Road, and carves a path through Batty's Den to Muirdrum, where it meets with the A92.

The part of the coast that lies to the east of the Lochty burn is a rocky shore, where the Devonian Old Red Sandstone bedrock is exposed. To the west, lies the sandy beach of Barry Sands (otherwise known as Carnoustie Beach). The soil is sandy and, prior to the founding of the town, the land resembled the sandy dunes of Barry Links. To the west of the Lochty burn, the shore is increasingly separated by the peninsula of the Buddon Ness, on which lies the three golf courses of Carnoustie Golf Links, and Panmure Golf Club. To the south of the golf courses lies the Ministry of Defence owned Barry Buddon training camp. This land is classified as a Site of Special Scientific Interest and a Special Area of Conservation.

The Buddon Ness is a triangle of land around 11 km^{2}. Its position at the estuary of the River Tay makes it prone to erosion, and the position of both the west and east facing shores have changed considerably since the founding of Carnoustie. Comparison of Ordnance Survey maps from the mid-19th century with present-day maps show the shoreline retreating on the west shore and advancing on the east shore. This is supported by comparison of old photographs of Carnoustie links with the present day situation in which the foreshore is now much further from the Beach Pavilion (now the Rugby Club) than it was 80 years ago. The concern latterly has been of the shoreline eroding from this part of the beach and rock armour was placed at the shoreline in 1994.

== Demography ==
The 2022 Scottish Census gives Carnoustie's total resident population as 11,359. This makes it the fourth largest town in Angus, after Arbroath (23,481), Forfar (13,801) and Montrose (11,251), but it was a notable decrease from the 2011 Census. While in 2011, The demographic breakdown of these figures closely follows that of the rest of Scotland. Males make up 47.4% of the population and females, 52.6%. Under-16s account for 18.2% of the population, retired people 19.6%, and economically active people make up 69.9%. 87.4% of the population were born in Scotland and 8.1% in England, with people from the rest of the United Kingdom making up 0.9%. 0.3% were from the Republic of Ireland, 0.9% from elsewhere in Europe and 2.4% from outside of Europe. 0.5% of the population speak Gaelic, whilst 32.2% of Carnoustie's population can speak Scots. 69.9% of the working-age population were economically active, 3.4% were unemployed.

== Economy ==
The economy of Carnoustie relies to a large extent on its proximity to Dundee. In the 2001 census, 2,267 people reported commuting to Dundee for work, making up 41.4% of the economically active, working-age population.

Golf is a major tourist draw to the town, and it is estimated that the recent Open Championship contributed £14 million to the local economy. Television coverage during the event was estimated to be worth the equivalent of £34 million in advertising value, half of which was in North America. The 'Carnoustie Country' golf marketing campaign is funded and promoted by Angus Council to promote the area for golfing tourism in the area.

== Landmarks ==
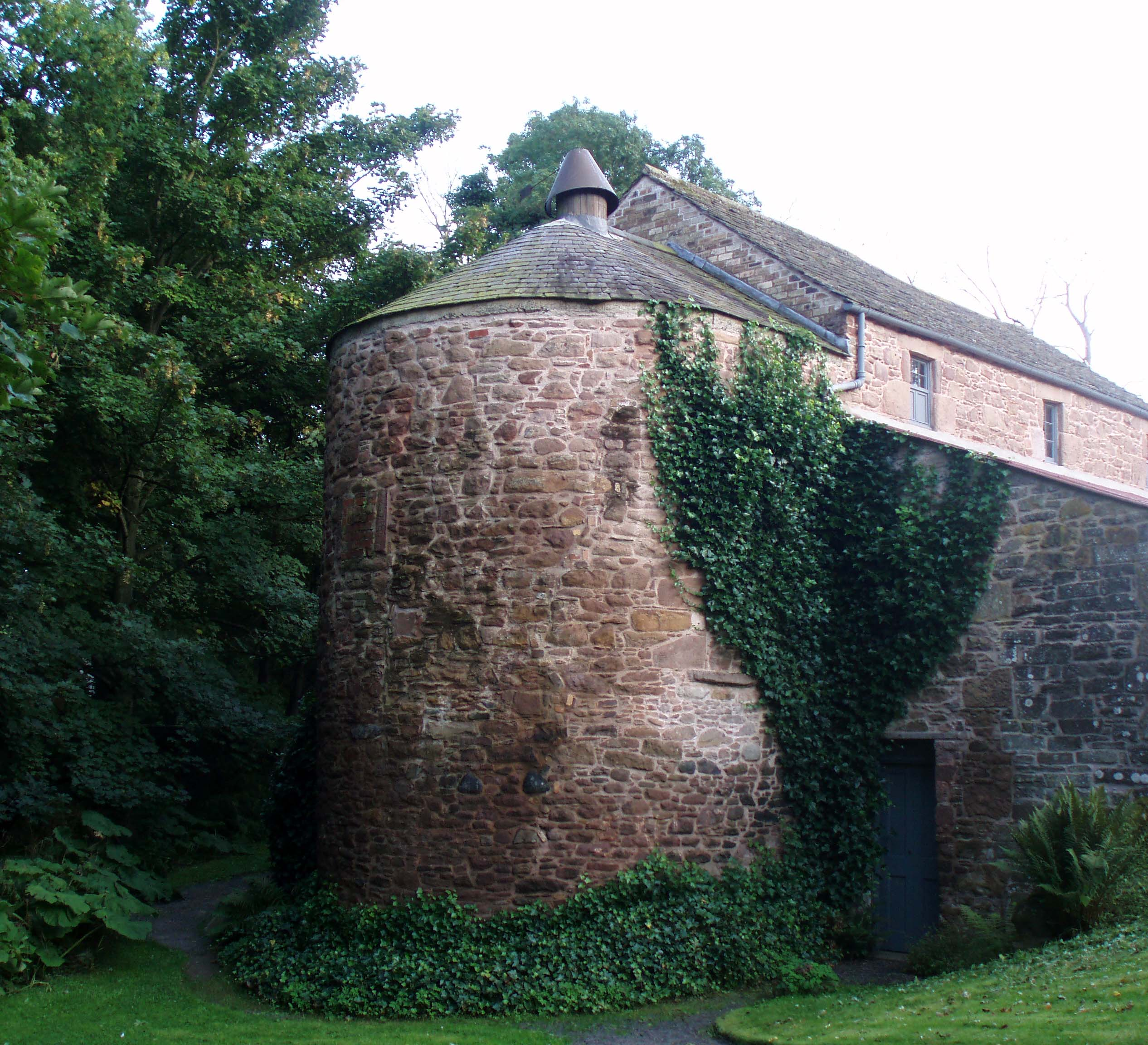
Barry Mill

At the far west end of the town is the village of Barry. On the north side of the road that runs through the village, to the west of the Barry Burn is the kirkyard and ruins of the old parish church. To the immediate east of this, a road heads north towards the old A92. Half a kilometre up this road, on the left hand side is the medieval motte associated with Grange of Barry, from where the monks of Balmerino Abbey managed the parish from the 13th century. On the other side of the road, a driveway runs towards the old Upper Mill, now simply known as 'Barry Mill', a water powered corn mill dating from 1815, when it was built on the site of a much older mill dating to the 16th century. The Mill is a Category A listed building and the nearby bridge which was part of the old road from Barry Grange to Panbride is Category B listed.

Much of the western part of Carnoustie is post-war. The main road in this part of the town is known as 'Barry Road' and towards its eastern end there are a group of weavers cottages that pre-date the expansion of the town and used to belong to the hamlet of Hunterstown. Leading south from here, is Panmure Street, which leads to the Panmure Institute and, behind it, the Panmure Works. The Panmure Institute is now known as the Panmure Centre and owned by Angus Council for their Community Learning and Development Centre. The factory building was restored in the late 1990s and now houses the building firm DJ Laing. At the end of Barry Road, the road diverts to the north slightly at the Corner Hotel, before continuing eastwards along Dundee Street. This corner, which used to be known as Hutton's corner, is where a rocky outcrop blocked the path of the plough when the road was originally marked out in the 18th century.

The road heading north on the opposite side of Dundee Street is 'West Path'. Its name comes from the fact it was the path that lead down to the main road from the western boundary of the grounds of Carnoustie House. Carnoustie House was built by Major William Philips in 1792 and bought by George Kinloch in 1808. It passed to Kinloch's daughter, Cecilia Kinloch who, in turn, passed it to her niece, Helen Lingard-Guthrie. The house and lands were bought by the council in the first half of the 20th century and the house was demolished following a fire around 40 years ago. Carnoustie House Grounds is now used as a park and is where the annual town gala is held. Part of the land is now occupied by Woodlands Primary School, Woodlands Caravan Park and the town recycling centre.

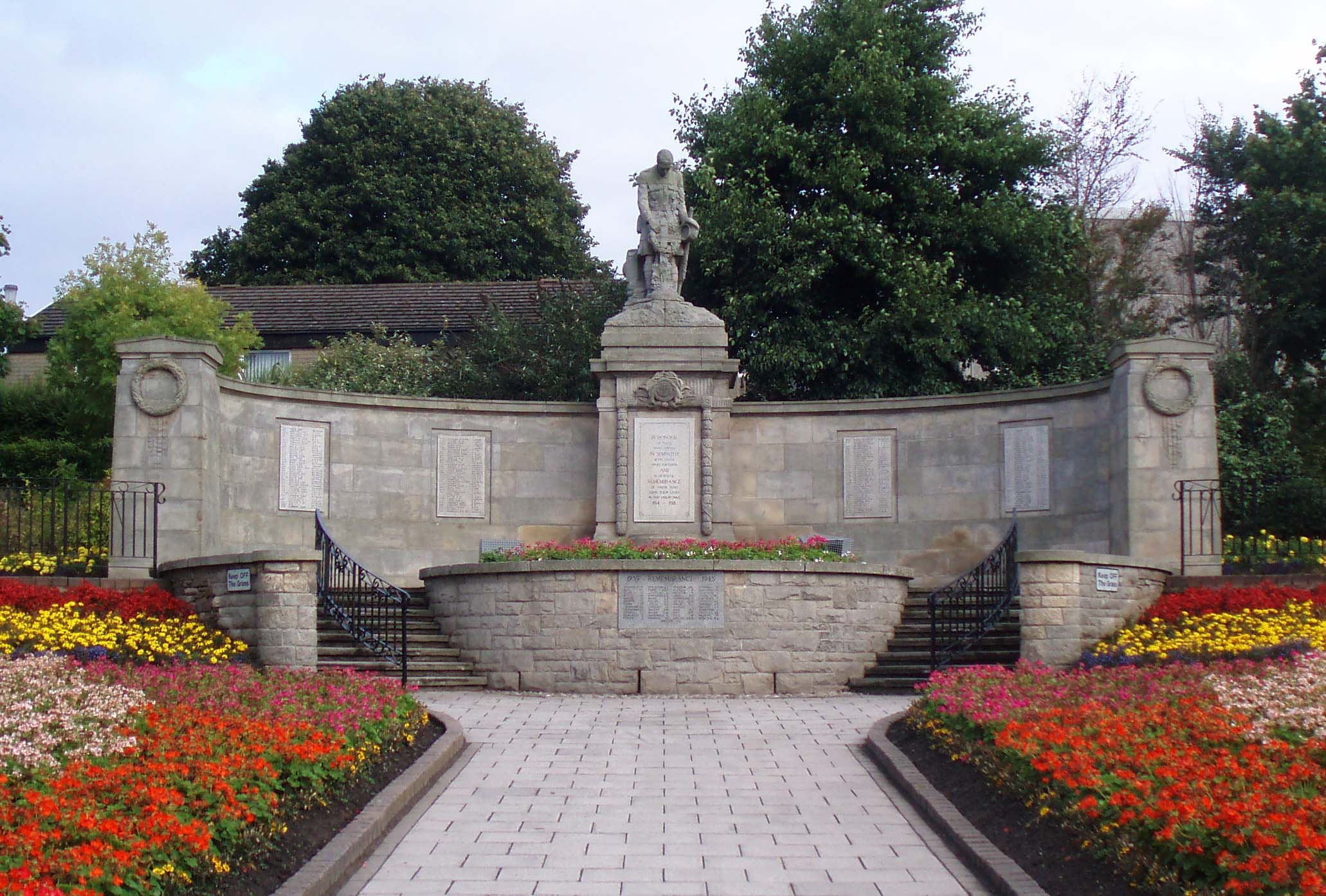
War memorial

Continuing eastwards along Dundee Street from the foot of West Path, on the north side of the road is the small former St Annes Roman Catholic Church. On the south side of the road, are the large grounds of Kinloch Primary School, opened in 1878 as Carnoustie Public School and last used as a school in November 2008 during renovations of Carlogie Primary School. The buildings were demolished in 2010 to make way for affordable housing.

Opposite the main part of the school is the former Erskine Free Church, which has been through a number of hands since it was sold off in the early 20th century and now houses All Stars sports bar, and beyond the school, heading south towards the beach is Links Avenue. On the left hand side of Links Avenue can be found the scout hut which, despite appearances, is the oldest school building in Carnoustie. The street passes through a narrow tunnel under the railway line to Links Parade near to Carnoustie Hotel, which was built in anticipation of the 1999 Open Championship. The hotel houses a 2.8 metre clock, weighing 450 kg, which was the largest timepiece supplied by Rolex at the time it was fitted. There are only 40 golf courses worldwide that have been given these Rolex clocks. Beyond the hotel lie the three golf courses of Carnoustie Golf Links.

Past Links Avenue on the north side of Dundee Street Carnoustie Church, which never received its steeple and, a little further past that, is the 'Auld Nick' which originally housed Carnoustie's police station. The war memorial lies adjacent to the Auld Nick and was dedicated in 1926. It features a sculpture of the Unknown Soldier by Thomas Beattie.

On the opposite side of the road from the Auld Nick is Ferrier Street and a little way down on the right hand side can be seen Thomas Lowson's Dibble Tree. Opposite the Dibble tree is Kinloch Street and, about 110 yards (100 metres) down that street on the north side, is the Erskine United Free Church, the oldest church building in Carnoustie, built in 1810.

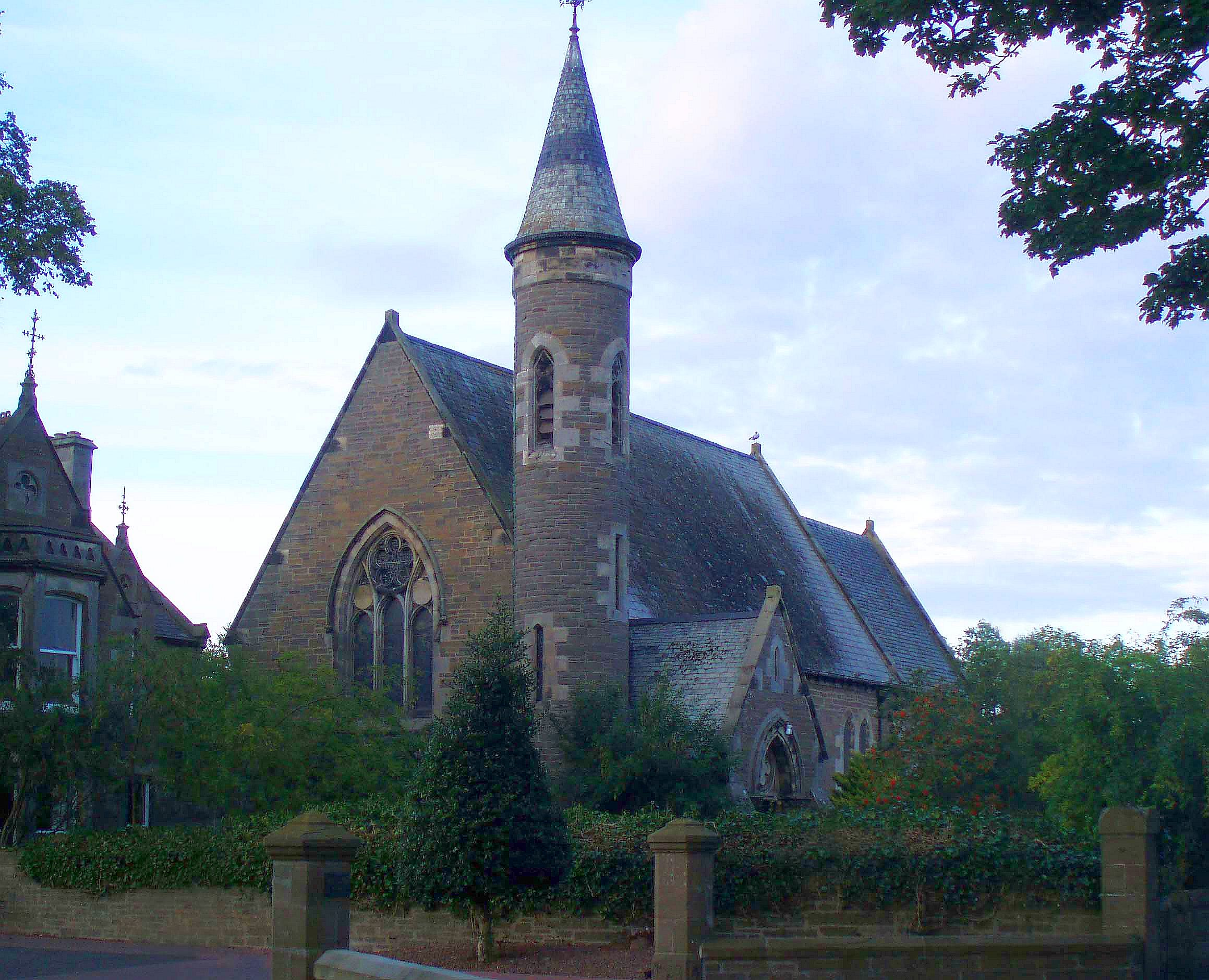
Church of the Holyrood

A short way past the war memorial on the southern side of Dundee Street is First Feu Cottage, Thomas Lowson's original home in Carnoustie, and beyond that is the traditional centre of the town, the Cross, marking the intersection between Dundee Street, High Street, Queens Street and Park Avenue. Meeting High Street on its north side, Lochty Street leads up to the Church of the Holyrood in Maule Street. It is a Category B listed building, the only listed building within the town, and was built on land donated by Helen Lingard-Guthrie, who had recently married one of the clergymen who ministered to the nascent Episcopalian congregation during the early summer missions, Rev. Roger Lingard.

At the easternmost end of High Street, the main road becomes Church Street, with Station Road heading south towards the main railway station and the adjacent Station Hotel, built in 1840. Opposite Station Road is the old City of Glasgow Bank building built in 1870 in Italianate style architecture that used to house the Clydesdale Bank. It is being developed into private accommodation. Church Street continues eastwards and at one time led all the way to Newton of Panbride church in the former village of Gallowlaw. The junction with Carlogie Road was realigned some years ago and the part of Church Street east of Carlogie Road renamed Arbroath Road. Past the church, on the south side of the road, a road bridge leads to the former fishing village of West Haven, which pre-dates Carnoustie by several centuries. To the east of the town, in Panbride, is Panbride Parish Kirk. The building itself is category C(s) listed, although its burial aisle and the nearby parish school are both Category B listed The 'Loupin' on Stane' a series of steps in the church courtyard that allowed churchgoers to mount their horses in a dignified manner have category B listing, as does the bridge over the Craigmill burn at the bottom of the hill. At the southern end of Craigmill Den, Panbride House has Category B listing, as does the associated stables.

== Transport ==
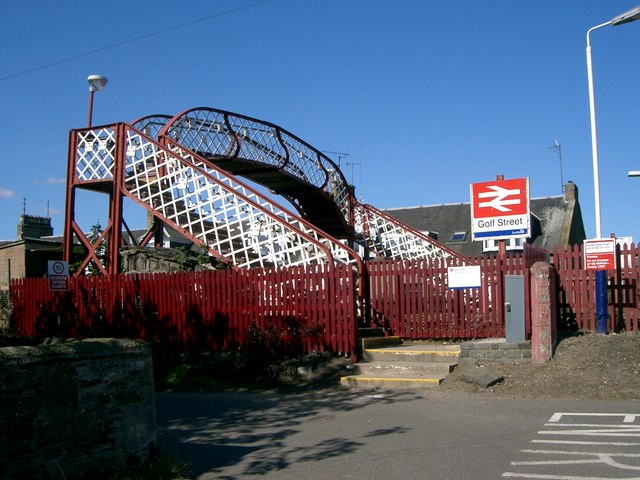
Golf Street railway station

The A92 runs between Arbroath and Dundee about 5/8 mile (1 kilometre) north of Carnoustie. There are several ways to reach the A92, including the main routes that run between the Upper Victoria junction and between the A930, Carlogie road and Muirdrum Junction. It is also possible to reach the west-bound carriageway of the A92 via Balmachy Road and the Grange of Barry Road.

Trains are operated by ScotRail on the Dundee-Aberdeen line. They stop at Carnoustie railway station on an approximately hourly basis. Two trains a day stop at Golf Street railway station (06:38 west-bound and 19:10 east-bound) and two at Barry Links (06:41 west-bound and 18:52 east-bound). As a result, Golf Street and Barry Links are two of the least used stations in the UK.

Buses are operated by Stagecoach Strathtay on their Arbroath or Carnoustie Westhaven to Dundee route. These are the number 73, 73A, 73B, 73C and 74 buses. They operate on a regular half-hourly basis everyday to Monifieth, Broughty Ferry, Dundee and Ninewells Hospital. Arbroath hourly. On weekdays, JP Minicoaches run service 181/A once a day from Muirdrum and Carnoustie to Monifieth and Forfar.

== Education ==
=== History of education ===
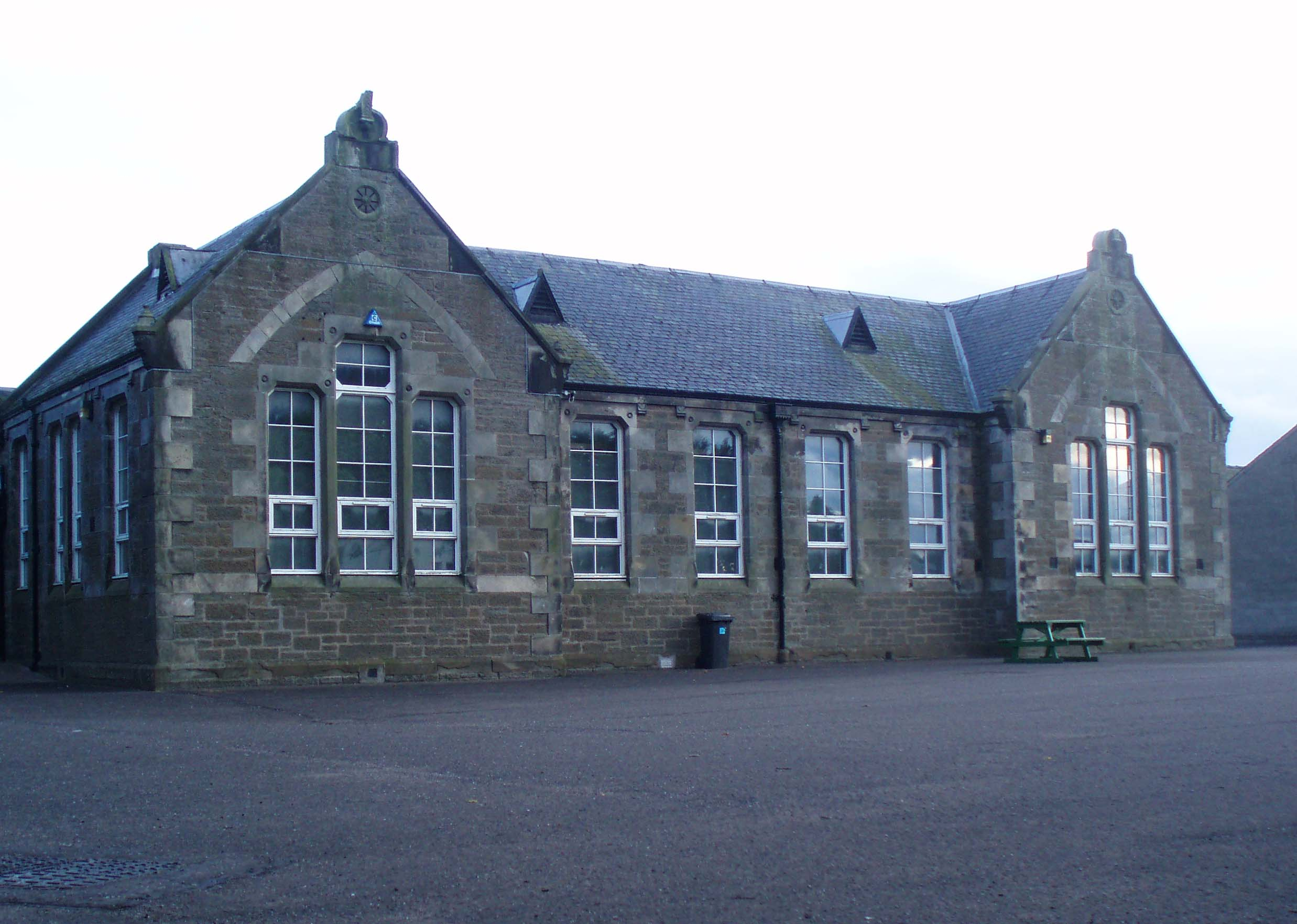
Carnoustie Public School, later Kinloch Primary School, demolished summer 2010

At the start of the 1870s, each church in Carnoustie had its own school. Some of these can still be seen today, in the former primary schools of Barry and Panbride, which were at that point the schools of Panbride Parish Church and Barry Free Church, and the Phillip Hall on Dundee Street, which was the school connected with the Erskine Free Church. These were supplemented with a number of private subscription schools, including a school in Links Avenue, opened in 1831, that now houses the local Scout group, and a school off Maule Street that is now used as Holyrood Church's Hall. These were both victims of the success of Carnoustie Free Church school and were abandoned. More successful were the school linked to Panmure Works and a private girls school in Kinloch Street, but these too were made redundant by the 1872 act.

Carnoustie Public School was built in 1878 near the Free Church school on Dundee Street. It was extended several times before the secondary school pupils were decanted to the new Carnoustie High School building in Shanwell Road. The old school was renamed Kinloch Primary School, and continued until 2006, when it, along with Barry and Panbride Primary Schools, was closed as part of the reorganisation of schools in the area.

=== Schools today ===
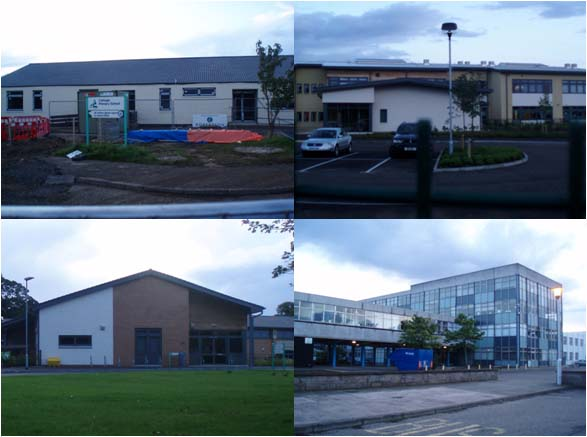
Schools in Carnoustie. Clockwise from top left: Carlogie Primary School; Burnside Primary School; Carnoustie High School; Woodlands Primary School

Carlogie Primary School was opened in the mid-1970s in the new Caesar Avenue/Linefield Road housing estate and its current catchment area is all of Carnoustie East of Queen Street and the pupils from the surrounding rural area that was used to be served by Panbride Primary School, including Panbride, East Haven, Hatton, Muirdrum, Auchrennie, Pitlivie and Salmond's Muir. The school's buildings and grounds were extensively refurbished in 2008.

Woodlands Primary School is a building in the former caravan park in Carnoustie House Grounds. Its catchment area is the central part of Carnoustie between Burnside Street and Queen Street, plus the rural area north of the town, incorporating Clayholes, Balmachie, Pitskelly, Upper Victoria and Heugh-Head.

Burnside Primary School is a building in Thomas Street on land that had been used as football pitches. Its catchment area includes the remaining part of Carnoustie and the former rural catchment of Barry Primary, including Barry, Cotside, Balhungie, Ardestie, Woodhill, Grange of Barry and Mains of Ravensby.

Carnoustie High School is situated on Shanwell Road and takes all secondary pupils from Carnoustie and the surrounding rural area, including former pupils of Carlogie, Woodlands, Burnside, Kinloch, Panbride, Barry, Newbigging and Monikie Primary Schools. The school was almost entirely rebuilt in 2008, the only part of the previous buildings retained being the old Physical Education Department, theatre and music department.

== Religion ==
=== History of religion ===
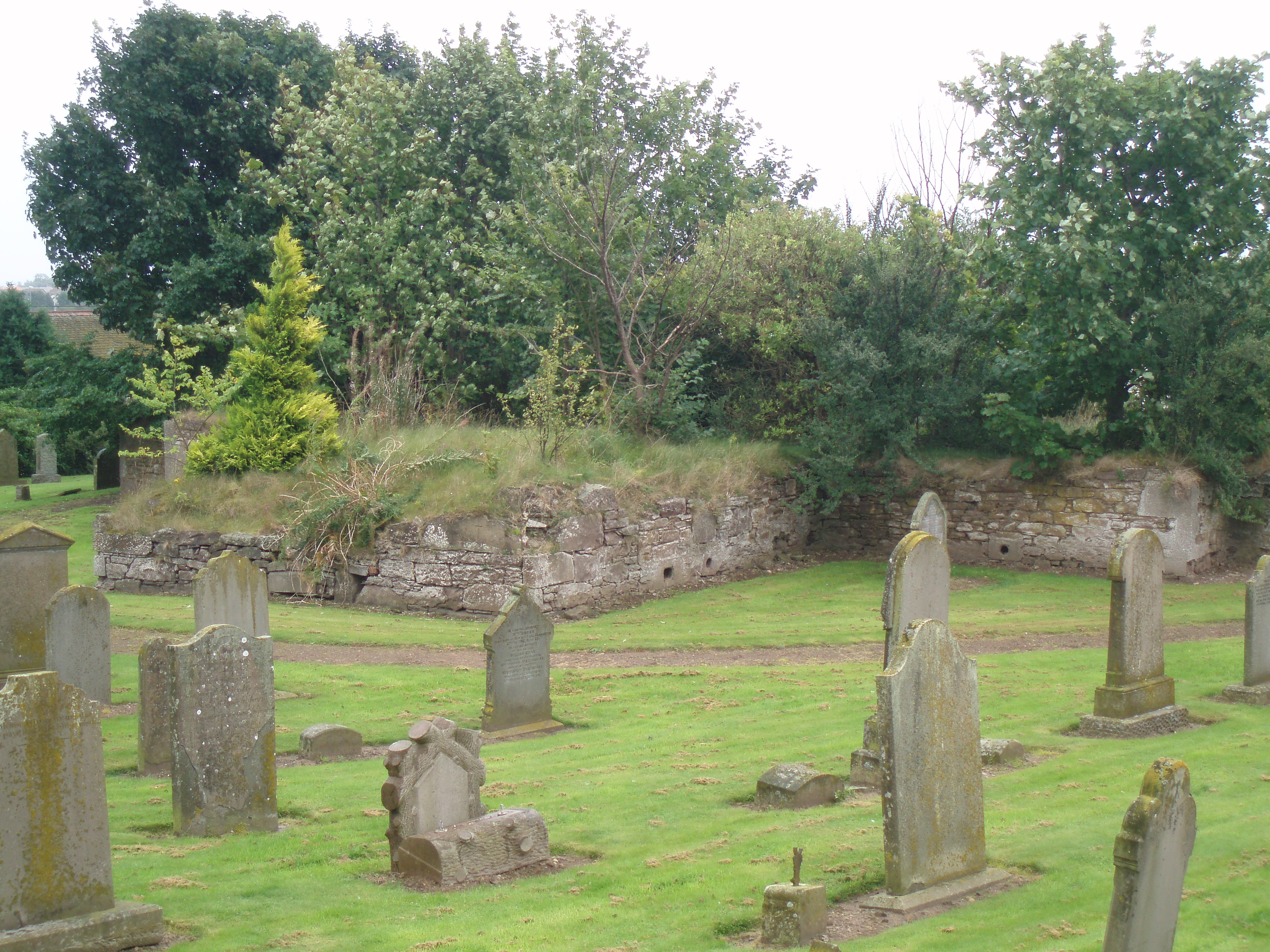
The old parish church at Barry, built 1800, demolished in 1965.

The site now occupied by Panbride Church has been a site of worship since 1147. A series of successive buildings have been built at the site, with the present building built in 1681 by George Maule, 2nd Earl of Panmure. It was extensively repaired in 1775 and enlarged considerably by Fox Maule in 1851.

Barry Parish was founded in 1230 when Alexander II bequeathed the land to Balmerino Abbey. The earliest record of a church at Barry is from 1243 when the parish church was consecrated by David de Bernham, Bishop of St Andrews (1238–1252). The building that was Barry Parish Church up until the 1950s was built in 1800 on the site of an earlier building that was described as being "old and sorry". All that remains of Barry Parish Church now is the lower portion of its walls and its kirkyard.

The first two churches within the town of Carnoustie were built in 1810 by two rival branches of the Secession Church, which had split from the Established Church in 1733 over the issue of patronage. The Anti-Burghers demolished the church they had built in 1789 near Grange of Barry Farm to rebuild it nearer the expanding village of Carnoustie. The 'Red Kirk', as it was known, was situated at Rye Park, where Thistle Street now stands. The Burghers, built their church the same year in Kinloch Street. This church later went through a series of Unions with other churches, becoming part of the United Original Secession Church in 1822 and the Free Church in 1852.

Barry Parish Church proved insufficient to house the rapidly expanding population of the parish and the refusal of the Heritors to fund its enlargement led to the building of Carnoustie church in 1837. This building was situated on the south side of Dundee street at the site on which now stands the Army and Air Cadets building. The quoad sacra parish was assigned to the church by the Presbytery of Arbroath in 1838.

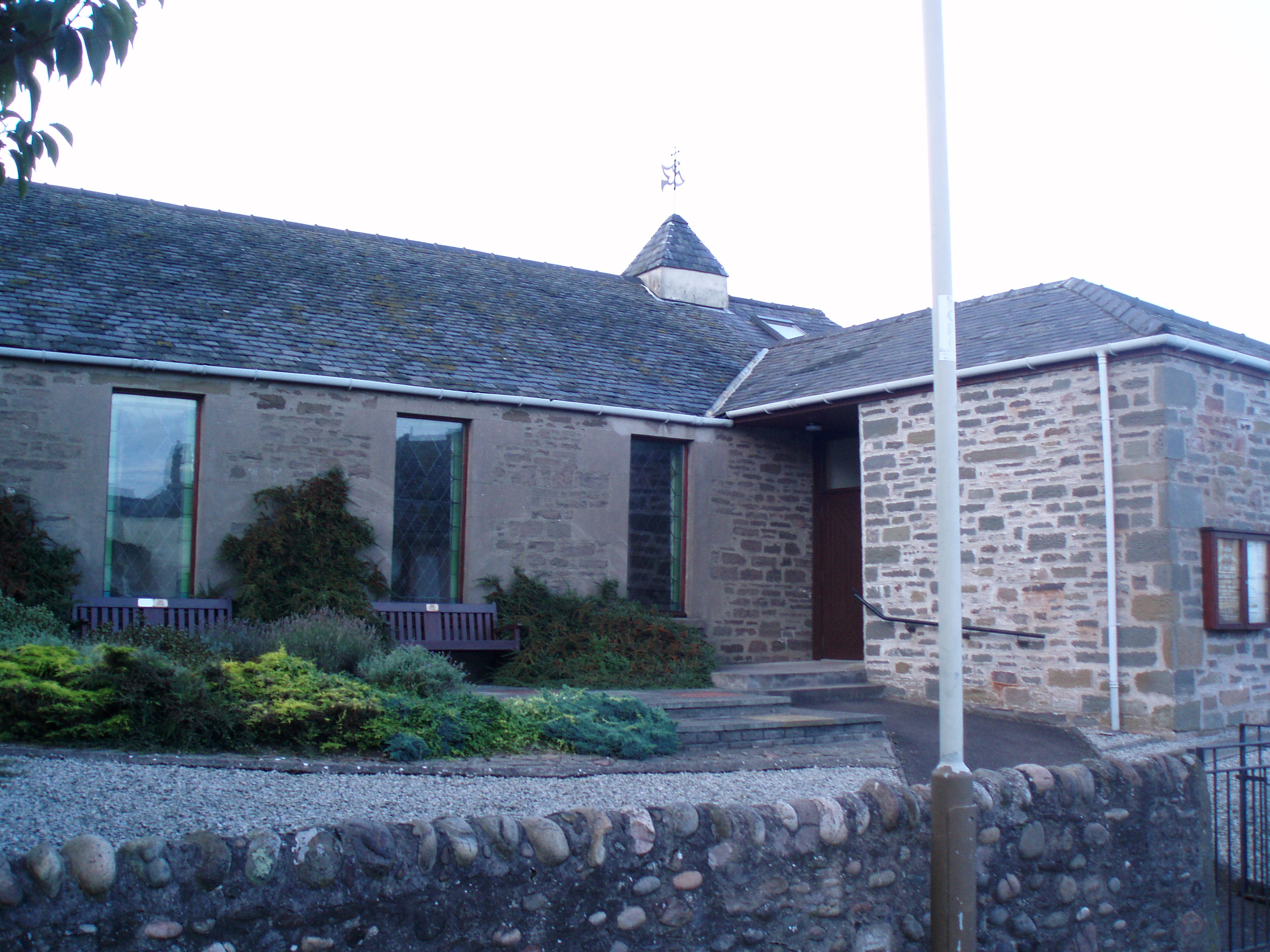
Erskine United Free Church, the Original Secessional Church, built 1810

The Disruption of 1843 had a profound effect on the town. A small Free Church was set up at the east end of Barry, and was replaced by a larger building in 1888, which continues as Barry Church today. The Free Church took over Carnoustie Church, and eventually built a second church immediately adjacent to it in 1850 when the Established Church claimed ownership of the building. This new building was later to become known as St Stephen's church. The school associated with the new Free Church, The Philip Hall, is still in existence and is now used by Carnoustie Church as their church hall. In 1854, the part of the congregation of Panbride Church that had joined the Free Church built what became Newton Church at Gallowlaw after several years of being housed in a wooden building on Westhaven Farm. The building was damaged by fire in 1887 and rebuilt to a larger design.

In 1873, the congregation of the Red Kirk, which had now become part of The United Presbyterian Church, again demolished their church and, in part, used the material to build The Erskine Church on the North side of Dundee Street. This, along with St Stevens Free Church, the Free Church in Kinloch Street, Barry Free Church and Newton of Panbride Church became part of the United Free Church when the United Presbyterians and Free Church merged in 1900.

The Scottish Episcopal Church traces its history in Carnoustie to 1853 when it began meeting in an old Schoolhouse off Maule Street. It was formed into a congregation in 1877, which rapidly outgrew its premises, leading to the building of The Church of The Holyrood in 1881, the former building becoming the church hall. The church building was graded as a Category B listed building in 1971

In 1901, the established Church of Scotland built a new church, St Brides Chapel, on Carlogie Road for the burghal part of Panbride parish. This building became redundant as a place of worship in 1929 when the congregations of the Free church and Established church united, and it served for a while as the Church hall, until it was sold to the Boys Brigade in 1952. Carnoustie Church built its new, larger church in 1902, opposite its former site. This building continues today to house the congregation of Carnoustie Church. The congregations of Carnoustie Church and St Stephen's merged in 1969, with St Stephen's being demolished to make way for the new Health Centre.

On unification of the United Free Church with the Established Church in 1929, St Stephens and The Erskine Church's congregations merged, using St Stephen's as a home. The Erskine Church was sold, and since then has variously been a cinema, snooker club and pub. Those that did not agree with reunification with the Established Church formed a congregation as part of The United Free Church (Continuing), first finding a home in the YMCA building, later buying the Original Secession Church in Kinloch Street in 1934. The two churches in Barry finally completed their move to the former Free Church site in the 1950s.

The congregations of Panbride Church and Newton of Panbride Church united in 1956 and those of Carnoustie Church and Barry Church in 2003.

The Carnoustie Christian Fellowship was an independent congregation meeting in a converted former Co-op building opposite the War Memorial. They were linked to a charismatic Christian movement known as the International Association of Healing Rooms. This congregation ceased meeting in 2011 and ownership of the building was transferred to a church plant from Dundee's Central Baptist Church that took the name of Carnoustie Community Church.

=== Religion today ===
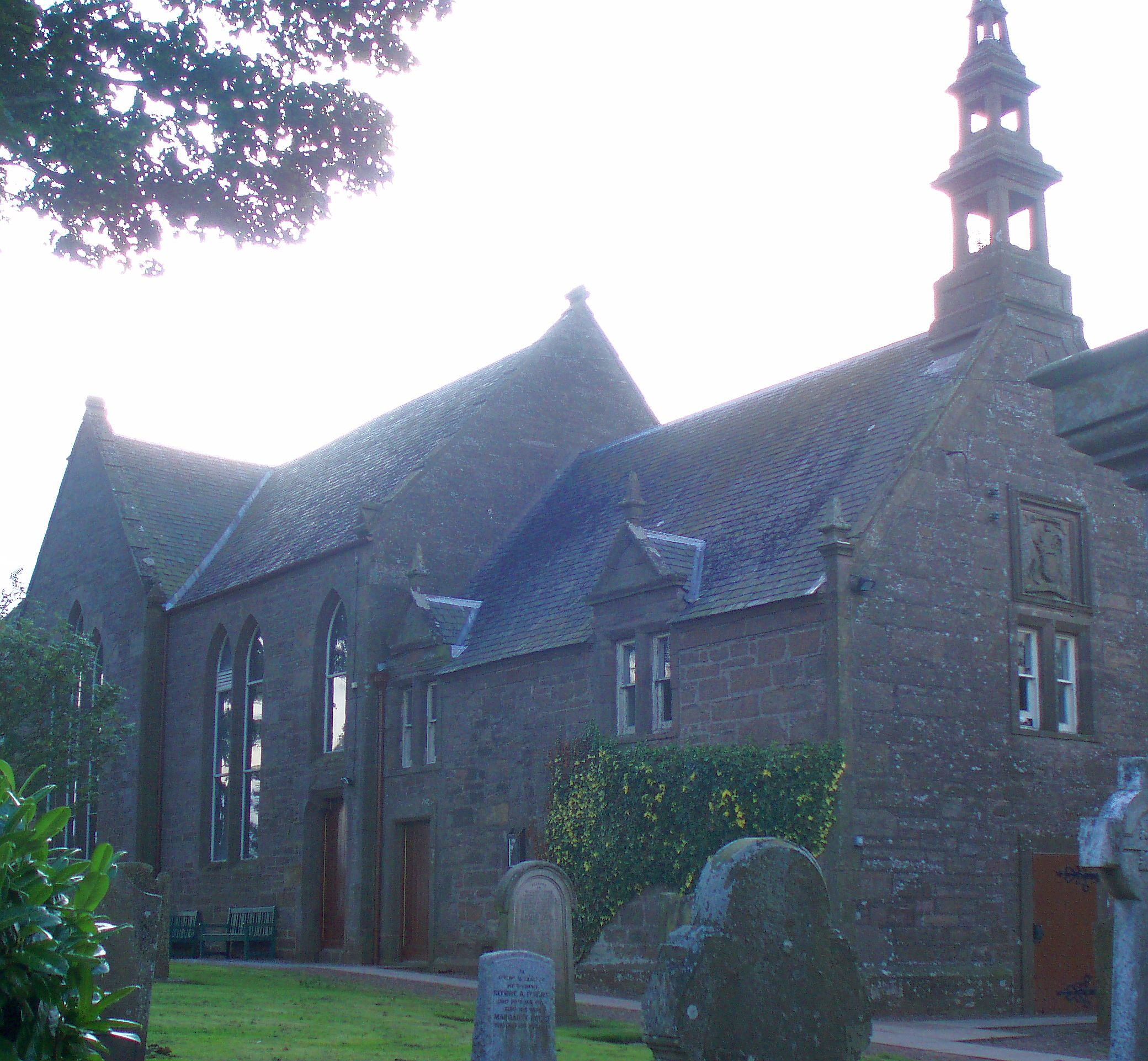
Panbride Church

The Church of Scotland today has three congregations that meet in Carnoustie. Carnoustie Church and Barry Church are linked under one minister, Rev. Michael Goss. During the months of July and August, they meet together in each church on alternate months. Carnoustie Panbride church meet at Newton Church during Winter months and Panbride in the Summer. The minister since January 2018 is Rev. Annette Gordon.

The Episcopalian congregation continues to meet at Holyrood church on the corner of Maule Street and Holyrood Street. The church is part of the Anglican Diocese of Brechin. Services are led by an interim pastor, Rev. John Cuthbert. Holyrood church and Holy Trinity Church in Monifieth are no longer linked. Holyrood's origins can be traced to a summer mission established in 1864, which was organised a formal mission 12 years later. Built as the Church of the Holy Rood in 1881, the charge became an incumbency in 1898. Its archives are held by the University of Dundee.

The Roman Catholic Church meets in the modern (built 2000) building of St Anne's Church in Thomas Street. This replaced the much smaller building the congregation had previously used in Dundee Street. The congregation is linked with St Bride's in Monifieth and St Thomas' in Arbroath. The church is part of the Roman Catholic Diocese of Dunkeld.

The Carnoustie Erskine United Free Church of Scotland meet at the former Original Secession Church on Kinloch street, and the Minister there is the Rev Douglas Campbell.

The Carnoustie Community Church is baptist congregation meeting in a converted former Co-op building opposite the War Memorial named 'The Bridge'. This congregation began in 2011 as a church plant from Dundee's Central Baptist Church initially meeting in hotels before moving into the building vacated by the Carnoustie Christian Fellowship. The pastor is Dr John Toller.

== Sport ==
=== Golf ===
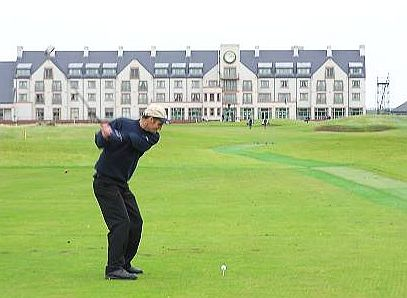
Carnoustie Championship Course, 18th tee

Carnoustie is famous for golf, which is first recorded as having been played here in the 16th century. Carnoustie Golf Links has three golf courses: the Championship course, on which several international tournaments are held, the Burnside course and the Buddon course.

Carnoustie Golf Links is one of the venues in The Open Championship's rotation. The course first played host to The Open in 1931, when it was won by Tommy Armour of the US. Subsequent winners have included Henry Cotton of England in 1937, Ben Hogan of the US in 1953, Gary Player of South Africa in 1968, Tom Watson of the US in 1975, Paul Lawrie of Scotland in 1999, Pádraig Harrington of Ireland in 2007, and Francesco Molinari of Italy in 2018.

The 1999 Open Championship is best remembered for the epic collapse of French golfer Jean van de Velde, who needed only a double-bogey six on the 72nd hole to win the Open—and proceeded to shoot a triple-bogey seven, tying with Paul Lawrie and 1997 champion Justin Leonard at 290, six over par. Lawrie won the playoff and the championship. With several experienced players running into difficulties on the course that year, the media responded by dubbing the course 'Carnasty'.

Carnoustie is also one of the three hosts of the Alfred Dunhill Links Championship, along with The Old Course at St Andrews and Kingsbarns.

In the early part of the 20th century, an estimated 300 golfers from Carnoustie emigrated to the United States, and were instrumental in the development of the sport there. When the Professional Golfers' Association of America was founded in 1916, nearly half of the 82 professional members were from Carnoustie.

The archives of Carnoustie Golf Club are held at the University of Dundee.

=== Football ===
Carnoustie is home to the junior football club Carnoustie Panmure F.C. Formed in 1936, they are nicknamed the Gowfers due to the town's well-established links to the sport of golf ("gowf" in Scots). They play at Laing Park, to which they moved in 2004, having previously played at Westfield Park.

The club received significant investment in the late 1990s, which has allowed them to emerge as one of the stronger Tayside clubs participating in the East Region. The pinnacle of their achievements was winning the Scottish Junior Cup in 2004.

The club plays in the Scottish Junior Football Association's East Region Premier League.

Carnoustie Panmure Youth FC, formed in 1979, is one of the biggest youth football clubs in the Tayside area, running football teams for boys from 9s to Under 19s level in the Dundee & District Youth Football Association league. In 2012 the club formed a Football Academy for boys & girls aged 5 to 8 years.

Carnoustie is represented by amateur football team Craws Nest.

In 2012 the main football clubs in Carnoustie came together to form Carnoustie Panmure FC as Scottish Charitable Incorporated Organisation. The current members are Carnoustie Panmure FC, Carnoustie YM AFC, Carnoustie Panmure Youth FC and Monifieth Ladies FC. The aim of the SCIO is to develop the Player Pathway and to provide better facilities for football in the area. In 2013 the joint club became the first to receive the Scottish FA Legacy Club Award in the SFA East Region.

=== Rugby ===
The town also has a thriving rugby club, Carnoustie HSFP, based at their clubhouse on Links Parade. The first XV team play in Division 2 (Midlands Section) of the Caledonia Regional League.

== Public services ==
Carnoustie and the surrounding area is supplied with water by Scottish Water. Water was supplied from Crombie reservoir until 1981. Since then, along with Dundee and parts of Perthshire, Angus has been supplied from Lintrathen and Backwater reservoirs in Glen Isla. Electricity distribution is by Scottish Hydro Electric plc, part of the Scottish and Southern Energy group.

Waste management is handled by Angus Council. There is a kerbside recycling scheme that has been in operation since May 2006. Cans, glass, paper and plastic bottles are collected on a weekly basis. Compostable material and non-recyclable material are collected on alternate weeks. Roughly two thirds of non-recyclable material is sent to landfill at Angus Council's site at Lochhead, Forfar and the remainder sent for incineration (with energy recovery) outside the council area.

A recycling centre is located at Balmachie Road. Items accepted include, steel and aluminium cans, cardboard, paper, electrical equipment, engine oil, fridges and freezers, garden waste, gas bottles, glass, liquid food and drinks cartons, plastic bottles, plastic carrier bags, rubble, scrap metal, shoes and handbags, spectacles, textiles, tin foil, wood and yellow pages. Angus council publishes details of where and how each product is processed. There are also glass banks at the Co-op and Craws Nest car parks. The Angus Council area had a recycling rate of 34.7% in 2007/08.

Healthcare is supplied in the area by NHS Tayside. The nearest hospitals with accident and emergency departments are Arbroath Infirmary and Ninewells Hospital, Dundee. Primary Health Care in Carnoustie is supplied by Carnoustie Medical Group which is based at Parkview Health Centre on Barry Road, opened in May 2006. Carnoustie, along with the rest of Scotland is served by the Scottish Ambulance Service.

Law enforcement is provided by Tayside Police and Carnoustie is served by Tayside Fire and Rescue Service. The Police Station is located at 5 North Burnside Street in Carnoustie.

== Twin town ==
Carnoustie is twinned with Maule, approximately 50 km west of Paris, due to Carnoustie and the surrounding area's long association with the Maule Family.

== Notable people ==
The 16th-century philosopher and historian, Hector Boece, was a member of the Boyce family that owned parts of Panbride parish at that time and is thought to have lived there.

Two streets in Carnoustie are named after Victoria Cross winners. Lance Corporal Charles Jarvis, Royal Engineers, was a resident of Carnoustie from 1889 until he joined the army in 1899. He was one of five men awarded the medal three weeks after the outbreak of Great War, for his role in destroying a bridge under heavy fire during the Battle of Mons on 23 August 1914. Petty Officer George Samson of the Royal Naval Reserve was born in Carnoustie in 1889, and awarded the medal for multiple acts of gallantry during the landings at Gallipoli on 25 April 1915, during which he rescued a number of his colleagues and treated their injuries under fire, before himself being hit by machine gun fire, sustaining 19 bullet wounds. His medals were sold at auction in 2007 for £247,000 to Lord Ashcroft.

The actor Ian McDiarmid, best known for his recurring role as Emperor Palpatine in the Star Wars series of films, is a native of Carnoustie, where he lived before moving to Dundee as a child.

Alan Cumming, who has played starring roles in major films such as GoldenEye and X2: X-Men United, lived on Panmure Estate, to the north of Carnoustie, and attended Carnoustie High School.

Iain Macmillan, photographer, notably of The Beatles' Abbey Road album cover, was born in Carnoustie and moved back there in the 1980s.

The Canadian-based poet, Stephen Scobie, was originally from Carnoustie.

A two-time winner of the U.S. Open golf championship, Alex Smith, was born in Carnoustie in 1874 and learned to play there before emigrating to the United States.

Jimmy Lawson was a professional footballer with Dundee before emigrating to the United States to become a golfer – two brothers Fred and Herbert did likewise.

Liz McColgan (born Elizabeth Lynch) is a runner, coach and Olympic athlete who lived on the outskirts of Carnoustie. At the 1988 Summer Olympic Games in Seoul, she was the Silver Medallist for the 10,000 metres. She captured the gold medal for the 10,000 metres at the 1991 World Championships in Athletics held in Tokyo. She also was the women's champion for the 1991 New York City Marathon, the 1992 Tokyo Marathon and the 1996 London Marathon. She is a Member of the Most Excellent Order of the British Empire (MBE).

Fred Martin, who was goalkeeper for Aberdeen F.C. from 1946 to 1960 and who was in goal for Scotland's 1954 World Cup squad, was born in Carnoustie and played for Carnoustie Panmure in his early career.

Kevin McDonald, Fulham F.C. midfielder, was born in Carnoustie in 1988.

Alice M G White aka Alicen White, an award-winning author and playwright, was born in Carnoustie in 1908.

== See also ==
- List of places in Angus
