= Barry, Angus =

Village in Angus, Scotland

Coordinates: 56.499831°N 2.754508°W

Barry
- Location within Angus
- OS grid reference: NO536344
  - Edinburgh: 42 mi (68 km) SSW
  - London: 367 mi (591 km) SSE
- Council area: Angus
- Lieutenancy area: Angus
- Country: Scotland
- Sovereign state: United Kingdom
- Post town: CARNOUSTIE
- Postcode district: DD7
- Dialling code: 01382
- Police: Scotland
- Fire: Scottish
- Ambulance: Scottish
- UK Parliament: Dundee East
- Scottish Parliament: Angus South

Barry (Scottish Gaelic: Barraidh) is a small village in Angus, Scotland, on Barry Burn at the mouth of the River Tay.

A bypass for the village on the A930 road from Dundee to Carnoustie- something which was first planned before the Second World War- was finally completed in 2003.

There is a water mill (Barry Mill) operated by the National Trust for Scotland.

== History ==
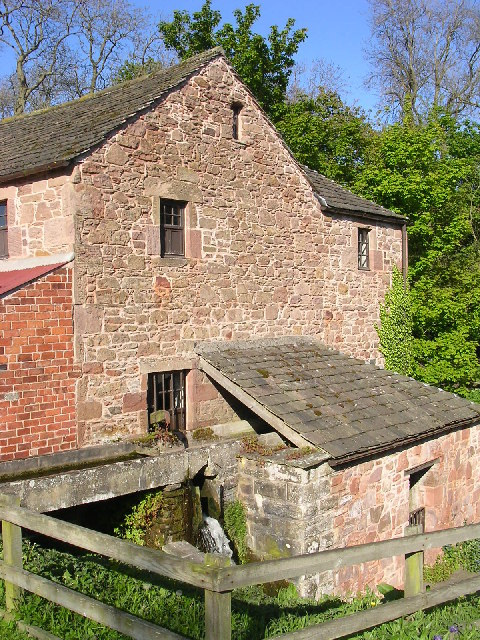
Barry Mill

The Parish of Barry, which was originally known as Fethmoreth, Fethmure, Fettermore or Fethmuref was originally bestowed to the monks of Balmerino Abbey in Fife by Alexander II in 1230. An early record of it can be found in a proverb attributed to Thomas the Rhymer:

The braes of Fettermore
Hae been a gude ship's shore

The monks originally managed the lands from the Grange of Barry and latterly the land was controlled by the office of the Bailies of Barry, an early holder of this position being Sir Thomas Maule of Panmure in 1511.

A number of feus were granted in the Parish around that time, including Ravensby in 1539, Gedhall to David Gardyne in 1541, half of Barry Links and Cowbyres to Walter Cant in 1545 and the other half of the links to Robert Forrester in 1552.

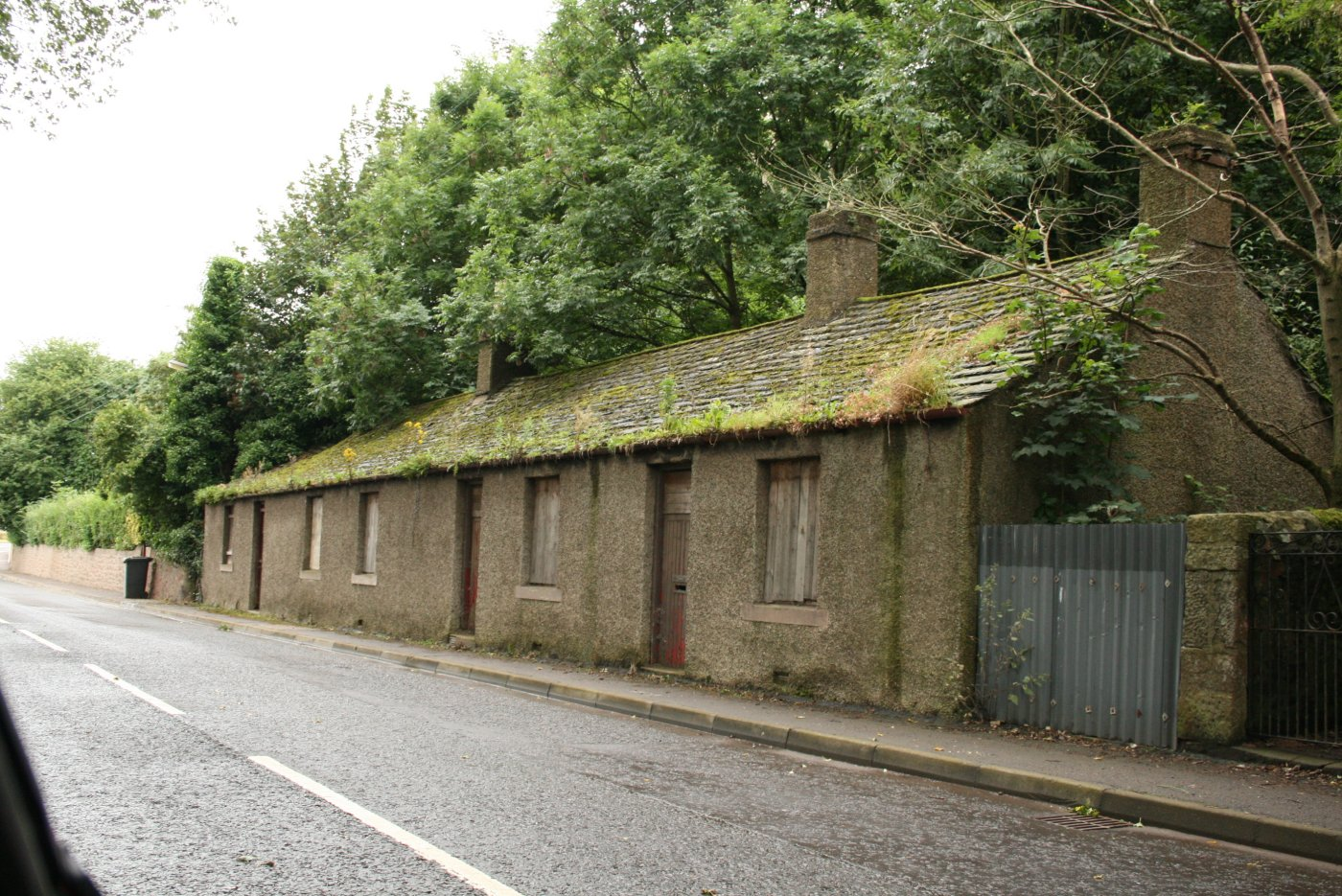
Old cottages in Barry

The land was annexed by the crown in the Protestant Reformation following an Act of Parliament in 1587 and the Bailiery of Barry was granted by James VI as a heritable gift to Patrick Maule in 1590. Ownership of the lands was granted by the King to James Elphinstone, Secretary of State in 1599 (ratified 1605), and was sold to George Maule, 2nd Earl of Panmure in 1667 (ratified in 1672) for £746 13s 4d. The land was forfeited following James Maule, 4th Earl of Panmure's involvement in the Jacobite rising of 1715.

Barry Buddon Training Area is a large open space on the nearby dunes, adjacent to Carnoustie Golf Links.

== Amenities ==
The village is served by Barry Links railway station on the other side of the A930 bypass road. The station itself sees very infrequent service, twice per day each way except Sundays.

A regular hourly bus service between Dundee and Arbroath, operated by Stagecoach East Scotland, calls at stops on Main Street of the village.

The village once had at primary school which closed in 2007.

== Bus Services ==
Stagecoach Strathtay operate the bus services in the area. Their services 73 & 73B connect the village with Arbroath, Dundee and Ninewells Hospital daily. On weekdays, JP Minicoaches run service 181/A once a day from Barry to Monifieth and Forfar. In the opposite direction, the 181 and 181A run to Carnoustie and Muirdrum.

== Notable people ==
Alexander Carnegie Kirk, innovative engineer in several fields, was born at Barry on 16 July 1830. His brother John Kirk, a physician, explorer, and naturalist, was born there on 19 December 1832.

Thomas Lowson, who tradition says was the founder of Carnoustie, was born in Barry around 1764 and was still living there in 1797.

Rev. James MacGregor (born at Callander in 1829) served as the Presbyterian minister from 1856 till 1861.

== See also ==
- List of places in Angus
- List of British Army installations
