= List of listed buildings in Dundee/1 =

This is a list of listed buildings in Dundee, Scotland.

== List ==
Name	Location	Date Listed	Grid Ref. (Note: Sometimes known as OSGB36, the grid reference (where provided) is based on the British national grid reference system used by the Ordnance Survey. • "Guide to National Grid". Ordnance Survey. • "Get-a-map". Ordnance Survey.)	Geo-coordinates	Notes	LB Number (Note: Historic Environment Scotland assign a unique alphanumeric identifier to each designated site in Scotland, for listed buildings this always begins with "LB", for example "LB12345".)	Image
West Ferry, 20 Douglas Terrace, Formerly West Ferry Station				56°28′08″N 2°53′13″W	Category B	25921	Upload Photo
West Ferry, 75 Dundee Road, Including Gatepiers And Wall Extending To 73 Dundee Road				56°28′09″N 2°54′05″W	Category B	25924	Upload Photo
West Ferry, 96 Dundee Road, St Stephen's And West Church, Including Enclosing Wall, Gatepiers And Dies				56°28′05″N 2°52′55″W	Category A	25932	Upload another image
West Ferry, 7 Fairfield Road, Fairfield, Including Coach House, Lamp Standard, Wall And Gatepiers				56°28′12″N 2°54′03″W	Category B	25936	Upload Photo
West Ferry, 17 Fairfield Road, Red Court Lodge				56°28′17″N 2°54′05″W	Category B	25939	Upload Photo
West Ferry 48 Victoria Road And 129 Strathearn Road, Hermon Lodge, Including Conservatory, Gatepiers And Boundary Wall				56°28′23″N 2°53′11″W	Category B	25953	Upload Photo
Broughty Ferry, 155-159 (Odd Nos) King Street, The Eagle Inn				56°27′58″N 2°52′35″W	Category B	25844	Upload Photo
337, 339 King Street And 69-77 (Odd Nos) St Vincent Street, Ramsay Place				56°27′56″N 2°52′15″W	Category C(S)	25845	Upload Photo
Broughty Ferry, 375, 377 King Street, With Enclosing Walls				56°27′54″N 2°52′11″W	Category C(S)	25847	Upload Photo
Broughty Ferry, 140-144 (Even Nos) King Street				56°27′58″N 2°52′38″W	Category C(S)	25849	Upload Photo
Broughty Ferry, 14 Monifieth Road, Walnut Cottage, Including Gateposts And Enclosing Wall				56°28′03″N 2°52′05″W	Category C(S)	25859	Upload Photo
Broughty Ferry, 94 Monifieth Road, Armistead Lodge, Including Wall And Gatepiers				56°28′12″N 2°51′18″W	Category C(S)	25861	Upload Photo
Broughty Ferry, 7, 9, 11 And 13 Norrie Street, Including Boundary Wall And Gatepiers				56°28′08″N 2°51′53″W	Category C(S)	25863	Upload Photo
Broughty Ferry, 15 Norrie Street, Craigruach, Including Gatepiers And Adjoining Walls				56°28′09″N 2°51′53″W	Category B	25864	Upload Photo
Broughty Ferry, 13-21 (Odd Nos) Queen Street, Including Boundary Wall				56°28′09″N 2°52′50″W	Category B	25865	Upload Photo
Broughty Ferry, 2-8 (Even Nos) Queen Street, (And 4 Claypotts Road) Including Boundary Wall				56°28′08″N 2°52′50″W	Category B	25868	Upload Photo
Broughty Ferry, 160 St Vincent Street				56°28′00″N 2°52′10″W	Category C(S)	25878	Upload Photo
Broughty Ferry, 45 Seafield Road, Mount Rosa, Including Conservatory, 3 Pairs Of Gatepiers And Boundary Wall				56°28′22″N 2°52′43″W	Category B	25881	Upload Photo
Broughty Ferry, 18 Westfield Road And 9 King Street				56°28′01″N 2°52′53″W	Category B	25883	Upload Photo
Broughty Ferry, Westfield Road, Our Lady Of Good Counsel Roman Catholic Church				56°28′02″N 2°52′52″W	Category C(S)	25884	Upload Photo
Pitkerro Lodge, Pitkerro Lodge, Including Gatepiers And Gates				56°29′23″N 2°53′23″W	Category A	25894	Upload Photo
West Ferry, 5 Albany Road And 36 Strathern Road, The Croft, Including Wall And Gatepiers				56°28′17″N 2°54′19″W	Category B	25902	Upload Photo
West Ferry, 37, 39, 41, 43 Albert Road, Taymount, Including Summerhouse And Lamp Standards				56°28′16″N 2°52′54″W	Category B	25908	Upload Photo
West Ferry, 1 Balmyle Road, Balmyle, Including Motor House/Garage, Gatepiers And Boundary Walls				56°28′13″N 2°53′29″W	Category B	25909	Upload Photo
Broughty Ferry, 20 Camphill Road, With Gatepiers				56°28′08″N 2°52′11″W	Category C(S)	25780	Upload Photo
Broughty Ferry, 50 Camphill Road, Camphill House, (Entry From 8 Norrie Street)				56°28′10″N 2°51′57″W	Category B	25784	Upload Photo
Broughty Ferry 61-69 (Odd Nos) Castle Street, Salisbury Place Including Enclosing Wall				56°27′57″N 2°51′53″W	Category C(S)	25787	Upload Photo
Broughty Ferry, 2 Dalhouse Road And 2, 4 And 6 Shiell Street, Including Outbuilding Game Larder, Boundary_Walls And Gatepiers (Formerly Abertay House)				56°28′15″N 2°51′07″W	Category B	25790	Upload Photo
Broughty Ferry, 1-5 (Inclusive) East Links Place				56°27′58″N 2°51′50″W	Category C(S)	25792	Upload Photo
Broughty Ferry, 57 Fisher Street, Ann Cottage				56°27′55″N 2°52′43″W	Category C(S)	25794	Upload Photo
Broughty Ferry, 109 Fisher Street And 4 Fort Street				56°27′54″N 2°52′37″W	Category C(S)	25799	Upload another image See more images
Broughty Ferry, 183 Fisher Street				56°27′54″N 2°52′30″W	Category C(S)	25803	Upload Photo
Broughty Ferry, 207 Fisher Street And 5-11 (Odd Nos) Gray Street				56°27′55″N 2°52′27″W	Category C(S)	25804	Upload Photo
Broughty Ferry, 32 And 34 Fort Street				56°27′57″N 2°52′36″W	Category B	25814	Upload Photo
Broughty Ferry, 80 Forthill Road, Red Cottage, Including Boundary Walls				56°28′28″N 2°52′27″W	Category B	25820	Upload Photo
Broughty Ferry, 85, 87 And 89 Gray Street, Clydesdale Bank				56°28′01″N 2°52′25″W	Category C(S)	25822	Upload Photo
Broughty Ferry, The Harbour, 3 Lampstandards				56°27′50″N 2°52′14″W	Category B	25831	Upload Photo
Broughty Ferry, 1 Hill Street, St Margaret's Including Wall And Gatepiers				56°28′11″N 2°52′29″W	Category C(S)	25833	Upload Photo
48 And 48A Roseangle, Including Garden Walls				56°27′13″N 2°59′08″W	Category C(S)	25674	Upload Photo
Springfield 1-32 (Inclusive Nos)				56°27′24″N 2°59′09″W	Category A	25678	Upload Photo
11 Step Row, Former Dundee Rope Works Tar House				56°27′20″N 2°59′32″W	Category B	25679	Upload Photo
1-28 (Inclusive Nos) Windsor Street				56°27′18″N 2°59′51″W	Category B	25688	Upload Photo
Broughty Ferry, Beach Crescent, K6 Telephone Kiosk				56°27′54″N 2°52′26″W	Category B	25732	Upload Photo
Baldovie, Road Bridge Over Fithie Burn				56°29′19″N 2°53′38″W	Category B	25736	Upload Photo
Barnhill, 2 Panmure Terrace, Longcroft, Including Myrtle Cottage				56°28′22″N 2°51′10″W	Category B	25748	Upload Photo
Broughty Ferry, 19 Ambrose Street				56°27′56″N 2°52′31″W	Category C(S)	25755	Upload Photo
2-8 (Even Nos) Perth Road				56°27′24″N 2°58′42″W	Category B	25581	Upload Photo
36-42 (Even Nos) Union Street				56°27′32″N 2°58′14″W	Category B	25594	Upload Photo
44-50 (Even Nos) Union Street				56°27′32″N 2°58′13″W	Category B	25596	Upload Photo
7-13 (Odd Nos) Well Road, Including Boundary Wall And Gatepiers				56°27′27″N 2°59′08″W	Category B	25620	Upload Photo
1 West Bell Street, Including Railings				56°27′45″N 2°58′31″W	Category B	25624	Upload Photo
3, 5, 7 West Bell Street, Curr Centre, Including Railings				56°27′45″N 2°58′33″W	Category B	25627	Upload Photo
9 West Bell Street, Including Railings				56°27′44″N 2°58′34″W	Category B	25629	Upload Photo
2-16 (Even Nos) West Port, 52-58 (Even Nos) South Tay Street				56°27′33″N 2°58′40″W	Category B	25635	Upload Photo
512 Perth Road Dunholm, With Gatepiers And Boundary Wall				56°27′23″N 3°01′16″W	Category C(S)	25638	Upload Photo
514 Perth Road Nyoora, With Garden Walls And Gatepiers				56°27′23″N 3°01′17″W	Category B	25640	Upload Photo
516 Perth Road, Ardvreck, With Boundary Walls And Gatepiers				56°27′23″N 3°01′21″W	Category B	25642	Upload Photo
2-18 (Even Nos) Pitfour Street				56°27′51″N 2°59′53″W	Category B	25644	Upload Photo
2-8 (Even Nos) Whitehall Crescent, 14 And 15 Dock Street				56°27′33″N 2°58′08″W	Category B	25645	Upload Photo
1 And 3 Whitehall Street, 8 Nethergate, Blakeney's Buildings				56°27′35″N 2°58′16″W	Category B	25657	Upload Photo
2 Roseangle, Including Railings And Gates To Street And Garden Walls				56°27′22″N 2°58′53″W	Category B	25660	Upload Photo
38, 40 Whitehall Street, Kimberley Buildings				56°27′34″N 2°58′11″W	Category B	25671	Upload Photo
1-63 (Odd Nos) Reform Street				56°27′43″N 2°58′17″W	Category B	25519	Upload Photo
16-32 (Even Nos) Reform Street				56°27′40″N 2°58′16″W	Category B	25528	Upload Photo
78-86 (Even Nos) Victoria Road And 2, 4 Forebank Road				56°27′57″N 2°58′06″W	Category B	25530	Upload Photo
227-229 Perth Road, Blackness Crescent Including Gatepiers And Boundary Walls				56°27′24″N 2°59′48″W	Category C(S)	25534	Upload Photo
42-58 (Even Nos) Reform Street				56°27′42″N 2°58′19″W	Category B	25535	Upload Photo
Barrack Road And Dudhope Terrace, Caird Wing, Dundee Royal Infirmary				56°27′58″N 2°58′54″W	Category B	25543	Upload Photo
30-34 (Even Nos) Seagate				56°27′43″N 2°58′05″W	Category B	25544	Upload Photo
1-27 (Odd Nos) South Tay Street, 105-113, (Odd Nos) Nethergate, Including Railings, And Boundary Walls To Rear				56°27′30″N 2°58′33″W	Category A	25546	Upload Photo
271-297 (Odd Numbers) Perth Road And 1 Rockfield Street, Clarendon Terrace, With Boundary Walls And Gatepiers				56°27′24″N 3°00′08″W	Category B	25549	Upload Photo
37, 39 South Tay Street				56°27′31″N 2°58′35″W	Category B	25552	Upload Photo
41, 43 South Tay Street				56°27′32″N 2°58′35″W	Category C(S)	25554	Upload Photo
8, 9, 10, 11 Tay Square, 18 South Tay Street				56°27′29″N 2°58′35″W	Category B	25570	Upload Photo
381 Perth Road, 2A, 2B, 2C And 4 Hazel Drive Duncarse House, Lodge, Boundary Walls, And Gatepiers				56°27′29″N 3°01′36″W	Category B	25573	Upload Photo
84, 88, 90 Nethergate				56°27′32″N 2°58′21″W	Category B	25425	Upload Photo
Macalpine Road Dundee Crematorium With Gates, Pergola And Lodge				56°29′08″N 3°00′20″W	Category B	25428	Upload another image
7, 9, 11 Madeira Street				56°28′32″N 2°57′10″W	Category B	25432	Upload Photo
92-96 (Even Nos) Nethergate				56°27′31″N 2°58′22″W	Category B	25433	Upload Photo
132, 132A, 134 Nethergate				56°27′29″N 2°58′26″W	Category B	25444	Upload Photo
134A, 134B Nethergate				56°27′28″N 2°58′26″W	Category B	25447	Upload Photo
2, 4, 6 Hyndford Street, And 40-44 Shaftesbury Road, Including Garden Walls				56°27′26″N 3°00′07″W	Category B	25449	Upload Photo
136-148 (Even Nos), Nethergate, Including Remains Of Former Sea Wall To South				56°27′28″N 2°58′29″W	Category A	25451	Upload Photo
1, 1A Magdalen Place, Magdalen House With Boundary Walls And Gatepiers				56°27′13″N 2°59′12″W	Category B	25453	Upload Photo
160 Nethergate, Queen's Hotel, Including Lampstandards And Former Sea Wall				56°27′25″N 2°58′34″W	Category B	25461	Upload Photo
164 Nethergate, Including Boundary Walls And Railings				56°27′25″N 2°58′36″W	Category B	25467	Upload Photo
65 Magdalen Yard Road, With Gatepiers And Garden Walls				56°27′13″N 2°59′31″W	Category B	25484	Upload Photo
1-9 (Inclusive) Trottick Mains				56°29′31″N 2°58′19″W	Category C(S)	25497	Upload Photo
6 Union Terrace And 7 Constitution Terrace, With Boundary Walls And Gatepiers				56°27′59″N 2°58′39″W	Category C(S)	25512	Upload Photo
10, 12, 14 Victoria Road, Victoria Chambers				56°27′52″N 2°58′18″W	Category B	25518	Upload Photo
53, 55 Forfar Road, With Gatepiers Garden Walls, And Railings To Garages				56°28′46″N 2°57′07″W	Category B	25311	Upload Photo
38, 40 Seagate, Former Robertson's Bond				56°27′43″N 2°58′04″W	Category B	25325	Upload Photo
33, 35 Meadowside Or Albert Square				56°27′46″N 2°58′12″W	Category B	25327	Upload Photo
41 High Street Lochee St Mary's Rc Church And Presbytery				56°28′14″N 3°00′28″W	Category A	25338	Upload Photo
Airlie Place 1-15 (Odd Numbers) Airlie Hall, Dundee University With Boundary Walls And Railings				56°27′24″N 2°58′50″W	Category B	25341	Upload Photo
30 Meadowside, 2, 4 Royal Exchange Lane, Former Pearl Assurance Buildings				56°27′48″N 2°58′15″W	Category B	25343	Upload Photo
Airlie Place, 2-14 (Even Nos) Dundee University With Boundary Walls And Railings				56°27′25″N 2°58′54″W	Category B	25344	Upload Photo
45, 47 High Street, Lochee And 2 St Mary's Lane, Public Library, Swimming And Leisure Centre				56°28′16″N 3°00′31″W	Category B	25345	Upload Photo
12, 14 Murraygate				56°27′44″N 2°58′09″W	Category B	25366	Upload Photo
124, 126 Blackness Road, Al-Maktoum Institute For Arabic And Islamic Studies (Former St Joseph's School)				56°27′36″N 2°59′18″W	Category B	25384	Upload Photo
6, 8 Laurel Bank, And 5, 7 Prospect Place With Boundary Walls And Gatepiers				56°27′55″N 2°58′36″W	Category B	25397	Upload Photo
11 Blinshall Street, Former St Mary Magdalene's Church (Episcopal)				56°27′38″N 2°58′52″W	Category B	25400	Upload Photo
145 Nethergate				56°27′27″N 2°58′35″W	Category B	25414	Upload Photo
1 Lawside Road				56°28′01″N 2°59′33″W	Category C(S)	25417	Upload Photo
6 Dudhope Street And Boundary Walls				56°27′54″N 2°58′34″W	Category B	25210	Upload Photo
106-116 (Even Nos) Cowgate Former Wishart Memorial Church And John O'Groats Bar				56°27′54″N 2°57′49″W	Category B	25213	Upload Photo
1A And 2 High Street/2, 4, 6 Castle Street				56°27′40″N 2°58′07″W	Category B	25219	Upload Photo
3, 4 High Street/1, 3, 5 Castle Street, Royal Bank Of Scotland				56°27′39″N 2°58′08″W	Category B	25223	Upload Photo
36 Forebank Road, St Mary's Or Our Lady Of Victories, Rc Church				56°28′02″N 2°58′15″W	Category B	25249	Upload Photo
1, 2 Forebank Terrace				56°27′59″N 2°58′10″W	Category C(S)	25253	Upload Photo
11-13 (Inclusive Nos) City Square, 20-24 (Even Nos) Crichton Street, 1-7 (Inclusive Nos) Shore Terrace And Return To 35 Castle Street, Caird Hall				56°27′35″N 2°58′08″W	Category A	25258	Upload another image See more images
11 Dudhope Terrace				56°27′58″N 2°59′07″W	Category B	25261	Upload Photo
12 Dudhope Terrace				56°27′58″N 2°59′09″W	Category B	25265	Upload Photo
13 Dudhope Terrace				56°27′57″N 2°59′10″W	Category B	25268	Upload Photo
14 Dudhope Terrace And 1, 3 Inverlaw Place, Including Former_Stables				56°27′57″N 2°59′12″W	Category B	25272	Upload Photo
Eliza Street, Clepington Primary School Former Stobswell Public School, Including Railings And Boundary Walls				56°28′22″N 2°57′34″W	Category A	25280	Upload another image
Off Perth Road, Geddes Quadrangle, Peters Building, University Of Dundee				56°27′27″N 2°58′52″W	Category B	25285	Upload Photo
Small's Lane, Ewing Building, University Of Dundee, Including Boundary Walls, Railings, Gates And Gatepiers				56°27′29″N 2°58′49″W	Category B	25296	Upload Photo
23-45 (Odd Nos) And 14-22 (Even Nos) Heron Rise, Claverhouse Road, Claverhouse Bleachfield, Former Beetling House, Office And Chimney Stalk (Tvj Ltd)				56°29′31″N 2°57′46″W	Category A	25112	Upload Photo
Claverhouse Road Bridge Over Dighty Water				56°29′28″N 2°57′44″W	Category B	25130	Upload Photo
23-29 (Odd Nos) Crichton Street				56°27′35″N 2°58′11″W	Category C(S)	25138	Upload Photo
Clepington Road And Return To Stobsmuir Road, Stobsmuir Water Works				56°28′38″N 2°57′07″W	Category B	25141	Upload Photo
20, 21, 22 Dock Street				56°27′37″N 2°58′01″W	Category B	25154	Upload Photo
56-59 (Inclusive Nos) Dock Street				56°27′42″N 2°57′53″W	Category B	25170	Upload Photo
Court Street 1-23 (Odd Nos) "The Connies"				56°28′27″N 2°57′47″W	Category B	25180	Upload Photo
4 Dudhope Street With Boundary Walls And Gatepiers				56°27′54″N 2°58′35″W	Category C(S)	25206	Upload Photo
Methven Street, Camperdown Works High Mill Or Sliver Mill				56°28′21″N 3°00′25″W	Category A	25041	Upload Photo
133 Broughty Ferry Road Carolina House, Former Dundee Orphan Institution, With Railings				56°28′06″N 2°56′13″W	Category B	25042	Upload Photo
Byron Street Ss Peter And Paul Rc Primary School, Janitors House And Play Shelter				56°28′24″N 2°58′52″W	Category B	25058	Upload Photo
23 Commercial Street				56°27′40″N 2°58′01″W	Category C(S)	25059	Upload Photo
96 Byron Street Lawton Reservoir (Original Covered Reservoir, Cottage, Railings And Gates				56°28′20″N 2°59′28″W	Category B	25062	Upload Photo
35-49 (Odd Nos) Commercial Street/1, 3, 5 Seagate				56°27′41″N 2°58′03″W	Category B	25067	Upload Photo
51-65 (Odd Nos) Commercial Street/1, 3, 5 Murraygate/20-26 (Even Nos) Seagate				56°27′42″N 2°58′06″W	Category A	25071	Upload Photo
Camperdown Country Park Camperdown Dairy Cottage				56°29′07″N 3°02′46″W	Category C(S)	25082	Upload Photo
18, 22-32 (Even Nos) Commercial Street, Calcutta Buildings				56°27′39″N 2°58′01″W	Category B	25083	Upload Photo
Princes Street And Return Elevations To Dens Street, Constable Street And St Roques Lane, Lower Dens Works				56°27′56″N 2°57′47″W	Category A	25093	Upload another image
68-110 (Even Nos) Commercial Street/11, 13 Meadowside				56°27′42″N 2°58′10″W	Category A	25099	Upload another image
Camperdown Country Park Wildlife Park, Former Walled Kitchen_Garden And Buildings Adjoining North Wall				56°28′54″N 3°02′43″W	Category C(S)	25102	Upload Photo
55 Constitution Road, Constitution House				56°27′50″N 2°58′33″W	Category C(S)	25103	Upload Photo
10 11 Albany Terr & 6 Law St With Boundary Walls & Gatepiers				56°28′02″N 2°59′06″W	Category B	24933	Upload Photo
203 Brook Street, Queen Victoria Works, Former Lower Pleasance Mill, Douglas Street (Now Twisting Dept)				56°27′44″N 2°59′14″W	Category B	24951	Upload Photo
Arbroath Road, Eastern Necropolis And North Lodge, 1, Old Craigie Road				56°28′19″N 2°56′10″W	Category B	24962	Upload Photo
Victoria Dock With Pedestrian And Vehicular Swing Bridges				56°27′42″N 2°57′35″W	Category A	24971	Upload another image See more images
4 Baldovan Road St Lukes Episcopal Church Downfield				56°29′40″N 2°59′43″W	Category B	24972	Upload Photo
Victoria Dock And Camperdown Street Transit Sheds Nos 26-30 (Inclusive)				56°27′44″N 2°57′38″W	Category B	24981	Upload Photo
2-10 (Even Nos) Barrack Road And 20-24 (Even Nos) Constitution Road, Garland Place, With Railings				56°27′52″N 2°58′37″W	Category B	24987	Upload Photo
Edward Street, Former Edward Street Mill				56°27′41″N 2°59′25″W	Category A	25003	Upload Photo
Guthrie Street South Side, With Return Elevations To Blinshall Street And Horsewater Wynd, D C Thomson's Warehouses				56°27′39″N 2°58′56″W	Category B	25015	Upload Photo
62 Arbroath Road, Taybank Works (Old Powerloom Factory, Calender And 3-Storey Mill Only, Tay Weavers Ltd)				56°28′09″N 2°57′13″W	Category B	24931	Upload Photo
Camperdown Street And Victoria Dock, Harbour, Or Clocktower, Warehouse				56°27′48″N 2°57′26″W	Category A	24932	Upload Photo

== Key ==
The scheme for classifying buildings in Scotland is:

- Category A: "buildings of national or international importance, either architectural or historic; or fine, little-altered examples of some particular period, style or building type."
- Category B: "buildings of regional or more than local importance; or major examples of some particular period, style or building type, which may have been altered."
- Category C: "buildings of local importance; lesser examples of any period, style, or building type, as originally constructed or moderately altered; and simple traditional buildings which group well with other listed buildings."

In March 2016 there were 47,288 listed buildings in Scotland. Of these, 8% were Category A, and 50% were Category B, with the remaining 42% being Category C.

== See also ==
- List of listed buildings in Dundee
