= Salem Chapel, Dundee =

Former church in Dundee, Scotland

Salem Chapel
- Salem Chapel
- 56°27′51″N 2°58′34″W
- Location: 6 Salem Street; Dundee
- Country: Scotland
- Denomination: United Reformed Church

History
- Status: Closed

Architecture
- Architect: William Alexander
- Completed: 1872; 154 years ago
- Closed: 24 November 2019

Listed Building – Category C(S)
- Official name: Salem Street, Salem Chapel Church of Christ
- Designated: 20 November 1981
- Reference no.: LB25470

Salem Chapel is a former United Reformed Church in Dundee, Scotland. Now a Category C listed building, it was built in 1872, to a design by newly appointed Dundee City Architect William Alexander.

The church, which was established in the city in 1839, held its first service in the building on 6 October 1872. It closed in 2019, after 147 years, holding its final service on 24 November.

== See also ==
- List of listed buildings in Dundee
