= Dundee City Chambers =

Municipal building in Dundee, Scotland

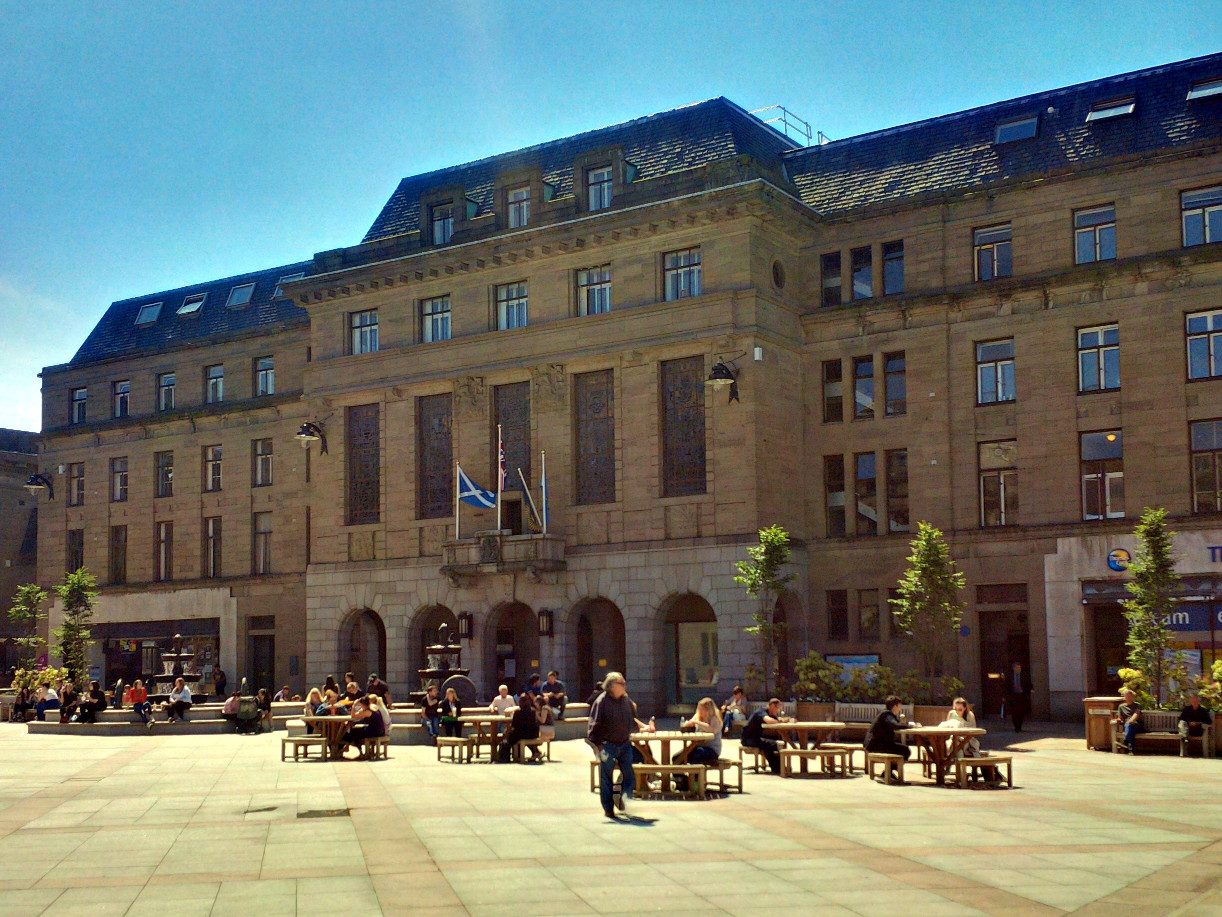
- Dundee City Chambers

- Shown in Dundee
- 56.4600°N 2.9698°W
- Location: Dundee

History
- Built: 1933

Site notes
- Architect(s): James McLellan Brown and Sir John James Burnet

Listed Building – Category B
- Designated: 30 March 1994
- Reference no.: LB25262

Dundee City Chambers is a municipal facility in City Square, Dundee, Scotland. The city chambers, which is headquarters of Dundee City Council, is a Category B listed building.

== History ==
The building was commissioned to replace the old town house in the High Street which had been designed by William Adam in the neoclassical style and completed in 1734. The design of the town house involved a symmetrical main frontage of seven bays facing onto the High Street. The central section of three bays was slightly projected forward and was pedimented and there was a central clock tower with a spire behind the pediment. The council chamber was at the west end of the building. After civic leaders decided they needed a more substantial town hall, commensurate with the increasing importance of the council in society, the old town house was demolished, in the face of some opposition, to make way for the west wing of the new building.

The new building, which was designed by the city architect, James McLellan Brown, based on sketches by Sir John James Burnet, was officially opened by the Prince George on 30 November 1933. The design involved a symmetrical frontage with seventeen bays facing onto City Square; the central section of five bays featured arcading for retail use on the ground floor, a stone balcony on the first floor and double-height windows on the first and second floors; there were small square windows on the third floor and a pavilion roof above. Internally, the principal room was the double-height council chamber on the first floor.

A series of stained class windows by Alex Russell of the Dundee College of Art were installed in the council chamber before it opened: the City Coat of Arms, William Wallace laying siege to Dundee Castle in 1297, Robert the Bruce granting a charter to Dundee in 1327, Mary, Queen of Scots receiving the keys of Dundee in 1561 and Bonnie Dundee on his way to the Battle of Killiecrankie in 1689. Chandeliers made from glass taken from the original chandeliers in the old town house were also installed in the council chamber. The east wing of the building, closest to the Caird Hall, was originally let to Burtons, but the upper floors were later brought back into council use as its accommodation requirements expanded.

A memorial to the local soldiers of the 51st (Highland) Division who had died in the First and Second World Wars was unveiled in the city chambers after the latter war.

The building was the headquarters of Dundee Corporation until it was replaced by Dundee District Council under the wider Tayside Regional Council in May 1975. It then remained the Dundee District Council headquarters until the abolition of the Tayside Region led to the formation of Dundee City Council in April 1996.

Queen Elizabeth II, accompanied by the Duke of Edinburgh, waved to the crowds from the balcony of the city chambers during a tour of the city in July 2016.

== See also ==
- List of listed buildings in Dundee/2
