= William Alexander (architect) =

Scottish architect (1841–1904)

- Born: 1841; Scotland
- Died: 11 May 1904 (aged 62–63)
- Occupation: Architect

William Alexander (1841 – 11 May 1904) was a Scottish architect, prominent in the late 19th century. His design genre mainly included tenement buildings and theatres, and he was focussed almost exclusively in the Tayside region. Several of the structures he built or worked on are today listed as Category A, Category B or Category C.

== Early life ==
Alexander was born in Dundee in 1841, the son of Charles Alexander, proprietor of the Dundee Courier.

== Career ==
Alexander was articled to brothers James and William McLaren. After spending time in Edinburgh, he set up business, back in his hometown, around 1865. By 1876, he had offices at 36 North Lindsay Street.

He was appointed Dundee City Architect in 1871 or 1872, beating James McLaren by five votes, after the death of William Scott. He remained in the role for over thirty years, until his death in 1904. He was succeeded after death by James Thomson.

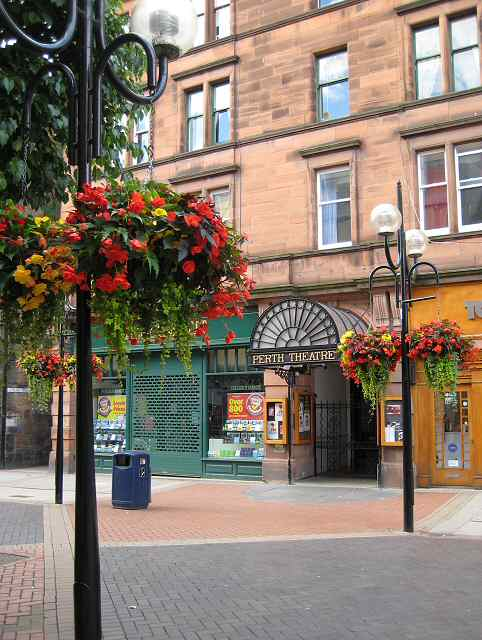
Perth Theatre, 2008

=== Selected notable works ===
The below are some of the structures built by Alexander; he altered or made additions to many more.

- Salem Chapel, Dundee (1872) – now Category C listed
- Victoria Chambers, Dundee (1874) – now Category B listed
- Park Brewery, Dundee (1881)
- Albert Institute, Dundee (1887) – now Category A listed; Alexander designed the Eastern Galleries and its Victoria Jubilee Gardens
- Perth Theatre (1900), now Category B listed

== Personal life ==
In his later years, Alexander was described as being "a big heavy man and latterly somewhat lame".

=== Death ===
Alexander died on 11 May 1904, aged about 63.
