= List of listed buildings in Dundee/6 =

This is a list of listed buildings in Dundee, Scotland.

== List ==
Name	Location	Date listed	Grid ref. (Note: Sometimes known as OSGB36, the grid reference (where provided) is based on the British national grid reference system used by the Ordnance Survey. • "Guide to National Grid". Ordnance Survey. • "Get-a-map". Ordnance Survey.)	Geo-coordinates	Notes	LB number (Note: Historic Environment Scotland assign a unique alphanumeric identifier to each designated site in Scotland, for listed buildings this always begins with "LB", for example "LB12345".)	Image
94, 96 High Street/52, 54 Commercial Street, Clydesdale Bank				56°27′41″N 2°58′07″W	Category B	25251	Upload Photo
9 Dudhope Terrace				56°27′58″N 2°59′04″W	Category B	25254	Upload Photo
Park Place, Carnelley Building, University Of Dundee, Including Boundary Walls				56°27′28″N 2°58′43″W	Category B	25266	Upload Photo
Finlathen Aqueduct				56°29′10″N 2°56′33″W	Category B	25284	Upload Photo
9, 11 Forfar Road Craigiemount And Noblestown Cottage				56°28′33″N 2°57′14″W	Category B	25299	Upload Photo
56 Small's Wynd, Old Medical School, Including Boundary Wall And Railings, University Of Dundee				56°27′28″N 2°58′46″W	Category B	25304	Upload Photo
146 Princes Street And Victoria Street				56°28′04″N 2°57′30″W	Category B	25306	Upload Photo
25A Forfar Road And Return To Walrond Street Maryfield Transport Depot				56°28′36″N 2°57′09″W	Category B	25307	Upload Photo
Claverhouse Road Or Mansion Drive, Mansion House				56°29′37″N 2°57′43″W	Category B	25116	Upload Photo
Claverhouse Road, Claverhouse Cottage, North				56°29′32″N 2°57′50″W	Category B	25123	Upload Photo
88 Victoria Road And Return Elevation To Forebank Road And Bonnybank Road, Bonnybank Apartments, Former Forebank Dyeworks (Front Block Only)				56°27′57″N 2°58′05″W	Category C(S)	25126	Upload Photo
11, 12, 13 Dock Street				56°27′33″N 2°58′09″W	Category C(S)	25142	Upload Photo
42, 44 West Henderson's Wynd And Elevation To Anchor Lane, Former South Anchor Mill				56°27′41″N 2°59′04″W	Category B	25148	Upload Photo
16 Constitution Terrace And Return To Constitution Street, Rose House With Boundary Walls				56°28′01″N 2°58′39″W	Category B	25172	Upload Photo
11-17 (Odd Nos) Exchange Street				56°27′38″N 2°58′01″W	Category C(S)	25196	Upload Photo
72 And 74 Constable Street				56°27′58″N 2°57′33″W	Category B	25197	Upload Photo
21-29 Cowgate, County Bingo, Former King's Theatre				56°27′49″N 2°58′03″W	Category B	25201	Upload Photo
51 Magdalen Yard Road, Former Tay Rope Works (Facade Only)				56°27′11″N 2°59′19″W	Category C(S)	25031	Upload Photo
230 Broughty Ferry Road With Railings				56°28′08″N 2°56′01″W	Category C(S)	25049	Upload Photo
9 Commercial Street				56°27′40″N 2°57′59″W	Category C(S)	25050	Upload Photo
17 Commercial Street				56°27′40″N 2°57′59″W	Category C(S)	25052	Upload Photo
Byron Street Ss Peter And Paul Rc Church And Presbytery				56°28′24″N 2°58′54″W	Category B	25054	Upload Photo
14 Milne's East Wynd And Milne's West Wynd Burnside Works				56°27′42″N 2°59′11″W	Category B	25081	Upload Photo
2 Princes Street, Upper Dens Mill				56°27′58″N 2°57′46″W	Category A	25101	Upload Photo
St Salvador Street And Return Elevations To Glamis Street And Main Street, Caldrum Works (Excluding East Mill And Warehouses)				56°28′17″N 2°58′16″W	Category B	25105	Upload Photo
10, 12 Constitution Road, Including Gatepiers And Railings				56°27′44″N 2°58′30″W	Category B	25110	Upload Photo
East Dock Street, Gates And Gatepiers At Entrances To Victoria Dock				56°27′43″N 2°57′46″W	Category C(S)	24942	Upload Photo
205 Brook Street, Lower Pleasance And Brewery Lane, The Coffin Mill, Logie Works				56°27′43″N 2°59′19″W	Category A	24956	Upload Photo
17 Bell Street/5 Royal Exchange Lane, Bonar House, High School of Dundee				56°27′49″N 2°58′17″W	Category B	24978	Upload Photo
44-56 (Even Nos) Bell Street, (Mercantile Buildings,) Including Building To Rear				56°27′48″N 2°58′23″W	Category C(S)	24988	Upload Photo
28, 30 Bingham Terrace				56°28′25″N 2°56′33″W	Category C(S)	25016	Upload Photo
Alexander Street And 46, 48 Dens Road, Hillbank, Or Blakey's Mill				56°28′13″N 2°57′53″W	Category B	24922	Upload Photo
117 Strathmartine Road, Frews Bar				56°28′30″N 2°58′48″W	Category C(S)	51106	Upload Photo
1 Hyndford Street, And 39, 41 Shaftesbury Road 'Hyndford Cottage', Now Shaftesbury Hotel, With Gate And Gatepiers				56°27′26″N 3°00′05″W	Category C(S)	44963	Upload Photo
69 Victoria Street, Former Victoria Street Church				56°28′04″N 2°57′39″W	Category B	44964	Upload Photo
West Ferry, 2A Ellieslea Road, Inveravon Including Conservatory, Wall And Gatepiers				56°28′14″N 2°53′32″W	Category C(S)	25935	Upload Photo
West Ferry, 61 Albany Road And 102 Strathern Road, Claremont, Including Boundary Wall, Gatepiers, Terrace Wall And Lamp Standards				56°28′22″N 2°53′31″W	Category B	25944	Upload Photo
West Ferry, 118 Strathern Road, Northwood Including Conservatory, Gatepiers, Enclosing Wall, Lamp Standard And Terrace Wall				56°28′21″N 2°53′22″W	Category B	25948	Upload Photo
West Ferry, 30 Victoria Road, Aystree Lodge, Coach House And Stables, Including Gatepiers				56°28′18″N 2°53′11″W	Category B	25951	Upload Photo
West Ferry, 42 Victoria Road, Deanscourt, Including Gatepiers And Boundary Wall, And Coach House				56°28′21″N 2°53′10″W	Category B	25952	Upload Photo
Magdalen Yard Road, Magdalen Green, K6 Telephone Kiosk				56°27′11″N 2°59′28″W	Category B	25959	Upload Photo
Broughty Ferry, 415 King Street, Gall's Cottage				56°27′54″N 2°52′08″W	Category C(S)	25848	Upload Photo
Broughty Ferry, 206 King Street And 29 Ambrose Street				56°27′57″N 2°52′31″W	Category C(S)	25850	Upload Photo
Broughty Ferry, 101 Monifieth Road, Reres Hill Park Lodge				56°28′12″N 2°51′25″W	Category C(S)	25857	Upload Photo
Broughty Ferry, 89 Queen Street, Brae Cottage				56°28′08″N 2°52′40″W	Category C(S)	25867	Upload Photo
Broughty Ferry, 164 Queen Street, St Mary's Episcopal Church, Including Boundary Wall And Gatepiers				56°28′06″N 2°52′37″W	Category B	25870	Upload Photo
Pitkerro, Kellas Road, Pitkerro Mill				56°29′25″N 2°53′35″W	Category C(S)	25898	Upload Photo
Stannergate, Lower Broughty Ferry Road, Orphanage Bridge				56°28′05″N 2°56′01″W	Category B	25901	Upload Photo
West Ferry, 36 Albany Road And 13 Fairfield Road, Craigmore, Including Gatepiers And Boundary Wall				56°28′15″N 2°54′05″W	Category C(S)	25905	Upload Photo
West Ferry, Craigie Avenue, Craigiebank Church Including Church Hall				56°28′17″N 2°55′43″W	Category B	25914	Upload Photo
West Ferry, Douglas Terrace, Railway Road Bridge				56°28′08″N 2°53′15″W	Category B	25919	Upload Photo
Broughty Ferry, Brook Street Congregational Church And Hall, Including Wall And Gatepiers				56°28′05″N 2°52′43″W	Category C(S)	25765	Upload Photo
Broughty Ferry, 391, 393 Brook Street				56°28′00″N 2°52′10″W	Category C(S)	25769	Upload Photo
Broughty Ferry, 408 Brook Street, St Aidans Church, Including Churchyard, Walls And Gatepiers				56°27′58″N 2°52′09″W	Category B	25773	Upload Photo
Broughty Ferry, 76 Camphill Road, And Enclosing Walls, The Bughties				56°28′15″N 2°51′41″W	Category B	25786	Upload Photo
Broughty Ferry, 6, 8 Forthill Road, Rosemount Including Boundary Wall				56°28′13″N 2°52′28″W	Category C(S)	25819	Upload Photo
Broughty Ferry, Gray Street, Railway Station, Including Covered Bridge, Subway, Signal Box And Level Crossing				56°28′03″N 2°52′24″W	Category A	25823	Upload Photo
Broughty Ferry, Gray Street, Cabmens' Shelter Adjoining Railway Station				56°28′03″N 2°52′23″W	Category C(S)	25824	Upload Photo
Broughty Ferry, 15 King Street				56°28′01″N 2°52′52″W	Category C(S)	25842	Upload Photo
4 St Peter's Street, St Peter's Church, Including Halls And Church Officer's House				56°27′23″N 2°59′28″W	Category B	25675	Upload Photo
6 West Grove Avenue, The Boreen, With Boundary Wall				56°27′29″N 3°00′55″W	Category B	25684	Upload Photo
Balmossie, Balmossie Mill				56°28′56″N 2°51′04″W	Category B	25737	Upload Photo
Broughty Ferry, 31 Beach Crescent, Including Wall And Gatepiers At King Street				56°27′54″N 2°52′23″W	Category B	25761	Upload Photo
24, 26, 28 Union Street				56°27′33″N 2°58′15″W	Category B	25590	Upload Photo
130 Perth Road, Dundee West Church (Latterly Roseangle Ryehill, And Formerly St John's Including Railings, Excluding Hall To West (Church Of Scotland)				56°27′22″N 2°58′56″W	Category B	25591	Upload Photo
156 Perth Road And 2 Greenfield Place, Greenfield House Including Railings				56°27′22″N 2°59′06″W	Category C(S)	25599	Upload Photo
29 Ward Road, Former Sheriff Court And Sheriff Clerk's Office				56°27′42″N 2°58′36″W	Category B	25606	Upload Photo
2 Ward Road, Barrack Street Museum				56°27′41″N 2°58′27″W	Category B	25610	Upload Photo
424-6 Perth Road, Including Railings				56°27′23″N 3°00′06″W	Category B	25611	Upload Photo
454A Perth Road, Former Binrock Lodge, Gatepiers And Boundary Wall				56°27′23″N 3°00′19″W	Category B	25619	Upload Photo
456 Perth Road, Binrock				56°27′20″N 3°00′23″W	Category B	25621	Upload Photo
510 Perth Road, Balgowan Including Boundary Walls And Gatepiers				56°27′23″N 3°01′13″W	Category C(S)	25636	Upload Photo
27 Roseangle With Boundary Walls				56°27′18″N 2°59′05″W	Category C(S)	25656	Upload Photo
22 Roseangle And Railings And Garden (Formerly Sea) Walls				56°27′18″N 2°59′01″W	Category B	25666	Upload Photo
26 Roseangle Including Iron Railings And Garden Walls				56°27′18″N 2°59′02″W	Category C(S)	25668	Upload Photo
16 Victoria Road, Ladywell Tavern, Former Victoria Brewery				56°27′53″N 2°58′17″W	Category B	25521	Upload Photo
267, 269 Perth Road And 38 Shaftesbury Road, With Boundary Walls				56°27′25″N 3°00′04″W	Category B	25547	Upload Photo
303 Perth Road The Cedars				56°27′25″N 3°00′20″W	Category B	25555	Upload Photo
365 Perth Road, Seathwood House, Lodge And Gatepiers				56°27′26″N 3°01′19″W	Category B	25571	Upload Photo
1-7 (Odd Nos) Union Street, 52-58 (Even Nos) Nethergate				56°27′33″N 2°58′18″W	Category B	25576	Upload Photo
162 Nethergate, Formerly Tayside House, Including Boundary Walls, Railings And Steps				56°27′25″N 2°58′35″W	Category B	25464	Upload Photo
507 Strathmartine Road, Strathmartine Parish Church (Church Of Scotland) With Railings				56°29′47″N 3°00′05″W	Category B	25491	Upload Photo
13, 14 Trottick Mains				56°29′31″N 2°58′15″W	Category C(S)	25500	Upload Photo
10 Panmure Street				56°27′48″N 2°58′10″W	Category B	25504	Upload Photo
4 Union Terrace, And Return To Constitution Terrace With Boundary Walls And Gatepiers				56°27′59″N 2°58′40″W	Category B	25509	Upload Photo
2, 4 Victoria Road, And 86 Bell Street, India Buildings				56°27′50″N 2°58′19″W	Category A	25515	Upload Photo
45 Murraygate				56°27′46″N 2°58′06″W	Category B	25362	Upload Photo
Blackness Avenue, Shaftesbury Avenue And Shaftesbury Terrace, Logie And St John's (Cross) Parish Church And Halls (Church Of Scotland)				56°27′27″N 2°59′49″W	Category B	25368	Upload Photo
Nethergate, City Churches, St Clement's, Or Steeple Church				56°27′34″N 2°58′23″W	Category A	25374	Upload another image
Nethergate, City Churches, Old St Paul's And St David's, Or South Church				56°27′34″N 2°58′21″W	Category A	25378	Upload Photo
1 Laurel Bank And 2 Dudhope Street With Boundary Walls And Gatepiers				56°27′53″N 2°58′36″W	Category B	25385	Upload Photo
93, 95, 97 Nethergate				56°27′29″N 2°58′29″W	Category B	25390	Upload Photo
133-139 (Odd Nos) Nethergate, Morgan Tower				56°27′26″N 2°58′34″W	Category A	25402	Upload another image
28 Cleghorn Street "The American Land"				56°27′52″N 2°59′45″W	Category C(S)	25404	Upload Photo
1 Glamis Road Duncraig Lodge And Gatepiers				56°27′28″N 3°01′20″W	Category B	25423	Upload Photo
68 And 69 High Street And 1 And 5 New Inn Entry, Including The Arctic Bar				56°27′39″N 2°58′11″W	Category B	25234	Upload Photo
4 Dudhope Terrace				56°28′00″N 2°58′57″W	Category B	25238	Upload Photo
74, 75 And 76 High Street				56°27′40″N 2°58′11″W	Category A	25243	Upload Photo
8 Dudhope Terrace				56°27′59″N 2°59′03″W	Category B	25250	Upload Photo
Off Perth Road, Geddes Quadrangle, Carnegie Building, University Of Dundee				56°27′26″N 2°58′50″W	Category B	25273	Upload Photo
15 Dudhope Terrace, Dudhope House				56°27′58″N 2°59′23″W	Category B	25276	Upload Photo
18 Park Avenue And Return To Morgan Street, Park Church (Of Scotland)				56°28′17″N 2°57′20″W	Category B	25294	Upload Photo
Constitution Road, St Mary Magdalene's Episcopal Church, Including Hall, Boundary Wall And Railings				56°27′51″N 2°58′37″W	Category B	25113	Upload Photo
60 Victoria Road, The Victoria Road Calender (A And S Henry's)				56°27′56″N 2°58′09″W	Category B	25122	Upload Photo
Claverhouse Road, Claverhouse Cottages, South (Bowfronted Cottage)				56°29′31″N 2°57′50″W	Category B	25127	Upload Photo
371 Clepington Road Clepington Sluice Chamber				56°28′44″N 2°59′24″W	Category B	25137	Upload Photo
Euclid Crescent, High School of Dundee, Including Lodge, Gatepiers, Boundary Wall And Railings				56°27′47″N 2°58′23″W	Category A	25177	Upload another image
2 Euclid Crescent, Meadowside Gospel Hall				56°27′48″N 2°58′20″W	Category C(S)	25181	Upload Photo
3 Douglas Terrace With Boundary Walls And Gatepiers				56°28′00″N 2°59′08″W	Category B	25188	Upload Photo
29-33 (Odd Nos) Exchange Street				56°27′39″N 2°58′00″W	Category C(S)	25199	Upload Photo
14-18 (Even Nos) Exchange Street				56°27′38″N 2°58′03″W	Category B	25203	Upload Photo
Camperdown Country Park (To Liff Road) South Lodge				56°28′41″N 3°02′24″W	Category B	25094	Upload Photo
Camperdown Street, Railings, Gates And Gatepiers Between Harbour Warehouse And Transit Shed 25				56°27′48″N 2°57′25″W	Category B	24937	Upload Photo
23 Albany Terrace With Boundary Walls And Gatepiers				56°28′01″N 2°59′16″W	Category C(S)	24943	Upload Photo
5 Bank Street				56°27′41″N 2°58′19″W	Category B	24949	Upload Photo
Marine Parade, Former Panmure Shipyard, (Wm R Stewart And Sons)				56°27′36″N 2°57′37″W	Category B	24952	Upload Photo
Railway Bridge, Burnside Street, Wellbank Lane, Camperdown Works				56°28′18″N 3°00′18″W	Category B	24980	Upload Photo
80-100 Cowgate, East Port Calender Works				56°27′54″N 2°57′52″W	Category B	24990	Upload Photo
Baxter Park Pavilion, Steps, Boundary Walls And Gatepiers				56°28′20″N 2°57′03″W	Category A	24992	Upload another image See more images
1 Dura Street And Return Elevations To Dens Road, Cowan Street And Brown Constable Street, Dura Works (Excluding Single-Storey Rear)				56°28′10″N 2°57′47″W	Category B	24999	Upload Photo
1-3 (Inclusive) Baxter Park Terrace And Return Elevation To Pitkerro Road				56°28′25″N 2°57′15″W	Category B	25000	Upload Photo
6 Bingham Terrace Tillydrine, With Boundary Walls And Garage				56°28′23″N 2°56′47″W	Category B	25008	Upload Photo
Camperdown Dock				56°27′48″N 2°57′14″W	Category A	24923	Upload another image
123-129 (Odd Nos) Perth Road, Tay Bridge Bar				56°27′22″N 2°59′29″W	Category C(S)	51279	Upload Photo
Loon's Road, North Tay Centre				56°28′20″N 2°59′51″W	Category B	51587	Upload Photo

== Key ==
The scheme for classifying buildings in Scotland is:

- Category A: "buildings of national or international importance, either architectural or historic; or fine, little-altered examples of some particular period, style or building type."
- Category B: "buildings of regional or more than local importance; or major examples of some particular period, style or building type, which may have been altered."
- Category C: "buildings of local importance; lesser examples of any period, style, or building type, as originally constructed or moderately altered; and simple traditional buildings which group well with other listed buildings."

In March 2016 there were 47,288 listed buildings in Scotland. Of these, 8% were Category A, and 50% were Category B, with the remaining 42% being Category C.

== See also ==
- List of listed buildings in Dundee
