= List of listed buildings in Dundee/4 =

This is a list of listed buildings in Dundee, Scotland.

== List ==
| Name | Location | Date listed | Grid ref. (Note: Sometimes known as OSGB36, the grid reference (where provided) is based on the British national grid reference system used by the Ordnance Survey. • "Guide to National Grid". Ordnance Survey. • "Get-a-map". Ordnance Survey.) | Geo-coordinates | Notes | LB number (Note: Historic Environment Scotland assign a unique alphanumeric identifier to each designated site in Scotland, for listed buildings this always begins with "LB", for example "LB12345".) | Image |
|---|---|---|---|---|---|---|---|
| 5 Magdalen Place, Magdalen Hotel | | | | 56°27′15″N 2°59′13″W | Category C(S) | 25459 | Upload Photo |
| 43 Magdalen Yard Road, "The Vine", Including Garden Walls And Gatepiers | | | | 56°27′12″N 2°59′13″W | Category A | 25469 | Upload Photo |
| 8 Salem Street, Salem Cottage | | | | 56°27′51″N 2°58′32″W | Category C(S) | 25473 | Upload Photo |
| 55 Magdalen Yard Road And Garden Ornaments | | | | 56°27′13″N 2°59′22″W | Category B | 25475 | Upload Photo |
| 1, 2 Somerville Place With Boundary Walls | | | | 56°28′00″N 2°58′50″W | Category B | 25476 | Upload Photo |
| 3 And 4 Somerville Place And Detached Former Billiard Room At 2-6 (Even Nos) Upper Constitution Street And Boundary Walls To Upper Constitution Street And Somerville Place | | | | 56°28′01″N 2°58′47″W | Category B | 25479 | Upload Photo |
| 67 Magdalen Yard Road, The Shrubbery | | | | 56°27′13″N 2°59′33″W | Category B | 25487 | Upload Photo |
| 2-6 (Even Nos) Panmure Street, Meadowside, Former Union Bank Of Scotland | | | | 56°27′48″N 2°58′13″W | Category B | 25498 | Upload Photo |
| Rattray Street, Former Baptist Church | | | | 56°27′43″N 2°58′34″W | Category B | 25516 | Upload Photo |
| 1 South George Street, 15 And 15A Nelson Street | | | | 56°28′02″N 2°58′04″W | Category B | 25333 | Upload Photo |
| Harestane Road, Bridge | | | | 56°29′44″N 2°59′12″W | Category C(S) | 25334 | Upload Photo |
| 93, 95 High Street, Lochee And Return Elevation To Burnside Street, Clydesdale Bank Ltd | | | | 56°28′19″N 3°00′33″W | Category B | 25353 | Upload Photo |
| 365 Blackness Road With Boundary Walls And Gatepiers | | | | 56°27′36″N 3°00′54″W | Category B | 25380 | Upload Photo |
| Kingsway West Camperdown Van Leer Factory (Formerly Ncr) | | | | 56°28′54″N 3°01′25″W | Category B | 25381 | Upload Photo |
| 430 Blackness Road, "Braeknowe" With Boundary Walls | | | | 56°27′32″N 3°01′07″W | Category C(S) | 25388 | Upload Photo |
| 99-103 (Odd Nos) Nethergate, 1 Tay Street Lane | | | | 56°27′29″N 2°58′30″W | Category C(S) | 25394 | Upload Photo |
| 8 Dudhope Street With Boundary Walls And Gatepiers | | | | 56°27′54″N 2°58′32″W | Category C(S) | 25214 | Upload Photo |
| 5 Dudhope Terrace | | | | 56°27′59″N 2°58′58″W | Category B | 25242 | Upload Photo |
| 113 Hilltown, And 1, 3 Ann Street, Including The Windmill Bar | | | | 56°28′01″N 2°58′20″W | Category B | 25256 | Upload Photo |
| Park Place, Scrymgeour Building, University Of Dundee, Including Boundary Walls And Railings | | | | 56°27′29″N 2°58′41″W | Category B | 25269 | Upload another image |
| 11-19 (Odd Nos) North Ellen Street, "The Faces Land" | | | | 56°28′12″N 2°58′07″W | Category B | 25291 | Upload Photo |
| 13-19 (Odd Nos) Forfar Road | | | | 56°28′34″N 2°57′13″W | Category C(S) | 25303 | Upload Photo |
| 5, 7, 9 Cowgate/75-79 (Odd Nos) Murraygate, Baldragon House | | | | 56°27′48″N 2°58′06″W | Category B | 25117 | Upload Photo |
| 2 Wallace Street And 2 Broughty Ferry Road, Wallace Craigie Works | | | | 56°27′59″N 2°57′28″W | Category B | 25132 | Upload Photo |
| West Henderson's Wynd, Douglas Court, Former Douglas Mill On Milne's East Wynd, Near Douglas Street | | | | 56°27′44″N 2°59′09″W | Category B | 25156 | Upload Photo |
| Constitution Street, Rosebank Church With Boundary Walls And Gatepiers | | | | 56°28′02″N 2°58′37″W | Category B | 25157 | Upload Photo |
| Arbroath Road, 60 Taybank Works, Tay Spinners Ltd | | | | 56°28′10″N 2°57′18″W | Category B | 25175 | Upload Photo |
| 24 Euclid Crescent, High School, (Former Girls' School) | | | | 56°27′45″N 2°58′27″W | Category A | 25189 | Upload Photo |
| 1 Drummond Street With Boundary Walls | | | | 56°28′03″N 2°58′53″W | Category C(S) | 25192 | Upload Photo |
| Dudhope Castle, Well | | | | 56°27′51″N 2°59′03″W | Category B | 25198 | Upload Photo |
| 1-5 (Odd Nos) Dudhope Street And 63-69 (Odd Nos) Constitution Road, Rustic Place | | | | 56°27′52″N 2°58′34″W | Category B | 25202 | Upload Photo |
| 2 Lochee Road, Tay Works | | | | 56°27′44″N 2°58′45″W | Category A | 25030 | Upload Photo |
| 12 Bright Street Lochee Baptist Church | | | | 56°28′26″N 3°00′38″W | Category C(S) | 25035 | Upload Photo |
| 40 Castle Street, Former Stewart's Distillers' Office Entrance | | | | 56°27′38″N 2°58′04″W | Category B | 25036 | Upload Photo |
| Methven Street, Camperdown Works, Calender Block | | | | 56°28′24″N 3°00′32″W | Category B | 25048 | Upload Photo |
| 240 And 242 Broughty Ferry Road | | | | 56°28′07″N 2°55′56″W | Category C(S) | 25051 | Upload Photo |
| Methven Street, Camperdown Works, Offices, Lodge And Gate | | | | 56°28′23″N 3°00′28″W | Category B | 25053 | Upload Photo |
| Caird Park Mains Castle | | | | 56°29′08″N 2°57′29″W | Category A | 25066 | Upload another image |
| Methven Street, Camperdown Works, Jute Warehouses Nos 1-4 (By Former Railway) | | | | 56°28′19″N 3°00′19″W | Category B | 25069 | Upload Photo |
| Caird Park, Old Mains Churchyard With Graham Of Fintry Vault | | | | 56°29′10″N 2°57′29″W | Category C(S) | 25070 | Upload Photo |
| 12 Milnbank Road (Aimer's Ltd) | | | | 56°27′43″N 2°59′28″W | Category B | 25077 | Upload Photo |
| 20 Commercial Street, Iron Warehouse | | | | 56°27′40″N 2°58′03″W | Category B | 25087 | Upload Photo |
| Camperdown Country Park Sawmill, Workshops, Formerly Stables | | | | 56°29′04″N 3°02′46″W | Category B | 25090 | Upload Photo |
| 11-13 Princes Street And Return Elevation To Dens Street With Gate | | | | 56°27′57″N 2°57′44″W | Category C(S) | 25097 | Upload Photo |
| Camperdown Country Park West Lodge And Gates | | | | 56°29′03″N 3°03′02″W | Category B | 25098 | Upload Photo |
| Albert Square, Statue Of George Kinloch | | | | 56°27′46″N 2°58′19″W | Category B | 24934 | Upload another image |
| 22 Albany Terrace With Boundary Walls And Gatepiers | | | | 56°28′01″N 2°59′15″W | Category C(S) | 24938 | Upload Photo |
| 45 Ancrum Road Ancrum Rd Primary School & Janitors House | | | | 56°28′09″N 3°00′31″W | Category B | 24953 | Upload Photo |
| 20 Brown Street, And Return Elevations To 8 Guthrie Street, And Session Street, South Mills | | | | 56°27′38″N 2°58′47″W | Category A | 24965 | Upload Photo |
| 3 Bell Street, Abertay University, Former James Church | | | | 56°27′46″N 2°58′27″W | Category B | 24968 | Upload Photo |
| Victoria Dock, South Shed (Consortium Conservation Ltd) | | | | 56°27′46″N 2°57′25″W | Category B | 24976 | Upload Photo |
| 40 Bell Street, Abertay University, Including Former Boiler House And North Wing | | | | 56°27′49″N 2°58′26″W | Category B | 24983 | Upload Photo |
| Victoria Dock, East Graving Or Dry Dock And Pump House | | | | 56°27′44″N 2°57′24″W | Category B | 24986 | Upload Photo |
| Castle Hill, South West Corner Of Commercial Street And High Street, Castle Hill House, Including Boundary Wall | | | | 56°27′40″N 2°58′04″W | Category A | 24993 | Upload Photo |
| Castle Hill, St Paul's Episcopal Cathedral, Including Steps And Boundary Wall | | | | 56°27′39″N 2°58′05″W | Category A | 24997 | Upload Photo |
| 23, 25 Castle Street | | | | 56°27′38″N 2°58′07″W | Category C(S) | 25005 | Upload Photo |
| 2, 3 Albany Terrace With Boundary Walls And Gatepiers | | | | 56°28′03″N 2°58′57″W | Category C(S) | 24929 | Upload Photo |
| Brook Street, St Aidan's Church Hall, Former East School | | | | 56°27′58″N 2°52′11″W | Category C(S) | 50904 | Upload Photo |
| West Ferry, 87 And 89 Dundee Road, Bryans, Including Boundary Wall And Gatepiers | | | | 56°28′13″N 2°53′45″W | Category B | 25925 | Upload Photo |
| West Ferry, 17 Fairfield Road, Red Court Including Sundial, Lamp Standard, Gatepiers, Boundary And Garden Walls | | | | 56°28′19″N 2°54′02″W | Category A | 25938 | Upload Photo |
| West Ferry, 17 Fairfield Road, Red Court Laundry | | | | 56°28′19″N 2°54′07″W | Category C(S) | 25941 | Upload Photo |
| West Ferry, 26 Victoria Road, Aystree, Including Conservatory, Wall And Gatepiers | | | | 56°28′16″N 2°53′10″W | Category A | 25950 | Upload Photo |
| 1 Hazel Drive | | | | 56°27′33″N 3°01′35″W | Category B | 25958 | Upload Photo |
| Broughty Ferry, 81 Monifieth Road, Bartley Lodge, Including Boundary Wall, Gatepiers And Entrance Gateway | | | | 56°28′10″N 2°51′37″W | Category B | 25856 | Upload Photo |
| Broughty Ferry, 51 Queen Street, (Formerly) Kingsway Bingo, Regal Cinema And Volunteer Hall | | | | 56°28′09″N 2°52′45″W | Category B | 25866 | Upload Photo |
| Broughty Ferry, 9 West Queen Street, Falcon Lodge, Including Boundary Wall | | | | 56°28′10″N 2°52′55″W | Category B | 25886 | Upload Photo |
| Pitkerro, Pitkerro House, Including Garden Walls And Ruined Dovecot | | | | 56°29′33″N 2°53′22″W | Category A | 25895 | Upload Photo |
| Broughty Ferry, 383 Brook Street | | | | 56°28′00″N 2°52′12″W | Category C(S) | 25768 | Upload Photo |
| Broughty Ferry, 35 Camperdown Street, Including Wall And Gatepiers, Cyandy | | | | 56°28′11″N 2°52′35″W | Category B | 25776 | Upload Photo |
| Broughty Ferry, 4, 6 Dundas Street, Braehead House | | | | 56°27′56″N 2°52′43″W | Category B | 25791 | Upload Photo |
| Broughty Ferry, 10 Fort Street And 4 Bell's Lane Fisherman's Tavern | | | | 56°27′55″N 2°52′37″W | Category C(S) | 25811 | Upload Photo |
| Broughty Ferry, 4 Forthill Road, Hillside, And 1B Hill Street, Hillfoot, Including Boundary Wall And Gatepiers | | | | 56°28′12″N 2°52′30″W | Category C(S) | 25818 | Upload Photo |
| Broughty Ferry, 4 Hill Street, With Wall And Gatepiers | | | | 56°28′10″N 2°52′27″W | Category C(S) | 25840 | Upload Photo |
| St Peter's Street And Perth Road, St Peter's Churchyard Including Mccheyne Monument | | | | 56°27′22″N 2°59′27″W | Category C(S) | 25676 | Upload Photo |
| 8 Tait's Lane | | | | 56°27′26″N 2°59′39″W | Category B | 25680 | Upload Photo |
| Tay Railway Bridge | | | | 56°26′20″N 2°59′19″W | Category A | 25681 | Upload Photo |
| Balmossie, Road Bridge Over Dichty Water | | | | 56°28′53″N 2°51′04″W | Category B | 25738 | Upload another image |
| Broughty Ferry, 6 Bath Street, Gowan Lea | | | | 56°27′55″N 2°52′28″W | Category C(S) | 25756 | Upload Photo |
| Broughty Ferry, 8 Bath Street | | | | 56°27′55″N 2°52′28″W | Category C(S) | 25757 | Upload Photo |
| 30, 32, 34 Union Street | | | | 56°27′33″N 2°58′14″W | Category B | 25592 | Upload Photo |
| 140 Perth Road | | | | 56°27′22″N 2°58′59″W | Category B | 25593 | Upload Photo |
| 152-4 Perth Road (Formerly Valentine's) | | | | 56°27′22″N 2°59′05″W | Category C(S) | 25597 | Upload Photo |
| 15, 17, 19 Ward Road, Former Methodist Church And Adjoining Offices, Including Steps And Railings | | | | 56°27′42″N 2°58′33″W | Category C(S) | 25602 | Upload Photo |
| 328 Perth Road, Mccheyne Memorial Church | | | | 56°27′22″N 2°59′44″W | Category A | 25603 | Upload another image See more images |
| 444, 446 Perth Road, Taygrove And Riversdale, With Boundary Walls And Gatepiers | | | | 56°27′23″N 3°00′12″W | Category B | 25615 | Upload Photo |
| 17, 19 And 21 Whitehall Crescent | | | | 56°27′32″N 2°58′13″W | Category B | 25643 | Upload Photo |
| 11 Rockfield Crescent With Boundary Walls | | | | 56°27′32″N 3°00′15″W | Category B | 25648 | Upload Photo |
| 5 And 7 Whitehall Street, Palace Buildings | | | | 56°27′34″N 2°58′14″W | Category B | 25659 | Upload Photo |
| 4, 6 Roseangle With Railings And Boundary Walls | | | | 56°27′22″N 2°58′54″W | Category C(S) | 25662 | Upload Photo |
| 2 And 4 Whitehall Street, 4 And 6 Nethergate | | | | 56°27′35″N 2°58′15″W | Category B | 25663 | Upload Photo |
| 8 Roseangle With Railings And Boundary Walls | | | | 56°27′21″N 2°58′55″W | Category C(S) | 25664 | Upload Photo |
| 6-12 (Even Nos) Whitehall Street | | | | 56°27′35″N 2°58′14″W | Category B | 25665 | Upload Photo |
| 28 Roseangle Including Front Railings And Rear Garden Sea Wall | | | | 56°27′17″N 2°59′03″W | Category C(S) | 25670 | Upload Photo |
| 36 Roseangle Including Front Railings And Rear Sea Wall (Excluding Large Addition At Ne) | | | | 56°27′16″N 2°59′05″W | Category C(S) | 25672 | Upload Photo |
| 11 Perth Road | | | | 56°27′24″N 2°58′53″W | Category C(S) | 25523 | Upload Photo |
| 276 Clepington Road, Former Dundee, And Newtyle Railway Station, Or Laing's Cottage | | | | 56°28′42″N 2°59′18″W | Category C(S) | 25540 | Upload Photo |
| 45, 47 South Tay Street | | | | 56°27′32″N 2°58′36″W | Category C(S) | 25556 | Upload Photo |
| 20, 22 South Tay Street | | | | 56°27′30″N 2°58′35″W | Category B | 25564 | Upload Photo |
| 329 Perth Road Fernbrae, House And Lodge, Boundary Walls And Gatepiers | | | | 56°27′27″N 3°00′50″W | Category C(S) | 25567 | Upload Photo |
| 34, 36 South Tay Street Hermon Evangelical Church | | | | 56°27′31″N 2°58′37″W | Category C(S) | 25568 | Upload Photo |
| 385 Perth Road, 4 Hazel Avenue, Inniscarra Including Boundary Walls | | | | 56°27′31″N 3°01′45″W | Category B | 25575 | Upload Photo |
| 4, 6 Prospect Place, With Gatepiers And Boundary Walls | | | | 56°27′57″N 2°58′38″W | Category B | 25463 | Upload Photo |
| 166 Nethergate, Including Boundary Walls And Garden Terracing | | | | 56°27′24″N 2°58′37″W | Category B | 25471 | Upload Photo |
| 61 Magdalen Yard Road | | | | 56°27′12″N 2°59′29″W | Category B | 25481 | Upload Photo |
| 38 North Lindsay Street, 8-12 (Even Nos) South Ward Road, Former Halley Brothers' Works | | | | 56°27′37″N 2°58′32″W | Category B | 25489 | Upload Photo |
| 69 Magdalen Yard Road | | | | 56°27′13″N 2°59′35″W | Category C(S) | 25490 | Upload Photo |
| Magdalen Yard Road, Magdalen Green Bandstand | | | | 56°27′11″N 2°59′41″W | Category A | 25499 | Upload another image See more images |
| Panmure Street, Royal Exchange Lane, Royal Exchange | | | | 56°27′48″N 2°58′15″W | Category A | 25507 | Upload another image |
| Panmure Street, Guardian Royal Exchange | | | | 56°27′47″N 2°58′17″W | Category B | 25510 | Upload another image |
| 21 Meadowside Or Albert Square | | | | 56°27′45″N 2°58′12″W | Category B | 25320 | Upload Photo |
| Graham Street St Teresa's Formerly St Michael's Rc Church | | | | 56°28′43″N 2°58′06″W | Category B | 25322 | Upload Photo |
| 31 Meadowside Or Albert Square | | | | 56°27′46″N 2°58′12″W | Category B | 25323 | Upload Photo |
| 138, 140 Seagate And Return Elevation To Queen Street, Magnum House, Former Scws Store | | | | 56°27′51″N 2°57′54″W | Category B | 25329 | Upload Photo |
| 49 Meadowside | | | | 56°27′49″N 2°58′13″W | Category B | 25331 | Upload Photo |
| Balgay Park, Footbridge Between Balgay Hill And The Western Necropolis | | | | 56°27′53″N 3°00′52″W | Category B | 25356 | Upload Photo |
| Blackness Road, Harris Academy Annexe, Former Logie Central School, And Janitor's House And Gate Piers | | | | 56°27′40″N 2°59′49″W | Category B | 25372 | Upload Photo |
| Blackness Road, Parkview School, Lodge, Boundary Walls And Railings | | | | 56°27′39″N 3°00′28″W | Category B | 25376 | Upload Photo |
| 7 Farington Terrace Farington | | | | 56°27′29″N 3°00′59″W | Category B | 25408 | Upload Photo |
| 36 Nethergate | | | | 56°27′34″N 2°58′16″W | Category B | 25418 | Upload Photo |
| 80, 82 Nethergate | | | | 56°27′32″N 2°58′20″W | Category B | 25421 | Upload Photo |
| 66, 67 High Street | | | | 56°27′39″N 2°58′12″W | Category B | 25230 | Upload Photo |
| 26 East Dock Maritime House, Dundee, Perth And London Shipping Co | | | | 56°27′44″N 2°57′49″W | Category B | 25232 | Upload Photo |
| 42 East Dock Street, Retail Park, Unit 7, Former Dundee Foundry Engine Shop | | | | 56°27′50″N 2°57′40″W | Category B | 25236 | Upload Photo |
| 7 Dudhope Terrace And 1 Law Street | | | | 56°27′59″N 2°59′01″W | Category C(S) | 25246 | Upload Photo |
| 1, 3 King Street And Return To Cowgate | | | | 56°27′51″N 2°58′02″W | Category B | 25267 | Upload Photo |
| Forfar Road, Morgan Academy, Main Block And Janitor's House, With Terrace, Boundary Walls And Gatepiers | | | | 56°28′28″N 2°57′15″W | Category A | 25288 | Upload another image |
| Off Perth Road, Geddes Quadrangle, Sundial, University Of Dundee | | | | 56°27′27″N 2°58′49″W | Category B | 25293 | Upload another image |
| Claverhouse Road Mains Of Claverhouse With Railings | | | | 56°29′29″N 2°57′49″W | Category C(S) | 25119 | Upload Photo |
| 15-19 (Odd Nos) Crichton Street | | | | 56°27′35″N 2°58′12″W | Category C(S) | 25131 | Upload Photo |
| 92-98 (Even Nos) Clepington Road, Including The Clep Public House | | | | 56°28′38″N 2°58′07″W | Category B | 25145 | Upload Photo |
| 14 Dock Street, Lampstandard | | | | 56°27′33″N 2°58′08″W | Category C(S) | 25146 | Upload Photo |
| 50, 52 Albert Street, 2-6 (Even Nos) Arthurstone Terrace | | | | 56°28′09″N 2°57′29″W | Category B | 25164 | Upload Photo |
| Constitution Terrace 6, 8, 10 And 76, 78, 80 Constitution Street Including Boundary Walls And Gatepiers | | | | 56°28′00″N 2°58′42″W | Category B | 25165 | Upload Photo |
| 54, 55 Dock Street/1, 3 Gellatly Street | | | | 56°27′41″N 2°57′54″W | Category B | 25166 | Upload Photo |
| Albert Street Ogilvie Church (Church Of Scotland) | | | | 56°28′20″N 2°57′25″W | Category B | 25171 | Upload Photo |
| 56, 58 Arbroath Road, 1 Kemback Street | | | | 56°28′06″N 2°57′19″W | Category B | 25179 | Upload Photo |
| 3 Arthurstone Terrace And 1, 3, 5 Maitland Street, St Patrick's Rc Church, Presbytery And Hall | | | | 56°28′11″N 2°57′31″W | Category B | 25183 | Upload Photo |
| 80 North Lindsay Street, 29, 31 South Ward Road And Return Elevation To Johnston Street, Lindsay Street Mill | | | | 56°27′39″N 2°58′37″W | Category B | 25085 | Upload Photo |
| 29 Paterson Street And Return Elevation To Milton Street, Lawside Works (2-Storey And Attic Former Mill At Corner Of Paterson And Milton Streets Only) | | | | 56°28′26″N 2°58′55″W | Category B | 25089 | Upload Photo |
| Albert Square, Statue Of Queen Victoria | | | | 56°27′46″N 2°58′17″W | Category B | 24944 | Upload another image |
| 17 Ancrum Road St Margaret's Episcopal Church | | | | 56°28′09″N 3°00′19″W | Category B | 24948 | Upload Photo |
| 56 Barrack Street, Willison House | | | | 56°27′39″N 2°58′25″W | Category B | 24963 | Upload another image |
| 27, 29 Castle Street | | | | 56°27′38″N 2°58′06″W | Category C(S) | 25009 | Upload Photo |
| Barnhill, 15 Panmure Terrace, Rowanlee Including Boundary Wall | | | | 56°28′28″N 2°51′02″W | Category C(S) | 51133 | Upload Photo |
| 60 Dock Street, Including 1/L, 2/L And Top Floor Flats (Accessed From And Known As 59 Dock Street) | | | | 56°27′42″N 2°57′53″W | Category C(S) | 51353 | Upload Photo |
| West Ferry, 26 Dundee Road, Harecraig House, Including Wall At Dundee Road | | | | 56°28′10″N 2°53′44″W | Category B | 25927 | Upload Photo |
| West Ferry, 47 Grove Road, Claremont Lodge, Including Wall And Gatepiers | | | | 56°28′20″N 2°53′29″W | Category B | 25943 | Upload Photo |
| West Ferry,1 Ralston Road, Sunningdale, Including Enclosing Walls And Garage | | | | 56°28′07″N 2°54′26″W | Category B | 25946 | Upload Photo |
| 5 Annfield Street And 10 Blackness Street, Annfield House With Boundary Wall | | | | 56°27′35″N 2°59′35″W | Category B | 25955 | Upload Photo |
| Broughty Ferry, 63, 65, 67 And 69 Monifieth Road And 1 And 3 Norrie Street | | | | 56°28′06″N 2°51′52″W | Category C(S) | 25854 | Upload Photo |

== Key ==
The scheme for classifying buildings in Scotland is:

- Category A: "buildings of national or international importance, either architectural or historic; or fine, little-altered examples of some particular period, style or building type."
- Category B: "buildings of regional or more than local importance; or major examples of some particular period, style or building type, which may have been altered."
- Category C: "buildings of local importance; lesser examples of any period, style, or building type, as originally constructed or moderately altered; and simple traditional buildings which group well with other listed buildings."

In March 2016 there were 47,288 listed buildings in Scotland. Of these, 8% were Category A, and 50% were Category B, with the remaining 42% being Category C.

== See also ==
- List of listed buildings in Dundee
