= List of listed buildings in Liff And Benvie, Dundee =

This is a list of listed buildings in the parish of Liff And Benvie in Dundee, Scotland.

== List ==
Name	Location	Date listed	Grid ref. (Note: Sometimes known as OSGB36, the grid reference (where provided) is based on the British national grid reference system used by the Ordnance Survey. • "Guide to National Grid". Ordnance Survey. • "Get-a-map". Ordnance Survey.)	Geo-coordinates	Notes	LB number (Note: Historic Environment Scotland assign a unique alphanumeric identifier to each designated site in Scotland, for listed buildings this always begins with "LB", for example "LB12345".)	Image
Benvie Road Bridge Over Fowlis Burn Near Grayburn House				56°28′24″N 3°05′39″W	Category C(S)	12854	Upload Photo
Royal Dundee Liff Hospital, Main Gate Lodge, Including Gatepiers				56°29′02″N 3°04′09″W	Category C(S)	47566	Upload Photo
New Mill Of Gray Road Bridge Over Lochee Burn				56°28′11″N 3°04′02″W	Category C(S)	13225	Upload Photo
Technology Park Prospect Business Centre Formerly The Gows Including Gatepiers				56°27′43″N 3°03′09″W	Category B	13226	Upload Photo
Royal Dundee Liff Hospital, Liff House				56°28′53″N 3°03′53″W	Category C(S)	47564	Upload Photo
Royal Dundee Liff Hospital, Gowrie House				56°28′49″N 3°04′00″W	Category B	47567	Upload Photo
Benvie Grayburn House Including Enclosing Walls				56°28′25″N 3°05′35″W	Category B	12853	Upload Photo
Gray House Also Known As House Of Gray				56°28′35″N 3°04′36″W	Category A	12858	Upload another image
Benvie Road Bridge Over Fowlis Near Benvie Mill				56°28′16″N 3°05′34″W	Category C(S)	12855	Upload Photo
Royal Dundee Liff Hospital, Greystanes House				56°28′58″N 3°04′09″W	Category B	47568	Upload Photo
Royal Dundee Liff Hospital, Unit Offices				56°28′59″N 3°04′02″W	Category C(S)	47565	Upload Photo
Benvie Benvie Church Ruin And Churchyard				56°28′13″N 3°05′30″W	Category B	10862	Upload Photo
Benvie Benvie Mill Including House				56°28′15″N 3°05′32″W	Category A	10864	Upload Photo

== Key ==
The scheme for classifying buildings in Scotland is:

- Category A: "buildings of national or international importance, either architectural or historic; or fine, little-altered examples of some particular period, style or building type."
- Category B: "buildings of regional or more than local importance; or major examples of some particular period, style or building type, which may have been altered."
- Category C: "buildings of local importance; lesser examples of any period, style, or building type, as originally constructed or moderately altered; and simple traditional buildings which group well with other listed buildings."

In March 2016 there were 47,288 listed buildings in Scotland. Of these, 8% were Category A, and 50% were Category B, with the remaining 42% being Category C.

== See also ==
- List of listed buildings in Dundee
