= Victoria Chambers, Dundee =

Victoria Chambers
- Shown in Dundee
- 56.46444°N 2.971765°W
- Location: 10–14 Victoria Road, Dundee

History
- Built: 1874; 152 years ago

Site notes
- Architect: William Alexander

Listed Building – Category B
- Designated: 12 March 1993
- Reference no.: LB25518

Victoria Chambers is a commercial building on Victoria Street in Dundee, Scotland. Designed by newly appointed Dundee City Architect William Alexander, it is a Category B listed building dating to 1874.

Cleaning work performed in the 1950s softened the building's stonework detail somewhat.

The building is now halls for students of the Abertay University.

== See also ==
- List of listed buildings in Dundee
