= List of listed buildings in Dundee/2 =

This is a list of listed buildings in Dundee, Scotland.

== List ==
Name	Location	Date Listed	Grid Ref. (Note: Sometimes known as OSGB36, the grid reference (where provided) is based on the British national grid reference system used by the Ordnance Survey. • "Guide to National Grid". Ordnance Survey. • "Get-a-map". Ordnance Survey.)	Geo-coordinates	Notes	LB Number (Note: Historic Environment Scotland assign a unique alphanumeric identifier to each designated site in Scotland, for listed buildings this always begins with "LB", for example "LB12345".)	Image
353 Kingsway				56°29′03″N 2°59′13″W	Category B	49863	Upload Photo
West Ferry, 69 Dundee Road, The Lodge, Including Wall And Gatepiers				56°28′07″N 2°54′19″W	Category B	25923	Upload Photo
West Ferry, 62 Dundee Road, St Roque's Cottages				56°28′09″N 2°53′18″W	Category C(S)	25930	Upload Photo
Broughty Ferry, Monifieth Road, Jubilee Arch And Fountain, Including Gatepiers At Left And Right				56°28′13″N 2°51′20″W	Category C(S)	25858	Upload another image See more images
Broughty Ferry, 96 Monifieth Road, Seabourne Lodge, Including Gatepiers				56°28′12″N 2°51′17″W	Category C(S)	25862	Upload Photo
Broughty Ferry, Queen Street, Public Library				56°28′06″N 2°52′25″W	Category C(S)	25869	Upload Photo
Broughty Ferry, 59-63 (Odd Nos) Reres Road, Airlie Lodge, Including Gatepiers And Boundary Walls				56°28′21″N 2°51′18″W	Category C(S)	25875	Upload Photo
Linlathen, East Bridge Over Dichty Water				56°29′05″N 2°52′19″W	Category A	25892	Upload another image
Stannergate, 306-308 Broughty Ferry Road, Including Boundary Wall				56°28′08″N 2°55′29″W	Category C(S)	25899	Upload Photo
West Ferry, 30 Albany Road, Balnacraig				56°28′11″N 2°54′08″W	Category B	25904	Upload Photo
West Ferry, Craigiebarn Road, Netherton Of Craigie Including Garden Wall				56°28′18″N 2°54′56″W	Category B	25916	Upload Photo
West Ferry, Craigiebarn Road, Craigiebarn, Including Garden Walls				56°28′18″N 2°54′52″W	Category B	25917	Upload Photo
West Ferry, 23 Douglas Terrace				56°28′08″N 2°53′17″W	Category B	25920	Upload Photo
Broughty Ferry, 150, 152 And 154 Brook Street, Masonic Hall				56°28′02″N 2°52′36″W	Category B	25772	Upload Photo
Broughty Ferry, Camperdown Street, Grove Academy, Including Boundary Walls And Railings				56°28′12″N 2°52′49″W	Category B	25774	Upload Photo
Broughty Ferry, 37 And 37A Camperdown Street, Cambus Lodge Including Gatepiers And Boundary Walls				56°28′11″N 2°52′33″W	Category C(S)	25777	Upload Photo
Broughty Ferry, 42 Camphill Road, Craig-Gowan, Including Walls And Gatepiers				56°28′09″N 2°52′03″W	Category B	25782	Upload another image
Broughty Ferry, 44, 46 And 48 Camphill Road, Rowanbank, Including Wall, Gatepiers, Stable And Coach House				56°28′10″N 2°52′00″W	Category B	25783	Upload Photo
Broughty Ferry, 1-13 (Inclusive) Castle Terrace, Including Wall And Gatepiers, And Wall At Castle Street				56°27′54″N 2°51′56″W	Category C(S)	25788	Upload Photo
Broughty Ferry, Chapel Lane, Off Fisher Street, Old Burial Ground				56°27′57″N 2°52′47″W	Category B	25789	Upload Photo
Broughty Ferry, 8-18 Gray Street, Ferry House				56°27′55″N 2°52′26″W	Category B	25825	Upload Photo
Broughty Ferry, The Harbour				56°27′50″N 2°52′19″W	Category B	25828	Upload another image See more images
Broughty Ferry, 6 Hermitage Road, The Hermitage Including Walls And Gatepiers				56°28′06″N 2°52′12″W	Category B	25832	Upload Photo
Broughty Ferry, 1A Hill Street				56°28′11″N 2°52′28″W	Category C(S)	25834	Upload Photo
Broughty Ferry, 21 Hill Street, Dunalistair Gardens, Vc House, Including Retaining Wall				56°28′14″N 2°52′14″W	Category B	25837	Upload Photo
Broughty Ferry, Hill Street, Lodge To Birchwood Roy (Formerly To Castleroy)				56°28′14″N 2°52′11″W	Category B	25838	Upload Photo
Broughty Ferry, 2 Hill Street, Including Boundary Wall, Gatepiers And Gateway				56°28′11″N 2°52′29″W	Category C(S)	25839	Upload Photo
Broughty Ferry, 8, 8A And 10 Hill Street, Herschel House				56°28′09″N 2°52′22″W	Category C(S)	25841	Upload Photo
42-6 Wilkie's Lane, St Joseph's Roman Catholic Church And Presbytery, "Mount St Joseph"				56°27′36″N 2°59′17″W	Category B	25686	Upload Photo
Barnhill 11 Panmure Terrace, The Gorse, Including Former Coach House And Stable, Boundary Walls And Gatepiers				56°28′24″N 2°51′09″W	Category C(S)	25746	Upload Photo
Broughty Ferry, 19 Beach Crescent, Traquair				56°27′55″N 2°52′24″W	Category B	25760	Upload Photo
Broughty Ferry, 99 Beach Crescent And 1-5 (Odd Nos) St Vincent Street, The Red House				56°27′52″N 2°52′17″W	Category B	25763	Upload Photo
21-29 (Odd Nos) Union Street				56°27′32″N 2°58′16″W	Category B	25580	Upload Photo
31-47 Union Street, 25 Yeaman Shore				56°27′32″N 2°58′15″W	Category B	25582	Upload Photo
10-16 (Even Nos) Perth Road				56°27′24″N 2°58′44″W	Category C(S)	25583	Upload Photo
416, 418 Perth Road, Including Railings				56°27′23″N 3°00′05″W	Category C(S)	25609	Upload Photo
428 Perth Road, Including Railings				56°27′23″N 3°00′07″W	Category C(S)	25613	Upload Photo
1A West Bell Street, 18 Constitution Road, Regional Music Centre, Including Gatepiers And Railings, Formerly Bell Street UP Church				56°27′45″N 2°58′30″W	Category B	25622	Upload Photo
474 Perth Road St Helens House, Lodge, Gatepiers And Boundary Walls				56°27′20″N 3°00′46″W	Category B	25628	Upload Photo
484 Perth Road, Taypark With Boundary Walls				56°27′21″N 3°00′54″W	Category B	25630	Upload Photo
10-22 (Even Nos) Whitehall Crescent				56°27′33″N 2°58′10″W	Category B	25649	Upload Photo
3, 5, 7, Rockfield Street And 48, 50, 52 Shaftesbury Road Including Garden Walls And Gatepiers				56°27′25″N 3°00′14″W	Category B	25650	Upload Photo
26-36 (Even Nos) Whitehall Street				56°27′34″N 2°58′12″W	Category B	25669	Upload Photo
2-14 (Even Nos) Reform Street, 49, 50, 51 High Street				56°27′39″N 2°58′14″W	Category B	25525	Upload Photo
38 And 40 Reform Street, 1 And 3 Bank Street				56°27′41″N 2°58′18″W	Category B	25533	Upload Photo
60-64 (Even Nos) Reform Street, Meadow House				56°27′43″N 2°58′20″W	Category B	25538	Upload Photo
239-257 (Odd Nos) Perth Road, Windsor Terrace, Including Boundary Walls And Gatepiers				56°27′24″N 2°59′53″W	Category C(S)	25539	Upload Photo
33, 35 South Tay Street				56°27′31″N 2°58′35″W	Category B	25550	Upload Photo
307-313 (Odd Nos) Perth Road, 1 Grosvenor Road, 62-6 (Even Nos) Shaftesbury Road, Grosvenor Terrace Boundary Walls And Gatepiers				56°27′25″N 3°00′23″W	Category B	25557	Upload Photo
2, 4 South Tay Street, 115-121, (Odd Nos) Nethergate				56°27′27″N 2°58′32″W	Category B	25560	Upload Photo
43-65 (Odd Nos) Trades Lane				56°27′44″N 2°57′54″W	Category B	25574	Upload Photo
7 Guthrie Street, Railwaymen's Social Club, Former Ward Foundry Office				56°27′40″N 2°58′49″W	Category C(S)	25427	Upload Photo
37, 39 Hyndford Street With Boundary Wall				56°27′34″N 3°00′05″W	Category C(S)	25445	Upload Photo
2 Panmure Terrace, With Boundary Walls				56°28′01″N 2°58′55″W	Category B	25446	Upload Photo
Harrison Road, Timex Factory				56°29′04″N 3°01′19″W	Category B	25448	Upload Photo
3 Panmure Terrace Druimbeg, With Boundary Walls				56°28′01″N 2°58′57″W	Category B	25450	Upload Photo
Pitalpin Street,335 South Road, Lochee, Pitalpin House				56°28′29″N 3°01′31″W	Category B	25460	Upload Photo
2 Magdalen Place				56°27′14″N 2°59′14″W	Category C(S)	25462	Upload Photo
105 Magdalen Yard Road, And 1A Osbourne Place, Osbourne Villa And Raewood Villa With Boundary Walls				56°27′14″N 2°59′44″W	Category B	25496	Upload Photo
1-9 (Odd Nos) Milnbank Road And 2-12 (Even Nos) Polepark Road				56°27′44″N 2°59′27″W	Category C(S)	25502	Upload Photo
2 Union Terrace, And Returns To Constitution Road And Constitution Terrace, Terrace House, With Boundary Walls And Gatepiers				56°27′58″N 2°58′41″W	Category B	25506	Upload Photo
Meadowside And Barrack Street, The Howff				56°27′42″N 2°58′22″W	Category A	25312	Upload another image
57 Forfar Road				56°28′47″N 2°57′07″W	Category C(S)	25315	Upload Photo
Gardner Street, Lawside Convent Of Mercy, Or St Joseph's Convent, Including Chapel, And Boundary Walls				56°28′04″N 2°59′46″W	Category B	25319	Upload Photo
Harefield Road, Florence Booth House, Formerly Clement Park, Including Stable Wall And Garden Balustrade				56°28′35″N 3°00′31″W	Category B	25330	Upload Photo
4 Meadowside, Head Post Office				56°27′44″N 2°58′25″W	Category B	25336	Upload another image
55 High Street Lochee, Tsb Former Dundee Savings Bank				56°28′16″N 3°00′32″W	Category B	25349	Upload Photo
9, 11 Laurel Bank, Including Gatepiers And Boundary Walls				56°27′55″N 2°58′32″W	Category C(S)	25389	Upload Photo
2, 4 Laurel Bank, With Boundary Walls, Railings And Gatepiers				56°27′54″N 2°58′38″W	Category B	25393	Upload Photo
10 Laurel Bank, And Return To Prospect Place, With Boundary Walls, And Gatepiers				56°27′56″N 2°58′35″W	Category C(S)	25401	Upload Photo
12 Laurel Bank, And Return To Prospect Place, With Boundary Walls And Gatepiers				56°27′56″N 2°58′34″W	Category B	25405	Upload Photo
141, 143 Nethergate				56°27′26″N 2°58′35″W	Category B	25406	Upload Photo
143C Nethergate				56°27′27″N 2°58′36″W	Category B	25410	Upload Photo
1 High Street				56°27′40″N 2°58′07″W	Category C(S)	25215	Upload Photo
Crescent Street, Wallacetown Parish Church (Now Also Trinity Church, Church Of Scotland)				56°28′03″N 2°57′36″W	Category B	25216	Upload Photo
1 Dudhope Terrace				56°28′00″N 2°58′52″W	Category B	25226	Upload Photo
3 Dudhope Terrace				56°28′00″N 2°58′55″W	Category B	25233	Upload Photo
70-73 (Inclusive Nos) High Street, Including Gardyne's Land, Gray's Close And Clock With Model Of The Town House				56°27′40″N 2°58′11″W	Category A	25239	Upload another image
1-10 (Inclusive Nos) City Square And 5-8 (Inclusive Nos) High Street, East Wing Of City Square				56°27′38″N 2°58′09″W	Category C(S)	25255	Upload Photo
234-238 (Even Nos) Hilltown, 4, 6 Stirling Street				56°28′09″N 2°58′30″W	Category B	25260	Upload Photo
14-22 (Inclusive Nos) City Square, 22-24 (Inclusive Nos) High Street And 2-18 (Even Nos) Crichton Street, West Wing Of City Square				56°27′37″N 2°58′12″W	Category B	25262	Upload another image See more images
5-19 (Odd Nos) King Street And 28, 30, 32 Cowgate				56°27′52″N 2°58′01″W	Category B	25271	Upload Photo
1-31 (Odd Nos) Lyon Street, And 30 Albert Street				56°28′07″N 2°57′33″W	Category B	25287	Upload Photo
1 And 3 Perth Road, Ellenbank And Union Mount, University Of Dundee, Including Gatepiers And Boundary Wall				56°27′26″N 2°58′48″W	Category B	25289	Upload another image
60 Small's Wynd, Old Technical Institute, Including Former College Hall, Boundary Wall And Gatepiers				56°27′27″N 2°58′44″W	Category B	25308	Upload Photo
Taylor's Lane, Seafield Works (West Side Of Taylor's Lane Only)				56°27′19″N 2°59′39″W	Category A	25111	Upload Photo
11-19 (Odd Nos) Cowgate, Caxton House				56°27′49″N 2°58′05″W	Category C(S)	25120	Upload Photo
11, 13 Crichton Street				56°27′35″N 2°58′13″W	Category B	25128	Upload Photo
2 Wallace Street, Blackscroft And Constable Street, Wallace Craigie Works Offices				56°27′58″N 2°57′29″W	Category B	25136	Upload Photo
2 Clive Street With Boundary Walls				56°28′37″N 2°57′23″W	Category B	25149	Upload Photo
16-19 (Inclusive Nos) Dock Street/3-9 (Odd Nos) Exchange Street/15 Shore Terrace, Former Exchange Coffee House				56°27′37″N 2°58′03″W	Category A	25150	Upload another image
56 West Henderson's Wynd, Former Meadow Or North Dudhope Mill				56°27′44″N 2°59′04″W	Category B	25152	Upload Photo
2, 4 Constitution Terrace And 82, Constitution Street Including Boundary Walls And Gatepiers				56°28′00″N 2°58′43″W	Category B	25161	Upload Photo
3 Coupar Angus Road Lochee West Church Manse				56°28′29″N 3°00′45″W	Category C(S)	25176	Upload Photo
Blacks Croft And Foundry Lane, "Ricks", Former St Roques Public Library, Including Railings, Balusters And Garden Walls				56°27′54″N 2°57′42″W	Category B	25191	Upload Photo
2 Euclid Street, High School Preparatory Department				56°27′45″N 2°58′28″W	Category B	25193	Upload Photo
2, 4 Candle Lane And 99 Seagate And 25-37 (Odd Nos) Trades Lane, Watson's Bond, Hm Customs Warehouse No 4 (Excluding 1 And 2-Storey Building)				56°27′45″N 2°58′01″W	Category A	25194	Upload Photo
26 Castle Street, Castle Chambers				56°27′38″N 2°58′05″W	Category B	25028	Upload Photo
West Marketgait, 2 Guthrie Street And 30 East Henderson's Wynd, Former Tay Works Calender				56°27′40″N 2°58′43″W	Category B	25037	Upload Photo
42-48 (Even Nos) Castle Street/2-8 (Even Nos) Exchange Street				56°27′38″N 2°58′03″W	Category B	25039	Upload Photo
Castle Street And Shore Terrace, North West Corner, Lampstandard				56°27′37″N 2°58′04″W	Category C(S)	25043	Upload Photo
82-86 (Even Nos) Broughty Ferry Road				56°28′00″N 2°57′09″W	Category B	25045	Upload Photo
19, 21 Commercial Street				56°27′40″N 2°58′00″W	Category C(S)	25055	Upload Photo
Caird Park, Mains Farm, Former Granary And Horse Mill Only				56°29′03″N 2°57′34″W	Category C(S)	25074	Upload Photo
34 Commercial Street Former Flour Mill				56°27′39″N 2°58′03″W	Category B	25091	Upload Photo
Clatto Reservoir, With Sluice House, Entrance Railings And Gatepiers				56°29′57″N 3°01′39″W	Category B	25106	Upload Photo
Clatto Reservoir, Waterworks Cottage				56°29′53″N 3°01′27″W	Category B	25109	Upload Photo
64, 66 Barrack Street And Return Elevation To South Ward Road, Friarfield House				56°27′41″N 2°58′26″W	Category B	24941	Upload Photo
Marine Parade, Harbour Workshops And Patent Slip				56°27′36″N 2°57′38″W	Category A	24957	Upload Photo
Telford Light, Dundee Waterfront Near Tay Bridge				56°27′32″N 2°57′55″W	Category B	24966	Upload Photo
7, 9, 11 Bell Street, Baltic Chambers				56°27′48″N 2°58′20″W	Category C(S)	24973	Upload Photo
Barrack Rd Dundee Royal Infirmary, Original Block Out Patients Dept & Urology Theatre				56°27′55″N 2°58′51″W	Category A	24982	Upload Photo
Constable Street And Return Elevation To Dens Street (E Side)				56°27′56″N 2°57′43″W	Category B	24985	Upload Photo
17, 18 Baxter Park Terrace, 35 Park Avenue				56°28′17″N 2°57′11″W	Category B	25004	Upload Photo
8 Bingham Terrace The Anchorage				56°28′24″N 2°56′45″W	Category B	25012	Upload Photo
36, 38 Bingham Terrace				56°28′26″N 2°56′31″W	Category C(S)	25023	Upload Photo
1 Albany Terrace, With Boundary Walls And Gatepiers				56°28′03″N 2°58′56″W	Category B	24924	Upload Photo
Albert Square, Statue Of Robert Burns				56°27′44″N 2°58′19″W	Category B	24925	Upload Photo
28 Annfield Road, Baltic Works, Chimney And Former Mill				56°27′29″N 2°59′31″W	Category B	24927	Upload another image
West Ferry, 22 Douglas Terrace				56°28′08″N 2°53′15″W	Category C(S)	25922	Upload Photo
West Ferry, 4 Duntrune Terrace, Melford Including Enclosing Wall And Gatepiers				56°28′24″N 2°53′18″W	Category C(S)	25933	Upload Photo
West Ferry, 92 And 94 Grove Road				56°28′27″N 2°53′26″W	Category C(S)	25945	Upload Photo
Broughty Ferry, 357 King Street, Links House, With Gatepiers And Boundary Walls At S, E And W				56°27′55″N 2°52′13″W	Category B	25846	Upload Photo
Broughty Ferry, 37 Monifieth Road, Kazarami, Including Boundary Wall				56°28′05″N 2°52′00″W	Category B	25851	Upload Photo
Broughty Ferry, 47 And 49 Monifieth Road, Including Wall And Gatepiers				56°28′06″N 2°51′56″W	Category C(S)	25852	Upload Photo
Broughty Ferry, 51 And 53 Monifieth Road, Including Garage, Walls And Gatepiers				56°28′06″N 2°51′54″W	Category C(S)	25853	Upload Photo
Broughty Ferry, 71 Monifieth Road, Reres Lodge, Including Gatepiers And Boundary Wall				56°28′07″N 2°51′46″W	Category C(S)	25855	Upload Photo
Broughty Ferry, Queen Street, Guliston House, Former Queen Street Church, Including Wall And Railings				56°28′06″N 2°52′28″W	Category B	25873	Upload Photo
Broughty Ferry, 41 Reres Road, Former Stable Court To Rocknowe House				56°28′17″N 2°51′35″W	Category C(S)	25874	Upload Photo
Broughty Ferry, 30 Seafield Road, The Pines, Including Gatepiers, Boundary Wall And Lampstandard				56°27′31″N 2°58′15″W	Category C(S)	25882	Upload Photo
Broughty Ferry, 2 Whinnybrae, Eastern Primary School, Including Wall And Entrance Gates, And Playsheds And Lavatories At Rear				56°28′05″N 2°52′06″W	Category A	25887	Upload another image
Lammerton, Road Bridge Over Murroes Burn				56°29′25″N 2°53′12″W	Category B	25890	Upload Photo
Linlathen, West Bridge Over Dichty Water				56°29′00″N 2°52′40″W	Category A	25893	Upload Photo
Stannergate, 310 Broughty Ferry Road, Ingleside, Including Gatepiers And Boundary Walls				56°28′08″N 2°55′27″W	Category B	25900	Upload Photo
West Ferry, 3 Albert Road, Broomfield Nurseries, Including Conservatory, Formerly Broomhall				56°28′16″N 2°53′07″W	Category B	25907	Upload Photo
West Ferry, 4 And 6 Bayfield Road And 16 Albert Road, Lynfield, Including Gatepiers And Wall				56°28′12″N 2°53′04″W	Category B	25910	Upload Photo
West Ferry, Beach Lane, Railway Footbridge				56°28′07″N 2°53′31″W	Category B	25911	Upload Photo
West Ferry, Claypotts Road, Claypotts Castle				56°28′35″N 2°53′24″W	Category A	25913	Upload another image
Broughty Ferry, 1, 3 And 5 Camphill Road, Enclosing Wall And Gatepiers Only				56°28′07″N 2°52′29″W	Category C(S)	25778	Upload Photo
Broughty Ferry, 115 Fisher Street, Barometer Cottage				56°27′54″N 2°52′37″W	Category B	25800	Upload another image
Broughty Ferry, Fisher Street, Lifeboat House, Including Slipway				56°27′54″N 2°52′38″W	Category B	25805	Upload another image
Broughty Ferry, 20 Gray Street				56°27′55″N 2°52′25″W	Category B	25826	Upload Photo
Broughty Ferry, 22 Gray Street				56°27′56″N 2°52′25″W	Category B	25827	Upload Photo
1-6 (Inclusive Nos) Windsor Place				56°27′15″N 2°59′49″W	Category B	25687	Upload Photo
Baldovie, Baldovie Toll House				56°29′20″N 2°53′33″W	Category B	25735	Upload Photo
Balmossie, Panmure Bleachfield, Cottages And Stable Block				56°28′56″N 2°50′40″W	Category B	25740	Upload Photo
Balmossie, Panmure Bleachfield, House/Tenement				56°28′58″N 2°50′54″W	Category B	25741	Upload Photo
Barnhill, Invermark Terrace, Barnhill St Margaret's Church				56°28′25″N 2°50′52″W	Category B	25743	Upload Photo
Barnhill, 6 And 8 Panmure Terrace, Ferncroft, Including Garage, Gatepiers And Gates				56°28′23″N 2°51′08″W	Category B	25749	Upload Photo
Barnhill, 27 Strathmore Street, Barnhill Cemetery Lodge				56°28′29″N 2°51′25″W	Category C(S)	25750	Upload Photo

== Key ==
The scheme for classifying buildings in Scotland is:

- Category A: "buildings of national or international importance, either architectural or historic; or fine, little-altered examples of some particular period, style or building type."
- Category B: "buildings of regional or more than local importance; or major examples of some particular period, style or building type, which may have been altered."
- Category C: "buildings of local importance; lesser examples of any period, style, or building type, as originally constructed or moderately altered; and simple traditional buildings which group well with other listed buildings."

In March 2016 there were 47,288 listed buildings in Scotland. Of these, 8% were Category A, and 50% were Category B, with the remaining 42% being Category C.

== See also ==
- List of listed buildings in Dundee
