= James Thomson (architect, born 1852) =

City Architect of Dundee, Scotland

James Thomson (1852–1927) was the City Engineer, City Architect, and Housing Director of Dundee, Scotland. He originally planned an immense Beaux Arts style Civic Centre covering the centre of Dundee. At the onset of First World War, his plans were scaled down and he retired in 1924.

Thomson was the designer behind the "Kingsway" City Bypass, combined road widening and slum clearance, the Craigie Garden City Estate and the first ever district heated housing scheme at Logie. After Thomson's death in 1927 his former assistant, James MacLellan Brown, as Deputy City Architect, remodelled Burnet's designs in 1931.

== Early life ==
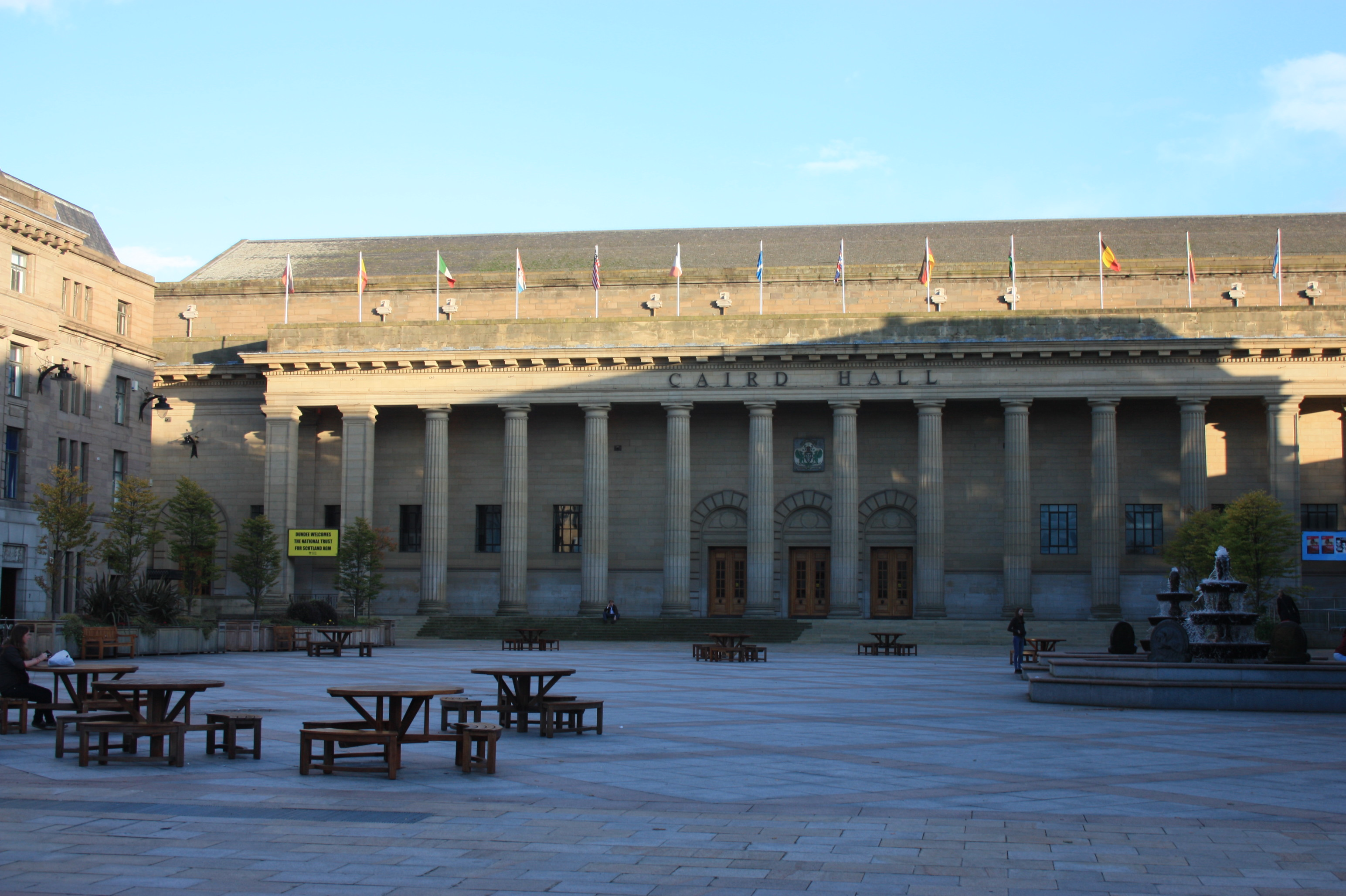
Thomson's magnum opus - Caird Hall and Caird Hall Square, Dundee

A native of Edinburgh, he was born to Alexander Thomson and Mary Higgins on 9 April 1851. He received professional training in Architecture and Civil Engineering. As a young man, he came to Dundee to join the staff of the Burgh Surveyor. Soon after taking the duty he was employed in connection with major schemes then being executed under the Improvement Act of 1871. Those undertakings, which, to a large extent, transformed the central area of the city, were carried under his personal supervision. The construction of the Perth Road and the first tramway lines in Dundee were accomplished under his direction.

== Career ==
Thomson became the Assistant Burgh Engineer after the constructions of Perth Road and tramlines. After the death of William Alexander in 1904, he was appointed as City Architect, and in August 1906, he was given the post of City Engineer in succession to Mackison, becoming, in pursuance of the council's Policy of Consolidation, the joint holder of the offices of City Architect and Engineer.

In October 1922, the Town Council decided to separate the offices of City Engineering and City Architect, which the latter office embraced the duties of Housing Director. Thomson was relieved of the office of City Engineer and became City Architect and Housing Director.

Thomson retired in May 1924, but was retained in the capacity and continued to engage in professional life in association with his son Frank Thomson. He spent 55 years in the service of the corporation. His fondest hope and expressed desire was to have the Caird Hall Square completed "in his time".

== Visionary ==
The media referred to Thomson as the "creator of innumerable schemes to make Dundee the City Beautiful." Thomson's report on the development of the city issued in 1918 was an example of his visions and daring conceptions. He was the man behind the construction of Kingsway City Bypass, combined road widening and slum clearance, which was proposed, "…so that the city might expand advantageously and scientifically and get away from the old fashioned methods." He planned the Craigie Garden City Estate and the first ever district heated housing scheme at Logie.Thomson's ideas for extending City Square were developed again in 1924, when the Ecole de Beaux Arts trained Sir John James Burnet was commissioned to produce designs for the east and west wings to City Square.

James Thomson's work enjoyed an international reputation and he was the first engineer of a Scottish municipality to be elected as the President of the Institution of Municipal and County Engineers.

== Death ==
On 10 November 1927, in one of the corridors of Caird Hall, Thomson collapsed and died. A woman who had been waiting to see the Lord Provost saw him fall in the main corridor. She informed Lord Provost High and S. G. Fraser, with whom he was engaged at the moment, and they ran to his assistance. Thomson made a vain effort to speak but died in the arms of Fraser. Dr. Hunter, who was called, certified that the death to have been due to heart failure. At the time of death he was engaged on some of the minor details relating to the scheme for the erection of the East Wing. His funeral took palace in Balgay Cemetery on 14 November 1927.

== Archives ==
A collection of papers relating to James Thomson is held by the archives at the University of Dundee.

== Sources ==
- McKean, Charles and David Walker, Dundee: Illustrated Architectural Guide, Royal Incorporation of Architects in Scotland, Pillans & Wilson Ltd., Reprint 1993.
- Dundee public Library Archives.
- The Courier, Pioneer in Town Planning Mr. James Thomson Dies in Caird hall, Friday 11 Nov. 1927
- The Courier, Funeral of Mr. James Thomson, Nove. 15, 1927
