= List of listed buildings in Dundee/5 =

This is a list of listed buildings in Dundee, Scotland.

== List ==
Name	Location	Date listed	Grid ref. (Note: Sometimes known as OSGB36, the grid reference (where provided) is based on the British national grid reference system used by the Ordnance Survey. • "Guide to National Grid". Ordnance Survey. • "Get-a-map". Ordnance Survey.)	Geo-coordinates	Notes	LB number (Note: Historic Environment Scotland assign a unique alphanumeric identifier to each designated site in Scotland, for listed buildings this always begins with "LB", for example "LB12345".)	Image
Broughty Ferry, 218 Queen Street, Post Office				56°28′05″N 2°52′33″W	Category C(S)	25871	Upload Photo
Broughty Ferry, Queen Street, East Church				56°28′03″N 2°52′14″W	Category B	25872	Upload Photo
Broughty Ferry, 158 St Vincent Street				56°28′00″N 2°52′11″W	Category C(S)	25877	Upload Photo
Broughty Ferry, St Vincent Street, Baptist Church				56°27′56″N 2°52′12″W	Category C(S)	25879	Upload Photo
West Ferry, Craigiebarn Road, Stirling House, Including Wall In Garden				56°28′16″N 2°54′58″W	Category B	25918	Upload Photo
Broughty Ferry, 151 Brook Street, Ymca Gymnasium				56°28′04″N 2°52′38″W	Category C(S)	25767	Upload Photo
Broughty Ferry, 134 Brook Street, Former Municipal Buildings, Including Wrought-Iron Arch And Clock				56°28′03″N 2°52′39″W	Category C(S)	25771	Upload Photo
Broughty Ferry, 79-85 (Odd Nos) Fisher Street				56°27′55″N 2°52′41″W	Category C(S)	25796	Upload Photo
Broughty Ferry, 87 Fisher Street				56°27′55″N 2°52′40″W	Category C(S)	25797	Upload Photo
Broughty Ferry, 89 Fisher Street				56°27′55″N 2°52′40″W	Category C(S)	25798	Upload Photo
Broughty Ferry, 161 Fisher Street				56°27′54″N 2°52′32″W	Category C(S)	25801	Upload Photo
Broughty Ferry, 16 Fort Street				56°27′56″N 2°52′37″W	Category C(S)	25813	Upload Photo
Broughty Ferry, 48 Fort Street				56°27′58″N 2°52′35″W	Category C(S)	25815	Upload Photo
Broughty Ferry, 21 Hill Street, Dunalistair Gardens, Dunalistair, Including Detached Former Service Wing,_Retaining Wall And Balustrade				56°28′14″N 2°52′16″W	Category B	25836	Upload Photo
49 Seafield Road And 6 Magdalen Place, Elm Lodge With Boundary Walls				56°27′16″N 2°59′14″W	Category B	25677	Upload Photo
Tullideph Road, St Francis Friary (Rc)				56°27′57″N 2°59′55″W	Category B	25682	Upload Photo
53-61 (Odd Nos) West Port And 3, 5, Johnston's Lane				56°27′34″N 2°58′47″W	Category B	25685	Upload Photo
Baldovie, Baldovie House, Including Boundary Wall				56°29′16″N 2°53′42″W	Category C(S)	25734	Upload Photo
Barnhill 5 Montagu Street (Formerly The Shieling)				56°28′32″N 2°50′54″W	Category C(S)	25745	Upload Photo
By 40 Perth Road, Seabraes Gentlemen's Lavatories				56°27′24″N 2°58′47″W	Category B	25589	Upload Photo
158 Perth Road, St Mark's Church (Gate Fellowship)				56°27′22″N 2°59′08″W	Category A	25601	Upload another image
412 Perth Road, The Binns				56°27′22″N 3°00′04″W	Category B	25605	Upload Photo
4 Ward Road, Auction Rooms				56°27′41″N 2°58′28″W	Category C(S)	25612	Upload Photo
452 Perth Road, Greywalls				56°27′20″N 3°00′19″W	Category A	25617	Upload Photo
506 Perth Road West Dene, With Boundary Walls And Gatepiers				56°27′23″N 3°01′11″W	Category B	25634	Upload Photo
24 Whitehall Crescent, 9, 10 Dock Street, Gilfillan Memorial Church				56°27′33″N 2°58′11″W	Category B	25651	Upload Photo
17, 17A Roseangle And 10 Greenfield Place With Boundary Walls				56°27′20″N 2°59′01″W	Category B	25654	Upload Photo
9-13 Whitehall Street, Whitehall Chambers				56°27′33″N 2°58′13″W	Category B	25661	Upload Photo
225 Perth Road And Blackness Avenue, Blackness Branch Library, With Railings				56°27′25″N 2°59′46″W	Category B	25532	Upload Photo
231-233 Perth Road, Blackness Crescent With Boundary Walls				56°27′25″N 2°59′50″W	Category C(S)	25536	Upload Photo
Riverside Drive, Discovery Quay, Alexandra Fountain				56°27′22″N 2°58′09″W	Category B	25541	Upload Photo
315 Perth Road, Western Cemetery Entrance Screen, Boundary Walls, Monuments And Lodges, 2 And 4 Grosvenor Road				56°27′24″N 3°00′28″W	Category B	25559	Upload Photo
325 Perth Road University, Formerly Elmslea, House And Lodge, Boundary Walls And Gatepiers				56°27′24″N 3°00′40″W	Category B	25563	Upload Photo
333 Perth Road Including Boundary Walls And E Gatepiers, Formerly To Farington Hall				56°27′25″N 3°00′54″W	Category C(S)	25569	Upload Photo
86 Nethergate, St David's Halls, (In Close To Rear Of 84, 88 And 90 Nethergate)				56°27′31″N 2°58′19″W	Category B	25429	Upload Photo
Hazel Avenue Or 385 Perth Road, Wayside				56°27′32″N 3°01′45″W	Category C(S)	25439	Upload Photo
1 Panmure Terrace, With Boundary Walls And Gatepiers				56°28′01″N 2°58′54″W	Category B	25443	Upload Photo
6 Paradise Road, Marrbank, And 7, 9 Dudhope Street, With Boundary Walls And Gatepiers				56°27′53″N 2°58′31″W	Category B	25457	Upload Photo
172 Nethergate, Spring Grove, (Formerly Caird Rest), Including Balustraded Steps And Boundary Walls				56°27′24″N 2°58′40″W	Category B	25477	Upload Photo
59 Magdalen Yard Road, Royal Dundee Institution For The Blind, (Building Fronting Magdalen Yard Road Only) With Boundary Walls And Gatepiers				56°27′12″N 2°59′27″W	Category C(S)	25478	Upload Photo
43, 45 North Lindsay Street				56°27′40″N 2°58′33″W	Category B	25483	Upload Photo
26-36 (Even Nos) North Lindsay Street				56°27′36″N 2°58′29″W	Category B	25486	Upload Photo
Magdalen Yard Road, 91, 93, Seafield Lodge				56°27′14″N 2°59′39″W	Category B	25493	Upload Photo
10 Milnbank Road With Railings				56°27′43″N 2°59′26″W	Category B	25505	Upload Photo
48, 50 St Andrews Street Or Lane, And Cowgate, Former Dundee Calender And Villa: "The Sea Captain's House"				56°27′50″N 2°57′59″W	Category B	25310	Upload Photo
81 Seagate And Return Elevation To Candle Lane Former No 2 Customs Warehouse				56°27′44″N 2°58′00″W	Category B	25318	Upload Photo
9 Wellington Street, Walker House				56°28′03″N 2°57′57″W	Category C(S)	25337	Upload Photo
22 Meadowside, 2 Courier Place, Euclid Crescent, Courier Building				56°27′44″N 2°58′22″W	Category B	25339	Upload another image
191 High Street, Lochee, Lochee West Church (Church Of Scotland)				56°28′28″N 3°00′45″W	Category B	25357	Upload Photo
Balgay Park Pavilion				56°27′50″N 3°00′49″W	Category B	25360	Upload Photo
191 High Street, And Nicholl's Lane, Lochee, Lochee West Church Hall				56°28′27″N 3°00′43″W	Category C(S)	25361	Upload Photo
High Street, Lochee And Old Muirton Road Former Lochee Station, Now Lochee Burns Club				56°28′11″N 3°00′22″W	Category B	25365	Upload another image
Nethergate, City Churches, St Mary's Tower, Or The Steeple				56°27′34″N 2°58′23″W	Category A	25370	Upload Photo
Nethergate, Mercat Cross				56°27′32″N 2°58′23″W	Category B	25386	Upload Photo
432 Blackness Road, Redcroft With Boundary Walls And Gatepiers (Excluding Lodges)				56°27′32″N 3°01′10″W	Category B	25392	Upload Photo
Law Hill War Memorial				56°28′11″N 2°59′22″W	Category B	25409	Upload another image
24 Exchange Street				56°27′39″N 2°58′01″W	Category B	25211	Upload Photo
Dens Road Primary School Including Air Intake For Plenum Heating, System, Janitors House And Railings				56°28′23″N 2°58′13″W	Category B	25225	Upload Photo
26, 28 High Street				56°27′36″N 2°58′14″W	Category B	25227	Upload Photo
2 Dudhope Terrace				56°28′00″N 2°58′54″W	Category B	25229	Upload Photo
10 Dudhope Terrace				56°27′58″N 2°59′06″W	Category B	25257	Upload Photo
240 Hilltown And 1A Stirling Street. Former Dundee Savings Bank				56°28′10″N 2°58′31″W	Category B	25264	Upload Photo
Off Perth Road, Geddes Quadrangle, East Wing, (Also Known As East Wing Of Harris Building), University Of Dundee				56°27′27″N 2°58′48″W	Category B	25277	Upload Photo
22 Powrie Place And Forebank Road, St Mary's Rc Presbytery				56°28′01″N 2°58′15″W	Category B	25298	Upload Photo
Thistle Street, Bowbridge Works, Gates And Gatepiers				56°28′19″N 2°58′28″W	Category C(S)	25118	Upload Photo
Victoria Street, Former Eagle Jute Mills (Victoria Street Front Only)				56°28′04″N 2°57′44″W	Category B	25129	Upload Photo
21 Crichton Street				56°27′35″N 2°58′12″W	Category C(S)	25134	Upload Photo
27 West Henderson's Wynd And Return Elevation To Milne Street, Verdant Works				56°27′42″N 2°58′58″W	Category A	25140	Upload another image See more images
2 West Henderson's Wynd, Former South Anchor Mill Weaving Factory				56°27′40″N 2°59′04″W	Category C(S)	25144	Upload Photo
45 Constitution Street And 1 Upper Constitution Street, Dungarth Gatepiers, Gates And Overthrow Arch				56°28′01″N 2°58′45″W	Category B	25153	Upload Photo
62, 63 Dock Street, 15 And 17 Candle Lane, Unicorn House, Former Sailors' Home And Chapel				56°27′42″N 2°57′53″W	Category B	25173	Upload Photo
4 Euclid Crescent, Trinity Hall, High School of Dundee, Formerly Original Secession Church				56°27′48″N 2°58′20″W	Category C(S)	25185	Upload Photo
Dudhope Castle				56°27′51″N 2°59′03″W	Category A	25195	Upload another image See more images
37, 39, 41 Cowgate				56°27′51″N 2°58′01″W	Category B	25205	Upload Photo
Broughty Ferry Road, Roodyards Burial Ground With Guthrie Mausoleum				56°28′01″N 2°56′45″W	Category B	25038	Upload Photo
Methven Street, Camperdown Works, Cox's Stack				56°28′22″N 3°00′12″W	Category A	25044	Upload another image See more images
2, 4 Commercial Street/37-40 (Inclusive Nos) Dock Street, Brough's Buildings				56°27′39″N 2°57′59″W	Category B	25079	Upload Photo
Camperdown Country Park, Stables And Former Tacksman's House				56°29′07″N 3°02′50″W	Category B	25086	Upload Photo
36-42 Commercial Street, St Roque's Hall, Including Boundary Wall, Archway And Steps To High Street				56°27′41″N 2°58′05″W	Category B	25095	Upload Photo
8 Constitution Road, Ward Congregational Church				56°27′43″N 2°58′30″W	Category B	25107	Upload Photo
Albert Square, Mcmanus Galleries, Formerly Albert Institute, Including Lampstandards				56°27′45″N 2°58′15″W	Category A	24939	Upload another image
Eastern Wharf, Princess Alexandra Wharf And Caledon West Wharf				56°27′50″N 2°56′37″W	Category B	24947	Upload Photo
7-25 (Odd Nos) Bank Street				56°27′41″N 2°58′19″W	Category B	24954	Upload Photo
Balmuir Bridge				56°29′43″N 2°58′34″W	Category B	24977	Upload Photo
31, 33 Castle Street				56°27′37″N 2°58′06″W	Category B	25013	Upload Photo
10 Castle Street				56°27′39″N 2°58′07″W	Category C(S)	25017	Upload Photo
32, 34 Bingham Terrace				56°28′25″N 2°56′32″W	Category C(S)	25019	Upload Photo
63-73 (Odd Nos) King Street				56°27′55″N 2°57′52″W	Category B	25022	Upload Photo
Albert Square, Statue Of James Carmichael				56°27′47″N 2°58′15″W	Category B	24930	Upload another image
West Ferry, 32 Dundee Road, Magdala, Including Wall And Gatepiers				56°28′10″N 2°53′32″W	Category B	25928	Upload Photo
West Ferry, 34 Dundee Road, Including Walls And Gatepiers, Fort William, Royal Tay Yacht Club				56°28′09″N 2°53′27″W	Category B	25929	Upload Photo
West Ferry, 17 Fairfield Road, Red Court Coach House And Stable				56°28′19″N 2°54′10″W	Category B	25940	Upload Photo
West Ferry, 6 Ralston Road, 1-6 (Inclusive Nos) Beachtower, Including Gatepiers And Boundary Walls				56°28′10″N 2°54′23″W	Category A	25947	Upload Photo
West Ferry, 118 Strathern Road, Northwood Lodge				56°28′22″N 2°53′18″W	Category C(S)	25949	Upload Photo
West Ferry, West Ferry Bay, Royal Tay Yacht Club, Beachclubhouse				56°28′07″N 2°53′38″W	Category B	25954	Upload Photo
Hawkhill, Blackness (Formerly Hawkhill) Primary School				56°27′24″N 2°59′30″W	Category B	25956	Upload Photo
Broughty Ferry, West Queen Street, St Luke's And Queen Street Church				56°28′10″N 2°53′00″W	Category A	25885	Upload another image See more images
Broughty Ferry, Yewbank Avenue, Roycroft, Including Glasshouse And Sundial				56°28′08″N 2°51′28″W	Category B	25888	Upload Photo
Pitkerro, Pitkerro House, Former Generator/Battery House				56°29′34″N 2°53′20″W	Category C(S)	25897	Upload Photo
Broughty Ferry, 397 Brook Street				56°28′00″N 2°52′10″W	Category C(S)	25770	Upload Photo
Broughty Ferry, 7 Camphill Road, Carbet Lodge, Including Gatepiers And Walls				56°28′08″N 2°52′21″W	Category B	25779	Upload Photo
Broughty Ferry 40 Camphill Road Woodknowe, Including Gatepiers And Boundary Walls				56°28′09″N 2°52′07″W	Category C(S)	25781	Upload Photo
Broughty Ferry, 74 Camphill Road, Former Bughties Lodge And Coach House				56°28′15″N 2°51′45″W	Category B	25785	Upload Photo
Broughty Ferry, Esplanade, Beach Shelter				56°28′03″N 2°51′30″W	Category C(S)	25793	Upload Photo
Broughty Ferry, 167 Fisher Street				56°27′54″N 2°52′32″W	Category C(S)	25802	Upload Photo
Broughty Ferry, 63 Fort Street, Wellwood				56°28′00″N 2°52′36″W	Category C(S)	25809	Upload Photo
Broughty Ferry, 14 Fort Street				56°27′55″N 2°52′37″W	Category C(S)	25812	Upload Photo
Broughty Ferry, The Harbour, Former Submarine Miners' Depot, Including Enclosing Wall				56°27′48″N 2°52′10″W	Category B	25830	Upload Photo
Broughty Ferry, 17 And 19 Hill Street, Forthill Cottage, Including Boundary Wall				56°28′12″N 2°52′19″W	Category B	25835	Upload Photo
Balmossie, Balmossie Railway Viaduct Over Dichty Water				56°28′54″N 2°50′35″W	Category A	25739	Upload Photo
Balmossie, Panmure Bleachfield, Road Bridge Over Dichty Water				56°28′53″N 2°50′44″W	Category C(S)	25742	Upload Photo
Barnhill, Invermark Terrace, St Margaret's Manse				56°28′24″N 2°50′56″W	Category C(S)	25744	Upload Photo
9-19 (Odd Nos) Union Street				56°27′33″N 2°58′17″W	Category B	25578	Upload Photo
12, 14, 16 Union Street				56°27′33″N 2°58′16″W	Category B	25586	Upload Photo
18, 20, 22 Union Street				56°27′33″N 2°58′15″W	Category B	25588	Upload Photo
150 Perth Road				56°27′22″N 2°59′01″W	Category B	25595	Upload Photo
71-87 (Odd Nos) Meadowside, Kandahar House				56°27′52″N 2°58′15″W	Category B	25598	Upload Photo
1-7 (Odd Nos) Ward Road, 1 And 2 Constitution Road				56°27′43″N 2°58′29″W	Category B	25600	Upload Photo
10, 12 Ward Road				56°27′41″N 2°58′31″W	Category B	25616	Upload Photo
458 Perth Road, The Ridges				56°27′23″N 3°00′23″W	Category B	25623	Upload Photo
11 Whitehall Crescent				56°27′34″N 2°58′11″W	Category B	25639	Upload Photo
13 And 15 Whitehall Crescent, 15 Whitehall Street				56°27′33″N 2°58′13″W	Category B	25641	Upload Photo
Dock Street, Former Custom House And Harbour Chambers				56°27′41″N 2°57′51″W	Category A	25673	Upload Photo
22 Paton's Lane With Boundary Walls				56°27′15″N 2°59′25″W	Category B	25520	Upload Photo
65-71 (Odd Nos) Reform Street Meadowside				56°27′43″N 2°58′18″W	Category B	25522	Upload another image See more images
165-7 Perth Road And 2 Ford's Lane, Including The Speedwell Bar				56°27′23″N 2°59′35″W	Category B	25529	Upload Photo
274 Clepington Road, King's Cross Hospital, Railings Gatepiers And Gate Only				56°28′41″N 2°59′11″W	Category B	25537	Upload Photo
49, 51, 53 South Tay Street				56°27′32″N 2°58′36″W	Category C(S)	25558	Upload Photo
Old Glamis Road And Claverhouse Road, Mains Parish Church (Of Scotland) And Churchyard				56°29′29″N 2°58′18″W	Category B	25440	Upload Photo
3 Magdalen Place				56°27′14″N 2°59′12″W	Category C(S)	25456	Upload Photo
158 Nethergate, Nethergate House, Including Boundary Walls And Railings				56°27′26″N 2°58′31″W	Category A	25458	Upload Photo
4 Magdalen Place				56°27′14″N 2°59′14″W	Category C(S)	25465	Upload Photo
127 South Road Lochee, Lochee Cabinet Factory, Formerly Balgay Linen Works				56°28′19″N 3°00′59″W	Category B	25482	Upload Photo
Strathmartine Road And Mains Road Hilltown Or Barrie's Clock				56°28′17″N 2°58′33″W	Category C(S)	25488	Upload Photo
150 Strathmartine Road, Coldside Branch Public Library, Including Railings				56°28′29″N 2°58′51″W	Category A	25494	Upload another image See more images
24 Milnbank Road With Railings				56°27′43″N 2°59′31″W	Category B	25508	Upload Photo
Panmure Street, Trinity Hall, High School of Dundee, Formerly Panmure Street Congregational Church, Including Railings				56°27′47″N 2°58′19″W	Category B	25513	Upload another image
3 Norwood Crescent, Ballochmyle, With Boundary Wall				56°27′33″N 3°00′52″W	Category B	25514	Upload Photo
41 High Street, Lochee St Mary's Rc Church Hall, Gray's Lane				56°28′16″N 3°00′28″W	Category C(S)	25342	Upload Photo
Meadowside, Meadow Place, Bell Street, Victoria Road, Meadow Place Buildings				56°27′51″N 2°58′17″W	Category B	25346	Upload Photo
5 Arnhall Drive Dounans, Including Gates And Boundary Walls				56°27′26″N 3°01′12″W	Category B	25352	Upload Photo
2 Kinghorne Road, 288, 290 Hilltown				56°28′13″N 2°58′34″W	Category B	25377	Upload Photo
Nethergate, City Churches, St Mary's East, Or Dundee Parish Church				56°27′34″N 2°58′20″W	Category A	25382	Upload another image
3 Glamis Road, Duncraig, With Boundary Walls				56°27′30″N 3°01′18″W	Category B	25419	Upload Photo
Lawton Road, Rockwell Primary And High Schools, Janitors Houses, Railings And Gates				56°28′27″N 2°59′14″W	Category B	25420	Upload Photo
22 Exchange Street				56°27′39″N 2°58′02″W	Category B	25207	Upload Photo
10 Dudhope Street, Craigbank, With Boundary Walls And Gatepiers				56°27′54″N 2°58′31″W	Category B	25218	Upload Photo
Crescent Street, And Return To Brown Constable Street Wallacetown Nursery School, Gatepiers And Railings Only				56°28′02″N 2°57′39″W	Category C(S)	25221	Upload Photo
12 Dudhope Street With Boundary Walls And Gatepiers				56°27′54″N 2°58′30″W	Category C(S)	25222	Upload Photo
77-80 (Inclusive Nos) High Street And Returns To Murraygate/Commercial Street				56°27′42″N 2°58′10″W	Category A	25247	Upload Photo

== Key ==
The scheme for classifying buildings in Scotland is:

- Category A: "buildings of national or international importance, either architectural or historic; or fine, little-altered examples of some particular period, style or building type."
- Category B: "buildings of regional or more than local importance; or major examples of some particular period, style or building type, which may have been altered."
- Category C: "buildings of local importance; lesser examples of any period, style, or building type, as originally constructed or moderately altered; and simple traditional buildings which group well with other listed buildings."

In March 2016 there were 47,288 listed buildings in Scotland. Of these, 8% were Category A, and 50% were Category B, with the remaining 42% being Category C.

== See also ==
- List of listed buildings in Dundee
