= Caird Hall =

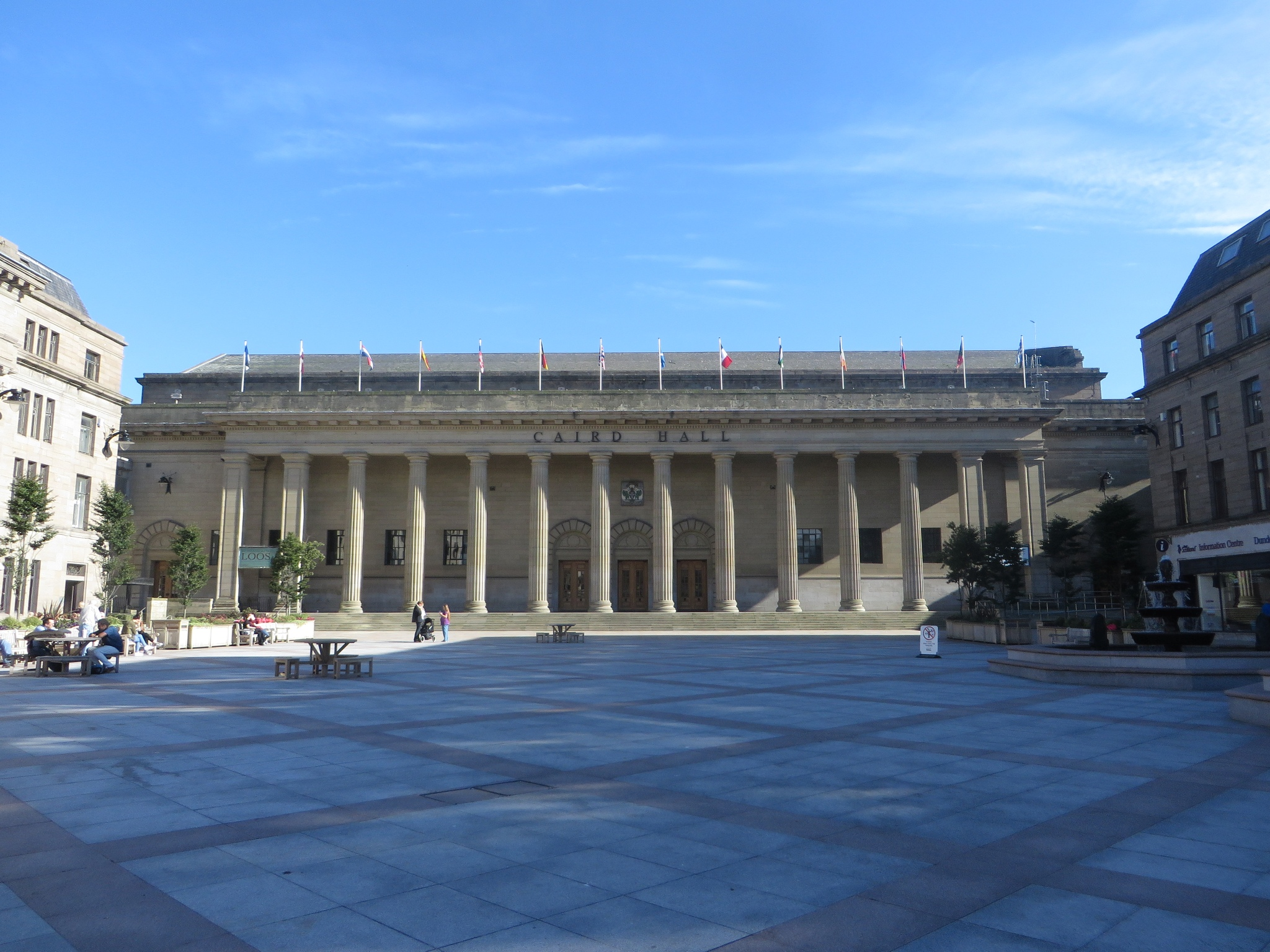
- Caird Hall facade from the City Square
- Interactive map of the Caird Hall area

General information
- Type: Concert hall
- Location: City Square; Dundee, Scotland
- Coordinates: 56.4599°N 2.9687°W
- Construction started: 1914
- Completed: 1923
- Inaugurated: 26 October 1923; 102 years ago
- Renovated: 1992
- Owner: Leisure and Culture Dundee

Height
- Height: 135 feet (41 m)

Design and construction
- Architect: James Thomson

Other information
- Seating capacity: 2,300

Website
- http://www.cairdhall.co.uk

Listed Building – Category A
- Official name: 11-13 (Inclusive Nos) City Square, 20-24 (Even Nos) Crichton Street, 1-7 (Inclusive Nos) Shore Terrace and Return to 35 Castle Street, Caird Hall
- Designated: 15 August 1979
- Reference no.: LB25258

The Caird Hall is a concert auditorium located in Dundee, Scotland. It is a Category A listed building.

== History ==
The site currently occupied by the building was occupied by a series of closes and tenements. The foundation stone for the building was laid by King George V and Queen Mary on 10 July 1914. It was designed by the town architect James Thomson, assisted by Vernon Constable, while the decorative plaster work was produced by H. H. Martyn & Company of Cheltenham, Gloucestershire, holders of the royal warrant. The building, which was named after its benefactor, the jute baron, Sir James Caird, was officially opened by the Prince of Wales on 26 October 1923. The hall's pipe organ was built in 1923 by Harrison & Harrison, who also completed a restoration in 1992.

=== 20th century ===
Throughout the 20th century, the Caird Hall hosted an impressive array of concerts that cemented its place in Scotland's live music scene. One of the Caird Hall's most notable performances came from The Beatles who performed at the venue in 1963 and 1964. The Beatles' 1963 concert in Dundee at the Caird Hall was where the term "Beatlemania" was coined by promotor Andi Lothian.

Throughout the 1970s, Deep Purple, David Bowie, Led Zeppelin, Elton John, Iron Maiden, The Who, Queen, The Clash and AC/DC were some of the notable acts that performed at the hall.

The 1980s saw Ozzy Osbourne, Thin Lizzy, UB40, Duran Duran, Simple Minds and U2 all perform at the Caird Hall, whilst Morrissey, The Stranglers, Bjork, Radiohead and Travis took to the stage in the 1990s.

=== 21st century ===
Acts who have performed at the Caird Hall throughout the 21st century include Bryan Adams, Kasabian, Stereophonics, Royal Blood, as well as home acts such as The View and DJ Hannah Laing who performed sell out shows in 2023.

During the COVID-19 pandemic, the Caird Hall was used as mass vaccination centre operated by NHS Tayside. It opened on 2 February 2021 and closed on 20 September 2021, completing 135,000 vaccinations.

The Hall celebrated the 100th anniversary of its opening in October 2023 with an exhibition celebrating its history.

In June 2025, it was announced that the Caird Hall would be the host venue for the Scottish Album of the Year Award from 2025 up until 2027.

== Annual events ==
The venue has a capacity of 2,300 fully seated, but can be subdivided or converted to standing where required. The hall is used for graduation ceremonies from the University of Dundee, the University of Abertay Dundee and Dundee and Angus College, as well as other significant university events. The Royal Scottish National Orchestra opened its 2019/20 season at the Caird Hall in October 2019.

On 23 June 2025, the Scottish Music Industry Association announced that Caird Hall would host the Scottish Album of the Year Award ceremony for 2025–2027.

== In popular culture ==
The exterior of Caird Hall was used as a location during the filming of the Alan Bennett scripted An Englishman Abroad in 1983. It was decorated with placards of communist leaders, to take the part of a theatre in Moscow.
