= List of listed buildings in Dundee =

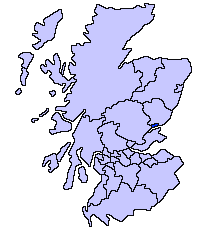
Dundee shown within Scotland

This is a list of listed buildings in Dundee. The list is split out by parish.

- List of listed buildings in Dundee/1
- List of listed buildings in Dundee/2
- List of listed buildings in Dundee/3
- List of listed buildings in Dundee/4
- List of listed buildings in Dundee/5
- List of listed buildings in Dundee/6
- List of listed buildings in Liff And Benvie, Dundee
- List of listed buildings in Longforgan, Dundee
- List of listed buildings in Murroes, Dundee

== See also ==
- Scheduled monuments in Dundee
