= River Leven Suspension Bridge =

Bridge in Fife, Scotland

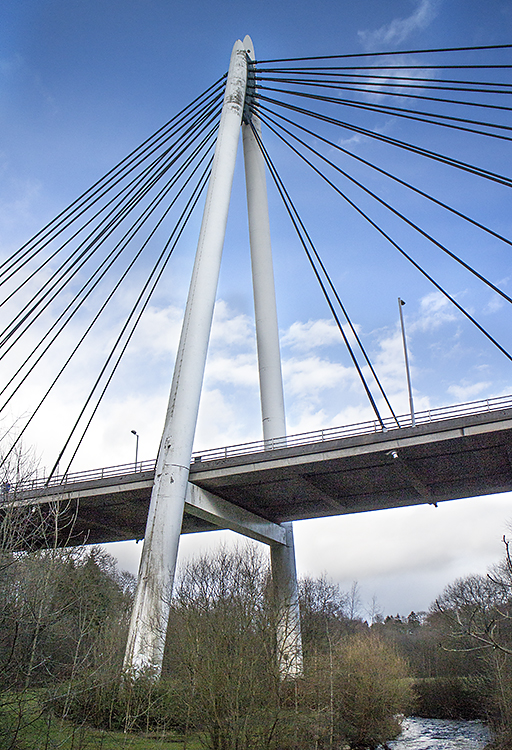
- A view of the bridge from Riverside Park
- Coordinates: 56.20144°N 3.1923°W
- Carries: B969
- Crosses: River Leven
- Locale: Fife
- Other name: The White Bridge
- Preceded by: Lady's Bridge
- Followed by: Cow Bridge

Characteristics
- Design: Suspension

History
- Designer: Nicoll Russell Studios
- Opened: 1995

Location
- Interactive map of River Leven Suspension Bridge

The River Leven Suspension Bridge, better know locally as The White Bridge, is a suspension bridge in Glenrothes that carries the B969 distributor road over the River Leven and the Riverside Park. The bridge was designed by Nicoll Russell Studios and was opened in 1995.

== See also ==
- List of bridges in Scotland
