= Howden House, West Lothian =

House in West Lothian, Scotland

Coordinates: 55°53′33.44″N 3°30′59.81″W

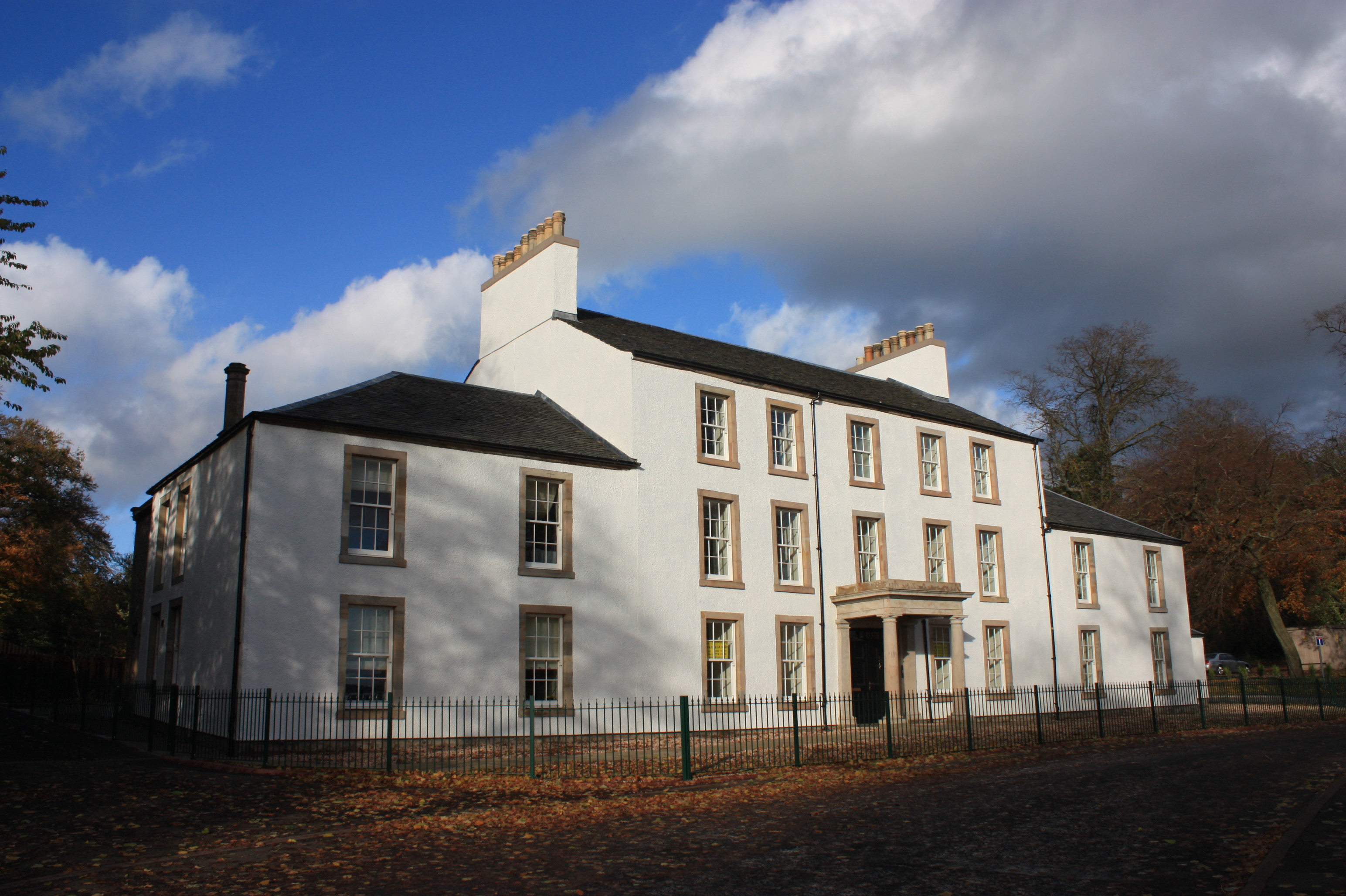
Howden House

Howden House is a late 18th-century house in the Howden area of Livingston, West Lothian, Scotland.

== History ==
The estate on which the house stands belonged to the Douglas family of Pumpherston. It was recorded as far back as the 16th century, when it was known as Over Howden.

It was built probably for Thomas Farquharson of Howden, and was completed in 1795. In 1834 it passed to Henry Raeburn, son of the Edinburgh portrait painter Sir Henry Raeburn. The daughter of the chemist James Young lived in the house until her death in 1931, when it was sold to Sir Adrian Baillie of Polkemmet, who bought it for his mother, Lady Baillie.

Just after midnight on Tuesday 25 June 1940 a bomb fell on the coach house and stables, killing Mrs Maria Fleming and her granddaughter Margaret, aged 10. These were the first civilians to be killed on the Scottish mainland and West Lothian's only deaths by bombing in World War II.

Lady Baillie lived at Howden until her death in 1946, when it was bought by the Ministry of Agriculture, who used the estate to test agricultural machinery.

Livingston, one of Scotland's post-war new towns, was developed around the estate in the 1960s, with the grounds to the south of the house remaining open as a park. The house was bought by Livingston Development Corporation for use as a community centre, supported by the Carnegie United Kingdom Trust. After two decades of neglect the building was sold by West Lothian council to a private developer, who converted the building into 1 large townhouse and 4 small flats during 2012/2013. Howden House is a category B listed building.

== Howden Park Centre ==
The former stable block of the house was converted into an arts centre, which was first opened as Howden Park Centre in 1972, by actor Andrew Cruickshank. In 2009, the centre was extensively refurbished by architects Nicoll Russell Studios.
