= George Angus (architect) =

Scottish architect (1792–1845)

George Angus ARSA (1792–1845) was an early 19th century Scottish architect renowned for his Gothic Revival churches and Classical public buildings. Although based in Edinburgh (and presumably seeking commissions there) almost all of his work is to the north, with a particular impact on the townscape of Dundee.

== Life ==
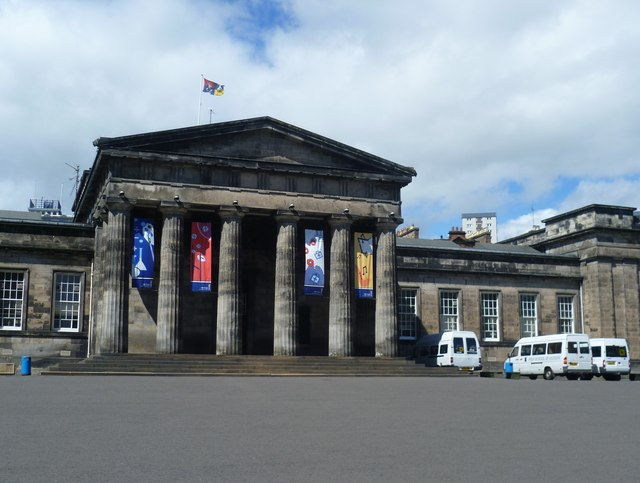
The High School of Dundee

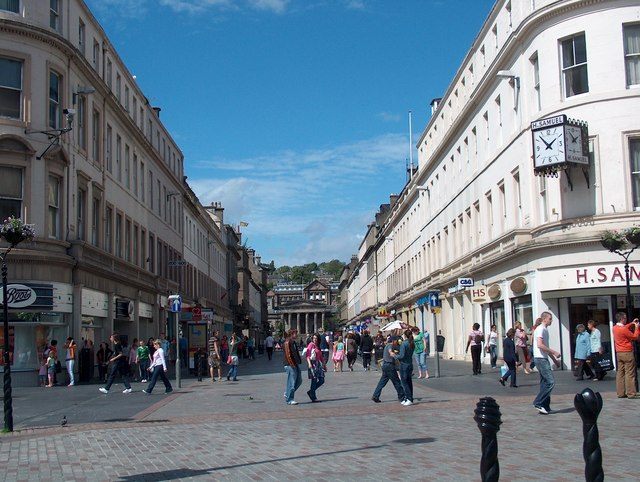
Reform Street, Dundee

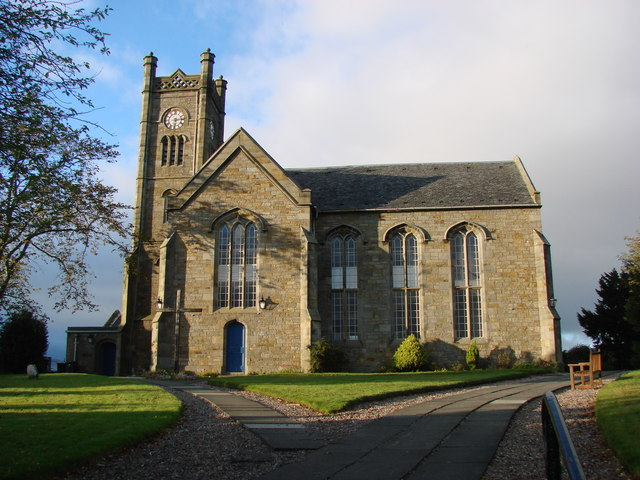
Kinross Parish Church

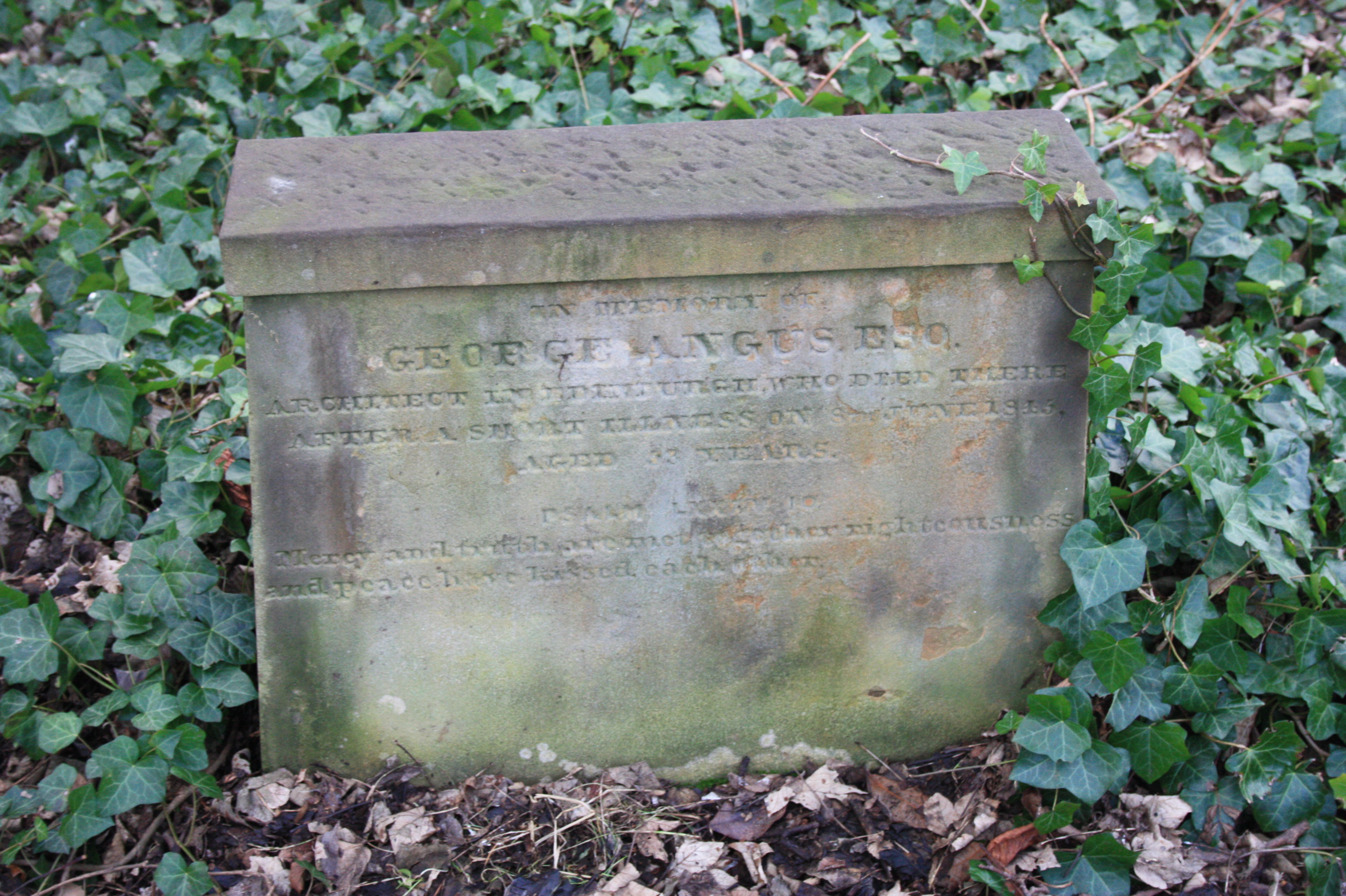
The grave of George Angus, Warriston Cemetery, Edinburgh

He was born in Meikleour in Perthshire in 1792. He had no university training but was apprenticed as an architect probably around 1802, probably in Dundee, given his later connections to the town.

He moved to 1 St Colme Street in Edinburgh in 1828 running an office from 165 Rose Street.

Little is known of his private life, but he was a friend of the artist Alexander Fraser. Several of his churches are based on R & R Dickson's Kilconquhar church of 1821.

In his final year his business address moved to 110 Princes Street facing onto Edinburgh Castle.

He died at his home, 1 St Colme Street in Edinburgh's New Town on 8 June 1845, following a short illness. He is buried in Warriston Cemetery in north Edinburgh. The extremely modest grave lies on the southmost path of the main cemetery, towards the south-east.

== Family ==
He was married to Jessie Smith, but his wife died young (possibly in childbirth). They had one daughter, also Jessie, who lived at 47 India Place after her father's death.

== Principal works ==
- Drummuir Parish Church (1816)
- Cottage at Christian Bank (now Trinity Road) Trinity, Edinburgh (1827)
- Internal restoration of Kirkcaldy Parish Church (1828)
- Contin manse remodelling (1829)
- High School of Dundee, known as Dundee Public Seminaries when built (1831)
- Reform Street, Dundee (1832)
- Kettle Parish Church, Kingskettle in Fife (1832)
- Kinross Parish Church (1832)
- Tulliallan Castle lodge (1832)
- Dundee Sheriff Court (1833)
- Hamilton Prison (1833)
- Tulliallan Parish Church (1833)
- Alloa House (1834)
- Watt Institution, Dundee (1834)
- Netherbyres House, Ayton (1834)
- British Linen Bank, Kinross (1835)
- Dudhope Church, Dundee (1837)
- Alloa Episcopal Church (1839)
- British Linen Bank, Kirriemuir (1839)
- Glendelvine House, Perthshire (1839)
- Dudhope Terrace, Dundee (1840)
- British Linen Bank, Tain (1845)
