= Dundee Sheriff Court =

Judicial building in Dundee, Scotland

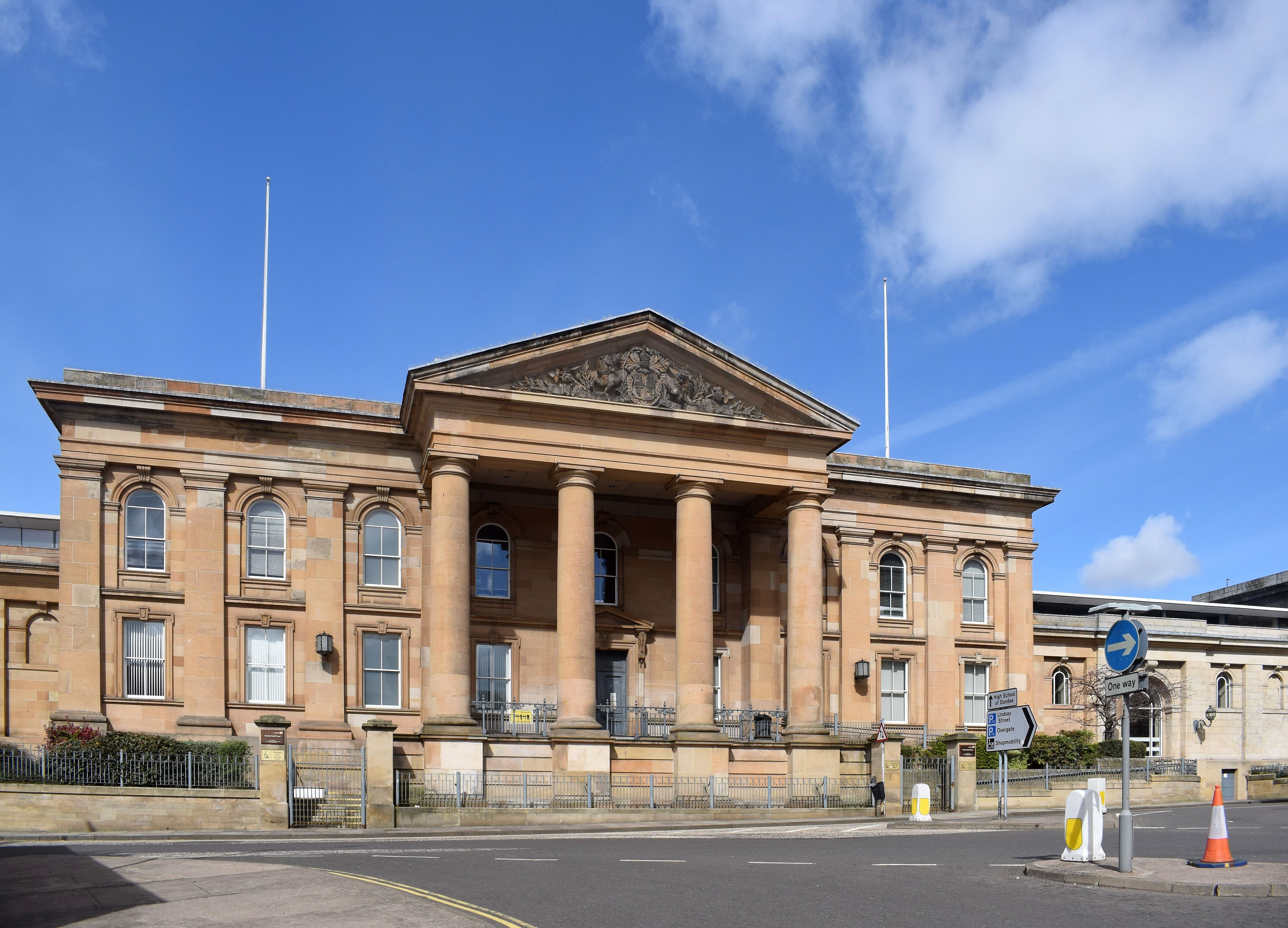
- The building in 2022

- Shown in Dundee
- 56.4622°N 2.9778°W
- Location: West Bell Street, Dundee

History
- Built: 1863

Site notes
- Architect: George Angus
- Architectural style: Neoclassical style

Listed Building – Category B
- Official name: Dundee Sheriff Court including former screen wall and pavilion block to east and boundary wall, and excluding 1979 Justice Of The Peace Court and 1993-96 additions and alterations, 6 West Bell Street, Dundee
- Designated: 4 February 1965
- Reference no.: LB25631

Dundee Sheriff Court is a judicial building on West Bell Street in Dundee in Scotland. The building, which operates as the main courthouse for the area, is a Category B listed building.

== History ==
The first judicial building in Dundee was the old town house in the High Street which had been designed by William Adam in the neoclassical style and completed in 1734. The design of the town house involved a symmetrical main frontage of seven bays facing onto the High Street. The central section of three bays was slightly projected forward and was pedimented and there was a central clock tower with a spire behind the pediment. The sheriff court was at the east end of the building.

In the early 1830s, court officials decided that they needed a dedicated courthouse: the site they selected was on the south side of West Bell Street. Although the architect, George Angus, completed all the design work in the 1830s, due to lack of finance, only the east pavilion, intended to accommodate a police station, and a prison at the rear of the site, were erected at that time.

In the early 1860s, construction resumed, using the original plans prepared by Angus, under the supervision of the town architect, William Scott. The main courthouse was designed in the neoclassical style, built in ashlar stone and was completed in October 1863. The design involved a symmetrical main frontage of nine bays facing onto West Bell Street. The central section of three bays featured a two-storey tetrastyle portico formed by four Doric order columns supporting an entablature and a pediment, with the Royal coat of arms in the tympanum. The wings of three bays each were fenestrated with square headed sash windows with architraves and keystones on the ground floor and with round headed windows with architraves and keystones on the first floor. Internally, the principal room was the main courtroom, which featured a coffered ceiling with ornate plasterwork.

A prison at the rear of the site, which had been erected along with the east pavilion in 1833, was demolished in 1927. A new police headquarters was erected on that site in the mid-1970s. A west pavilion, which had been erected along with the main courthouse in 1863, was demolished in 1974. An extensive programme of refurbishment works, carried out at a cost of £3.7 million to a design by Nicoll Russell Studios, was completed in 1996. The building was then officially re-opened by the Princess Royal in April 1997.

== See also ==
- List of listed buildings in Dundee/3
