= Howden, Livingston =

Area of Livingston, West Lothian, Scotland

Howden: Scottish Gaelic: Hòbhdan
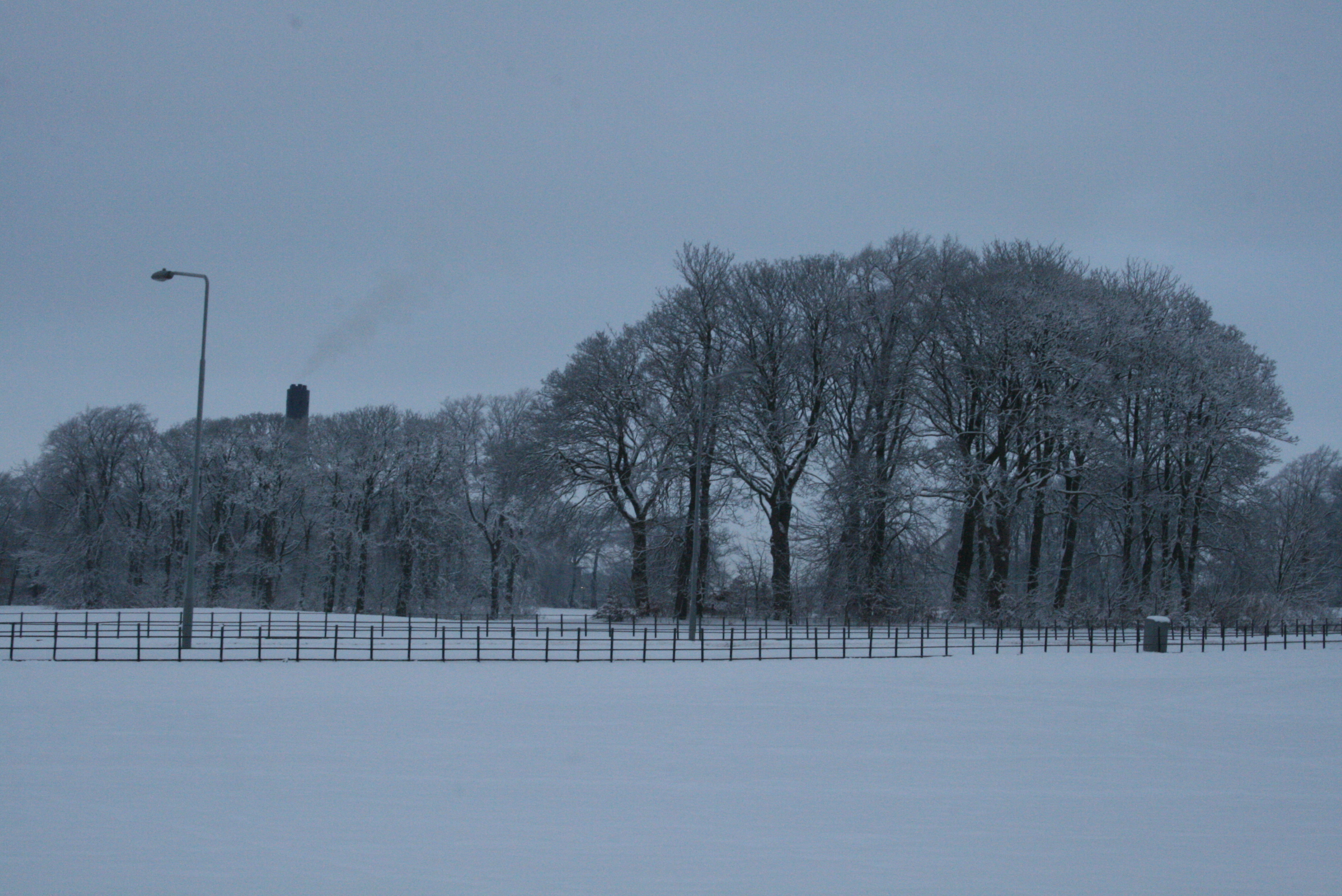
- Snow covered Howden Park
- Council area: West Lothian
- Lieutenancy area: West Lothian
- Country: Scotland
- Sovereign state: United Kingdom
- Post town: LIVINGSTON
- Dialling code: 01506
- Police: Scotland
- Fire: Scottish
- Ambulance: Scottish
- UK Parliament: Livingston
- Scottish Parliament: Almond Valley; Lothian

Howden (/ˈhaʊdən/) is an area of the new town of Livingston, the largest town in West Lothian, Scotland. Howden is bordered by Craigshill (to the east), Ladywell (to the north), Almondvale (to the south) and Kirkton (to the west).

It is notable for its large public park, and the theatre which is in it.

== History ==
The area takes its name after Howden House, a former historic country house dating back to the 1770s (it was previously known as Over Howden). The house passed from private ownership to then being used as Department of Agriculture testing station in the early 20th century until 1962, when it was then renovated in 1964 using a £64,000 donation from the Carnegie UK Trust, subsequently becoming Livingston's first community centre and the site for the early the board meetings of the Livingston Development Corporation. The house then fell to dereliction in the late 20th century but was restored and converted into 4 small flats and 1 large townhouse during 2012/2013. The adjacent stable block had previously been converted into Howden Park Centre, an arts and entertainment venue adjoining Howden park, a large open green space. The Howden area was developed as part of the initial developments of the new town plan in the late 1960s and early 1970s.

St John's Hospital, the main hospital serving Livingston and West Lothian, is located on the west edge of Howden.

== Education ==
Howden has two primary schools. Toronto Primary School is a non-denominational school which opened in 1971 and was recently extended with a new £2.5 million building in concrete and Vitreous enamel. Howden St Andrew's R C Primary School is a Roman Catholic primary school.

== Transport ==
The A899 road runs along the eastern edge of Howden and the A705 road runs along the northern edge of the district.

Lothian Country operates the bus service serving the area:

- 72 - Fauldhouse - Whitburn - Livingston - Broxburn - Winchburgh - Kirkliston (Lothian Country).
