= LiveHouse Dundee =

Multi-purpose live entertainment venue in Dundee, Scotland

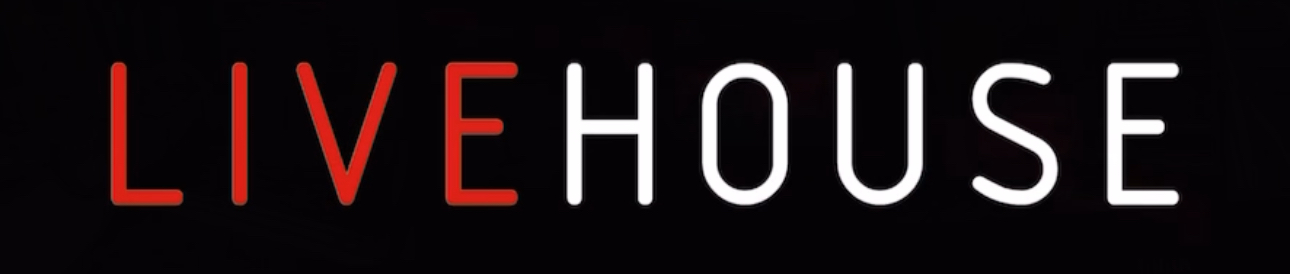

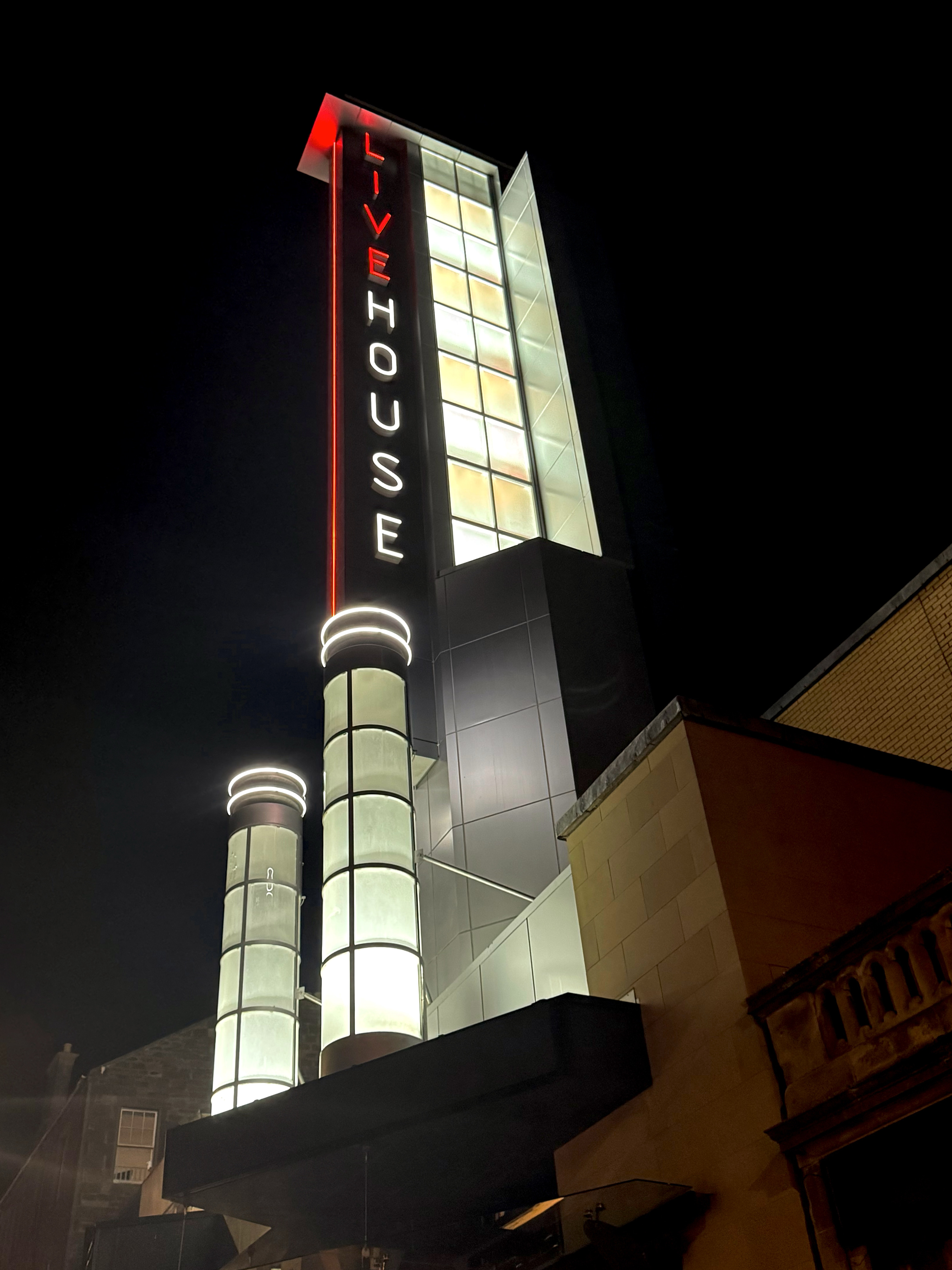
- LiveHouse Dundee façade on the Nethergate
- Interactive map of LiveHouse Dundee
- Address: 106–110 Nethergate
- Location: Dundee, Scotland
- Coordinates: 56.458688°N 2.972916°W
- Owner: TDI Arena Dundee
- Operator: 22A Events
- Capacity: 2,150 (phase one); 3,500 (phase two); 4,500 (phase three)
- Type: Multi-purpose
- Public transit: Dundee railway station

Construction
- Built: 1936 (tower); 1997 (current iteration)
- Opened: 2 May 2025
- Renovated: 2024–2025
- Rebuilt: 1997
- Architect: Nicoll Russell Studios

Website
- LiveHouse Dundee

LiveHouse Dundee (stylised as LIVEHOUSE Dundee) is a multi-purpose live entertainment venue in the Nethergate area of Dundee, Scotland. The venue is planned to have a maximum capacity of around 4,500 people, with mixed seating and standing configurations. It opened from 2 May 2025 with further work on the site expected to continue as the year progresses. Once reaching the 4,500 capacity, it will replace the Caird Hall as the largest entertainment venue in Dundee, and it is currently the third-largest indoor entertainment venue in Scotland behind Glasgow's OVO Hydro and Aberdeen's P&J Live, but will become the fourth with the opening of the Edinburgh Arena by 2028.

== History ==
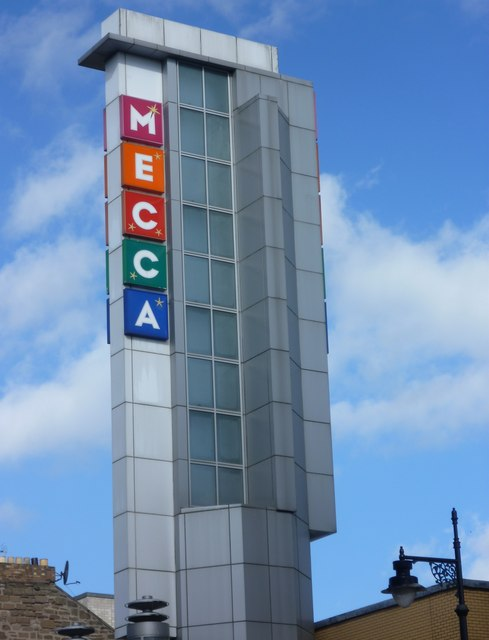
The advertising tower is the only component of the 1936 structure

Originally, the location was home to Green's Playhouse, a "super-cinema" that opened in 1936 with a seating capacity of 4,800. At the time, Green’s Playhouse was one of the largest cinemas in Europe, which had detailed Art Deco architecture and design, providing Dundee with a grand venue for film, theatre, and musical performances. The Playhouse's distinctive neon-lit facade and opulent interior drew in large crowds, making it a bustling hub of social life for decades.

However, as cinema attendance began to decline in the 1960s, Green's Playhouse closed as a cinema in January 1968. The site was repurposed the following year as a bingo hall, reflecting the shift in entertainment preferences among the local community. The venue continued to operate as a bingo hall for several decades under various owners, during which time it remained a meeting place for Dundee residents.

In 1995, the Playhouse site suffered a devastating fire that destroyed most of the historic structure. Despite the extensive damage, the advertising tower – a symbol of the Playhouse’s storied past – survived the blaze and has since become a landmark in its own right.

A year after the fire, Mecca Bingo took over the site in 1996, transforming it into a modern bingo venue while preserving the remaining tower. The bingo hall remained in operation for nearly three decades until February 2024, when Mecca Bingo closed.

=== Initial proposals ===
In 2022, proposals for a 10,000 capacity arena were announced, with plans to transform the Mecca Bingo site once the lease was up, with an expected opening date of 2027. Progress on the arena development stalled for a considerable amount of time. At the same time, another proposal for a 4,000 seat capacity esports arena was proposed at the Dundee waterfront however this was reduced to 1,000 seats.

=== Preparation and opening ===
In November 2024, it was announced that the site was to be reopened as LiveHouse Dundee which will be operated by MEC with an original opening on a phased basis from December 2024 initially at a capacity of 2,500 before extending to the planned 4,500 as works continue.

The opening date for LiveHouse Dundee was pushed back to 2025 following challenges in the operation.

In March 2025, it was revealed that the venue would open in May 2025 with the Dundee Dance Event closing party, after the organisers of the event posted a video of the venue on social media.

On 14 March 2025, signage on the 1930s tower was installed and neon lighting was added which was revealed on 21 March 2025. On 29 March 2025, it was announced that Craig Charles would be the first act to perform at LiveHouse, two days prior to the Dundee Dance Event.

=== Post-opening ===
Following its opening, LiveHouse Dundee confirmed a series of events across music, gaming and sport. Yungblud was among the first high-profile acts to be announced, though he later withdrew from the schedule.

In summer 2025, it was confirmed that the Kaiser Chiefs would perform at the venue in 2026, becoming one of the earliest large-scale concerts planned beyond the opening year.

The venue was also selected to host the ProtoPlay gaming festival in September 2025, an event which attracts developers and players from across the UK.

In addition, Ultra White Collar Boxing announced that it would stage an event at LiveHouse in November 2025, marking the venue’s entry into hosting sporting events.

In June 2026, LiveHouse Dundee was recommended to receive £15 million in funding through the Tay Cities Region Deal, subject to final approval by the Scottish and UK governments. The investment would fund enabling works at the venue, increasing its capacity to 3,500 and allowing it to host major concerts, touring productions and international conferences. The project is expected to attract up to 85,000 visitors annually, create around 150 jobs, leverage a further £6.5 million in investment, and support approximately 600 small and medium-sized businesses across the Tay Cities region.

== Events and amenities ==
LiveHouse Dundee aims to accommodate multi-purpose events, such as concerts and conferences with another primary focus being on esports competitions with the operators currently in discussion with an international gaming company.

It was announced in March 2025 that the venue would have separate event spaces, artist lounges and would have “robot bars” which would serve attendees without the need of waiters.

During the Dundee Dance Event, the car park at LiveHouse, which they dubbed the “Rave Cave”, was also used with the event featuring a surprise set by Hannah Laing.

=== Residence events ===
In April 2025, it was announced that Bongo's Bingo would take up residency at LiveHouse, moving from Duck Slatterly’s, with the first event held in July 2025.

Dundee Dance Event have hosted their closing parties at LiveHouse Dundee since 2025. During the events, the car park is transformed into the “Rave Cave”.

=== Singular events hosted ===
LiveHouse Dundee events
Date	Events
2025	Craig Charles; Martin Kemp; KIMMIC; ProtoPlay Festival 2025; Exhilaration x Khaotic; The Last Dinner Party; Country Club Dundee; Idlewild; Doves
2026	Mumford & Sons; Franz Ferdinand; Kaiser Chiefs; Yungblud; Snow Patrol; Primal Scream; Jamie Webster
