= List of listed buildings in Dundee/3 =

This is a list of listed buildings in Dundee, Scotland.

== List ==
Name	Location	Date Listed	Grid Ref. (Note: Sometimes known as OSGB36, the grid reference (where provided) is based on the British national grid reference system used by the Ordnance Survey. • "Guide to National Grid". Ordnance Survey. • "Get-a-map". Ordnance Survey.)	Geo-coordinates	Notes	LB Number (Note: Historic Environment Scotland assign a unique alphanumeric identifier to each designated site in Scotland, for listed buildings this always begins with "LB", for example "LB12345".)	Image
Barnhill, Strathmore Street, Barnhill Cemetery, Gilroy Mausoleum				56°28′35″N 2°51′25″W	Category B	25752	Upload Photo
Broughty Ferry, 11-13 Beach Crescent, Including Enclosing Wall				56°27′55″N 2°52′25″W	Category B	25759	Upload Photo
Broughty Ferry, 41-47 (Odd Nos) Beach Crescent, Beach House				56°27′54″N 2°52′22″W	Category B	25762	Upload Photo
389 Perth Road Ardshiel, Formerly The Hirsel, Including Boundary Walls				56°27′28″N 3°01′46″W	Category B	25579	Upload Photo
9, 11, 13 Ward Road, 1 Rattray Street, 4 Nicoll Street				56°27′43″N 2°58′31″W	Category B	25604	Upload Photo
414 Perth Road, Including Railings				56°27′23″N 3°00′04″W	Category C(S)	25607	Upload Photo
31 Ward Road, Strathmore Lodge, Salvation Army Hostel, Including Gatepiers And Boundary Wall				56°27′42″N 2°58′40″W	Category B	25608	Upload Photo
6 Ward Road Baptist Church				56°27′41″N 2°58′29″W	Category B	25614	Upload Photo
470 Perth Road Harris Academy, Including Janitor's House, Railing And Gatepiers Excluding Addition At West				56°27′22″N 3°00′32″W	Category B	25625	Upload Photo
6 West Bell Street, Sheriff Court Buildings, Including Boundary Walls And Railings				56°27′44″N 2°58′40″W	Category B	25631	Upload another image See more images
West Bell Street, War Memorial To Dundee City Police				56°27′43″N 2°58′42″W	Category C(S)	25633	Upload Photo
10-16 (Even Nos) Whitehall Crescent, Lampstandard				56°27′34″N 2°58′09″W	Category C(S)	25647	Upload Photo
15 Roseangle And Mcvicar's Lane, Johnfield				56°27′21″N 2°59′00″W	Category B	25652	Upload Photo
26-42 (Even Nos) Whitehall Crescent, 1-8 (Inclusive Nos) Dock Street Tay Hotel				56°27′32″N 2°58′10″W	Category B	25653	Upload another image
41 Roseangle (Front Block Only) With Boundary Walls				56°27′14″N 2°59′10″W	Category C(S)	25658	Upload Photo
14-24 (Even Nos) Whitehall Street				56°27′35″N 2°58′12″W	Category B	25667	Upload Photo
21 Perth Road (Dundee University) Former Hermonhill House				56°27′24″N 2°59′04″W	Category B	25526	Upload Photo
31 South Tay Street				56°27′30″N 2°58′34″W	Category B	25548	Upload Photo
299 Perth Road And 2 Rockfield Street, East Rockfield, With Boundary Walls And Gatepiers				56°27′25″N 3°00′17″W	Category C(S)	25551	Upload Photo
319 Perth Road, West Park Hall, Lodge, Boundary Walls And Gatepiers				56°27′26″N 3°00′37″W	Category B	25561	Upload Photo
6, 8, 10 South Tay Street, 1 Tay Square				56°27′28″N 2°58′33″W	Category B	25562	Upload Photo
327 Perth Road Ardmere, House And Lodge, Boundary Walls And Gatepiers				56°27′24″N 3°00′44″W	Category B	25565	Upload Photo
15-29 (Odd Nos) Tay Street Lane				56°27′31″N 2°58′33″W	Category C(S)	25572	Upload Photo
289-297 (Odd Nos) Hawkhill "Gowrie Place" Including Gatepiers, Garden Walls And Railings				56°27′24″N 2°59′41″W	Category B	25435	Upload Photo
Methven Street, Lochee Old Parish Church And Hall (Formerly St Ninian's Church Of Scotland)				56°28′24″N 3°00′35″W	Category B	25436	Upload Photo
8 Panmure Terrace, With Boundary Walls And Gatepiers				56°28′01″N 2°59′01″W	Category B	25454	Upload Photo
9 St Mary's Lane, St Mary's Primary School, With Boundary Walls And Railings				56°28′17″N 3°00′29″W	Category B	25466	Upload Photo
Salem Street, Salem Chapel, Church Of Christ				56°27′51″N 2°58′32″W	Category C(S)	25470	Upload Photo
53 Magdalen Yard Road And 50 Thomson Street				56°27′12″N 2°59′20″W	Category B	25472	Upload Photo
170 Nethergate, Spring Grove Cottage, Including Boundary Walls And Railings				56°27′24″N 2°58′39″W	Category B	25474	Upload Photo
6 Nicoll Street, 3 Rattray Street, Dundee Institute Of Technology Annexe, Formerly Foresters' Halls				56°27′43″N 2°58′31″W	Category B	25480	Upload Photo
15 Springhill				56°28′07″N 2°57′00″W	Category B	25485	Upload Photo
11-19 (Odd Nos) Panmure Street				56°27′47″N 2°58′10″W	Category B	25492	Upload Photo
21-25 (Odd Nos) Panmure Street				56°27′47″N 2°58′09″W	Category C(S)	25495	Upload Photo
8 Panmure Street				56°27′48″N 2°58′11″W	Category C(S)	25501	Upload Photo
15-20 (Inclusive) Trottick Mains				56°29′31″N 2°58′14″W	Category C(S)	25503	Upload Photo
32 Milnbank Road With Railings And Boundary Walls				56°27′43″N 2°59′33″W	Category B	25511	Upload Photo
2 Norwood Crescent, Pine-Mount, With Thatched Summerhouse, Boundary Wall And Gatepiers				56°27′33″N 3°00′52″W	Category C(S)	25517	Upload Photo
St Salvador Street And Church Street, St Salvador's Episcopal Church And Hall				56°28′12″N 2°58′17″W	Category A	25314	Upload another image See more images
5-9 Meadowside Or Albert Square, Former Gaelic Free Church Or Albert Square Church				56°27′44″N 2°58′16″W	Category B	25316	Upload another image
95, 97 Seagate, Loyal Order Of Ancient Shepherds, Central Halls				56°27′46″N 2°58′01″W	Category B	25321	Upload Photo
51, 53 Meadowside				56°27′49″N 2°58′13″W	Category B	25335	Upload Photo
7-15 (Odd Nos) Murraygate				56°27′43″N 2°58′07″W	Category B	25350	Upload Photo
25-31 (Odd Nos) Murraygate				56°27′44″N 2°58′06″W	Category B	25354	Upload Photo
35-39 (Odd Nos) Murraygate, Bank Of Scotland, Including Railings And Lampstandards				56°27′45″N 2°58′05″W	Category B	25358	Upload Photo
1, 3, 5 Blackness Avenue And 299 Hawkhill With Boundary Walls And Gatepiers				56°27′25″N 2°59′44″W	Category B	25364	Upload Photo
Invergowrie Drive Invergowrie House				56°27′41″N 3°02′14″W	Category A	25369	Upload Photo
Kinghorne Road, The High Kirk Including Railings				56°28′11″N 2°59′01″W	Category B	25373	Upload another image
434, 436 Blackness Road, Balcairn With Stables, Boundary Walls And Gatepiers				56°27′32″N 3°01′13″W	Category C(S)	25396	Upload Photo
123-131 (Odd Nos) Nethergate				56°27′27″N 2°58′32″W	Category B	25398	Upload Photo
23 Farington Street, Tillyloss With Boundary Walls And Railings				56°27′30″N 3°01′02″W	Category C(S)	25412	Upload Photo
Law Road Water Tower				56°28′14″N 2°59′00″W	Category B	25413	Upload another image
30 Farington Street, Moraig With Boundary Walls And Gatepiers				56°27′31″N 3°01′04″W	Category C(S)	25416	Upload Photo
Longtown Road, St Ninian's Episcopal Church				56°28′39″N 2°55′53″W	Category C(S)	25424	Upload Photo
Cowgate, Cowgait Port Or Wishart Arch				56°27′54″N 2°57′51″W	Category A	25209	Upload another image
Eadie's Road, Forebank House				56°27′59″N 2°58′13″W	Category B	25228	Upload Photo
24 Forebank Road Including Garden Walls				56°28′00″N 2°58′12″W	Category C(S)	25241	Upload Photo
61 King Street, Wishart Centre Former Wishart Memorial Church Including Railings				56°27′54″N 2°57′53″W	Category B	25275	Upload Photo
2 King Street, St Andrews Church, Including Graveyard, Gate-Piers, Railings And Gates. (Church Of Scotland)				56°27′53″N 2°58′05″W	Category A	25279	Upload Photo
Off Perth Road, Geddes Quadrangle, Harris Building, University Of Dundee				56°27′27″N 2°58′50″W	Category B	25281	Upload Photo
4 King Street, Former Kail Kirk Or Glasite Church, Now Hall Of St Andrews Church				56°27′52″N 2°58′03″W	Category B	25283	Upload Photo
3, 5 Forfar Road				56°28′32″N 2°57′15″W	Category C(S)	25292	Upload Photo
7 Forfar Road And 12 Madeira Street				56°28′32″N 2°57′15″W	Category C(S)	25295	Upload Photo
55, 55A, 59 And 61 Small's Wynd, Former Fleming Gymnasium, Boiler House And Jute Shed, University Of Dundee				56°27′27″N 2°58′47″W	Category B	25300	Upload Photo
24 Powrie Place				56°28′01″N 2°58′17″W	Category B	25302	Upload Photo
3-9 (Odd Nos) Crichton Street, Crichton Buildings				56°27′36″N 2°58′13″W	Category B	25124	Upload Photo
67 And 69 Clepington Road With Boundary Wall				56°28′40″N 2°57′17″W	Category C(S)	25133	Upload Photo
41-57 (Odd Nos) Albert Street, 2 Raglan Street				56°28′08″N 2°57′27″W	Category B	25160	Upload Photo
32, 33, 34 Dock Street				56°27′38″N 2°57′59″W	Category C(S)	25162	Upload Photo
110, 116 Albert Street, St John's Episcopal Church And Former Hall				56°28′14″N 2°57′28″W	Category B	25168	Upload Photo
12, 14 Constitution Terrace, And 72, 74 Constitution Street, With Boundary Walls And Garden Balustrade				56°28′01″N 2°58′40″W	Category C(S)	25169	Upload Photo
69 Dalkeith Road Former Manse Of Dundee, Now Auchinhove				56°28′22″N 2°56′52″W	Category B	25184	Upload Photo
5 Arthurstone Terrace, Arthurstone Public Library				56°28′10″N 2°57′32″W	Category B	25187	Upload another image
20-24 (Even Nos) Castle Street, Former St Paul's Episcopal Chapel				56°27′39″N 2°58′06″W	Category B	25024	Upload Photo
40, 42 Bingham Terrace				56°28′26″N 2°56′30″W	Category C(S)	25027	Upload Photo
44, 46 Bingham Terrace				56°28′26″N 2°56′28″W	Category C(S)	25032	Upload Photo
28-38 (Even Nos) Castle Street				56°27′38″N 2°58′05″W	Category B	25033	Upload Photo
3, 5, 7 Commercial Street, Including Travelling Crane And Hydraulic Lift				56°27′40″N 2°57′58″W	Category B	25046	Upload Photo
Methven Street, Camperdown Works, Arcade Fronting Boiler House				56°28′21″N 3°00′16″W	Category B	25061	Upload Photo
27-33 (Odd Nos) Commercial Street				56°27′41″N 2°58′02″W	Category B	25063	Upload Photo
73-99 (Odd Nos) Commercial Street/15, 17 Meadowside/2-10 (Even Nos) Murraygate				56°27′45″N 2°58′11″W	Category A	25075	Upload Photo
Camperdown House, Camperdown Country Park				56°29′04″N 3°02′34″W	Category A	25078	Upload another image See more images
Lochee, Stewart's Lane, Donald's Lane And Pitalpin Street, Pitalpin Works				56°28′30″N 3°01′29″W	Category B	25108	Upload Photo
Bright Street Boys Brigade Hall, Former Camperdown Works Half-Timer's School				56°28′26″N 3°00′35″W	Category B	24946	Upload Photo
46 Ancrum Road, Lochee Park Lodge And Gatepiers				56°28′06″N 3°00′40″W	Category B	24958	Upload Photo
27, 29, 31 Bank Street				56°27′39″N 2°58′23″W	Category B	24959	Upload Photo
25 Brown Street, Old Tay Works Mills, Engine Houses And Chimney				56°27′42″N 2°58′46″W	Category A	24960	Upload Photo
Baffin Street And Lilybank Rd Glebelands Primary School				56°28′06″N 2°57′12″W	Category B	24967	Upload Photo
Burnside Street, Former Camperdown Works Jute Warehouses 5, 6, 7, 8, 14, 15				56°28′16″N 3°00′17″W	Category B	24975	Upload Photo
Baxter Park, North Lodge Pitkerro Road				56°28′26″N 2°57′12″W	Category C(S)	24996	Upload Photo
7-21 (Odd Nos) Castle Street, Former Theatre Royal				56°27′38″N 2°58′07″W	Category B	25001	Upload Photo
9-17 (Odd Nos) Guthrie Street And Return Elevation To Blinshall Street, Former East Mill				56°27′40″N 2°58′51″W	Category B	25007	Upload Photo
Kemback Street And Return Elevation To Craigie Street, Wellfield Works (Buildings With Elevations To Kemback And Craigie Streets Only)				56°28′15″N 2°57′19″W	Category B	25018	Upload Photo
14-18 (Even Nos), Castle Street				56°27′39″N 2°58′06″W	Category C(S)	25020	Upload Photo
Camperdown Dock, Transit Shed 25, Or G Shed				56°27′48″N 2°57′22″W	Category B	24928	Upload Photo
Balgay Park, Mills Observatory				56°27′54″N 3°00′45″W	Category B	48924	Upload another image See more images
Perth Road, University Of Dundee, The Tower				56°27′26″N 2°58′41″W	Category B	51058	Upload another image
Mains Parish Wwi Black Watch Memorial, Caird Park				56°29′09″N 2°57′23″W	Category B	51412	Upload Photo
West Ferry, 20 Dundee Road, Taycliff, Including Gatepiers And Boundary Wall				56°28′08″N 2°53′56″W	Category C(S)	25926	Upload Photo
West Ferry, 64 Dundee Road				56°28′08″N 2°53′16″W	Category C(S)	25931	Upload Photo
West Ferry, 7 Ellieslea Road, Hazelwood, (Formerly Carmel Bank) Including Lamp Standard, Gatepiers And Boundary Walls				56°28′16″N 2°53′38″W	Category B	25934	Upload Photo
West Ferry, 11 Fairfield Road, Craigmore Lodge				56°28′13″N 2°54′02″W	Category C(S)	25937	Upload Photo
West Ferry, 10 Fairfield Road And 54 And 56 Strathern Road, Invergarry Including Gatepiers And Enclosing Wall At 58 Strathern Road				56°28′19″N 2°54′02″W	Category B	25942	Upload Photo
Broughty Ferry, 20-24 (Even Nos) Monifieth Road				56°28′03″N 2°52′03″W	Category C(S)	25860	Upload Photo
Broughty Ferry, Reres Road, Reres House, Including Coach House Block And Terraced Garden Walls				56°28′10″N 2°51′47″W	Category B	25876	Upload Photo
Broughty Ferry, 23 Seafield Road, Including Walls And Entrance Gate				56°28′17″N 2°52′42″W	Category B	25880	Upload Photo
Lammerton, Former Lammerton School				56°29′26″N 2°53′09″W	Category C(S)	25889	Upload Photo
Linlathen, Arbroath Road, Linlathen South Lodge, Including Wall, Gatepiers And Quadrants				56°28′48″N 2°52′41″W	Category B	25891	Upload Photo
Pitkerro, Pitkerro House, Former Coach House And Stable Court				56°29′33″N 2°53′22″W	Category C(S)	25896	Upload Photo
West Ferry, 47 Albany Road And 8 Ellieslea Road, Milton Bank, Including Wall And Gatepiers				56°28′19″N 2°53′36″W	Category B	25903	Upload Photo
West Ferry, 1 Albert Road, Aystree Lodge, Including Boundary Wall				56°28′14″N 2°53′12″W	Category B	25906	Upload Photo
West Ferry, 1 Belsize Road And 2 Strathern Road, Belsize House, Including Lamp Standard And Gatepiers				56°28′12″N 2°54′38″W	Category C(S)	25912	Upload Photo
West Ferry, 43 Craigie Drive, The Wyck, Including Wall And Gatepiers, Garage And Garden Shed				56°28′09″N 2°55′00″W	Category B	25915	Upload Photo
Broughty Ferry, 151 Brook Street, Ymca Mainblock				56°28′04″N 2°52′39″W	Category B	25766	Upload Photo
Broughty Ferry, 33 Camperdown Street, St Stephen's And West Manse, Including Wall And Gatepiers				56°28′11″N 2°52′36″W	Category B	25775	Upload Photo
Broughty Ferry, 61-73 (Odd Nos) Fisher Street				56°27′55″N 2°52′42″W	Category C(S)	25795	Upload Photo
Broughty Ferry, Fisher Street, Quay And Pier, Including Bollards, Lamp Standards And Moor Rings				56°27′53″N 2°52′31″W	Category B	25806	Upload Photo
Broughty Ferry, 5 Fort Street, St James Church And Hall, And Former Fishermen's Reading Room				56°27′56″N 2°52′39″W	Category C(S)	25807	Upload another image See more images
Broughty Ferry, 37-41 (Odd Nos) Fort Street And 146 King Street				56°27′57″N 2°52′37″W	Category B	25808	Upload Photo
Broughty Ferry, 6-8 (Even Nos) Fort Street				56°27′55″N 2°52′37″W	Category C(S)	25810	Upload Photo
Broughty Ferry, 50 Fort Street				56°27′59″N 2°52′35″W	Category C(S)	25816	Upload Photo
Broughty Ferry, 21-25 (Odd Nos) Forthill Road, Ayrebrayde, Including Stable And Coach House, Gatepiers, Gates And Boundary Wall				56°28′24″N 2°52′31″W	Category B	25817	Upload Photo
Broughty Ferry, 81 And 83 Gray Street				56°28′00″N 2°52′25″W	Category B	25821	Upload Photo
Broughty Ferry, The Harbour, Broughty Castle				56°27′47″N 2°52′13″W	Category A	25829	Upload Photo
Broughty Ferry, 17 King Street				56°28′01″N 2°52′52″W	Category C(S)	25843	Upload Photo
11 Westfield Place, Westfield Cottage				56°27′20″N 2°59′12″W	Category B	25683	Upload Photo
57 Magdalen Yard Road And 26,28 Paton's Lane With Boundary Walls And Gatepiers				56°27′13″N 2°59′24″W	Category B	25689	Upload Photo
Barnhill, Strathmore Street, Barnhill Cemetery Including Boundary Walls, Gates And Gatepiers				56°28′33″N 2°51′25″W	Category C(S)	25751	Upload Photo
Broughty Ferry, 1 Ambrose Street				56°27′54″N 2°52′32″W	Category C(S)	25753	Upload Photo
Broughty Ferry, 3 Ambrose Street				56°27′54″N 2°52′32″W	Category C(S)	25754	Upload Photo
Broughty Ferry, 9 Beach Crescent, Including Enclosing Wall				56°27′55″N 2°52′26″W	Category B	25758	Upload Photo
Broughty Ferry, Beach Crescent, 9 Lamp Standards				56°27′53″N 2°52′22″W	Category B	25764	Upload Photo
2-10 (Even Nos) Union Street, 40 Nethergate				56°27′34″N 2°58′16″W	Category B	25584	Upload Photo
18-38 (Even Nos) Perth Road				56°27′24″N 2°58′44″W	Category C(S)	25585	Upload Photo
40 Perth Road				56°27′24″N 2°58′47″W	Category B	25587	Upload Photo
14 Ward Road				56°27′41″N 2°58′32″W	Category B	25618	Upload Photo
488 Perth Road, Cidhmore House And Lodge				56°27′21″N 3°01′01″W	Category B	25632	Upload Photo
7 And 9 Whitehall Crescent				56°27′34″N 2°58′11″W	Category B	25637	Upload Photo
Riverside Drive, Vernonholme House, Garage, Lodge And Gatepiers				56°27′19″N 3°01′26″W	Category B	25646	Upload Photo
28 Whitehall Crescent, Lampstandard				56°27′32″N 2°58′12″W	Category C(S)	25655	Upload Photo
18, 20 Victoria Road Hilltown, And 47-51 (Odd Nos) Dudhope Street				56°27′53″N 2°58′16″W	Category B	25524	Upload Photo
34 Reform Street				56°27′41″N 2°58′16″W	Category B	25531	Upload Photo
259 Perth Road And Seymour Street, Seymour Lodge, Including Wall And Railings To Seymour Street, Excluding Additions At Rear				56°27′25″N 2°59′59″W	Category A	25542	Upload another image See more images
261 Perth Road Including Boundary Walls				56°27′25″N 3°00′00″W	Category C(S)	25545	Upload Photo
301 Perth Road Rockfield, With Boundary Walls And Gatepiers				56°27′25″N 3°00′18″W	Category C(S)	25553	Upload Photo
24-32 (Even Nos) South Tay Street				56°27′30″N 2°58′36″W	Category B	25566	Upload Photo
387 Perth Road Or 2 Hazel Avenue Morar, Including Boundary Walls				56°27′28″N 3°01′45″W	Category B	25577	Upload Photo
106 Nethergate, Mecca Playhouse Tower (Formerly Green's Playhouse)				56°27′31″N 2°58′23″W	Category B	25437	Upload Photo
112-116 (Even Nos) Nethergate, Meadowside St Paul's Church Of Scotland, Cornerstone Coffee House And Church Of Scotland Bookshop				56°27′30″N 2°58′22″W	Category B	25441	Upload Photo
150 Nethergate, St Andrew's Roman Catholic Cathedral, Including Presbytery And Former Sea Wall To South				56°27′27″N 2°58′29″W	Category B	25455	Upload Photo

== Key ==
The scheme for classifying buildings in Scotland is:

- Category A: "buildings of national or international importance, either architectural or historic; or fine, little-altered examples of some particular period, style or building type."
- Category B: "buildings of regional or more than local importance; or major examples of some particular period, style or building type, which may have been altered."
- Category C: "buildings of local importance; lesser examples of any period, style, or building type, as originally constructed or moderately altered; and simple traditional buildings which group well with other listed buildings."

In March 2016 there were 47,288 listed buildings in Scotland. Of these, 8% were Category A, and 50% were Category B, with the remaining 42% being Category C.

== See also ==
- List of listed buildings in Dundee
