= Nicoll Russell Studios =

Architecture firm in Dundee, Scotland

Nicoll Russell Studios Ltd
- Company type: Limited company
- Industry: Architecture, Design
- Headquarters: Dundee, Scotland, UK
- Website: www.nrsarchitects.com

Nicoll Russell Studios is an architecture practice based in Dundee, Scotland.

The firm was established in 1982 by Andrew Nicoll and Ric Russell as a result of the completion of Dundee Repertory Theatre.

The Dundee Repertory Theatre received the practice's first Royal Institute of British Architects (RIBA) Award. The practice has since won a number of awards including RIBA, National Civic Trust, Dynamic Place and Royal Incorporation of Architects in Scotland (RIAS) Awards.

== Projects ==
Year	Project	Location	Ref
1987	Market Place	Arbroath, Scotland	
1987	Grianan Building	Dundee, Scotland	
1989	TSB Bank	St Andrews, Scotland	
1993	Scrimgeour's Corner	Crieff, Scotland	
1994	Artists Studios, DJCAD	Dundee, Scotland	
1995	White Top Centre	Dundee, Scotland	
1998	Dundee Sheriff Court	Dundee, Scotland	
1999	Falkirk Wheel	Falkirk, Scotland	
2002	Byre Theatre	St Andrews, Scotland	
2002	The Space	Dundee, Scotland	
2003	Scottish Dance Theatre	Dundee, Scotland	
2005	An Lanntair	Stornoway, Scotland	
2008	The Steeple Arts Centre	Newburgh, Scotland	
2009	Howden Park Arts Centre	Livingston, Scotland	
2010	Briggait Artists' Studios Complex	Glasgow, Scotland	
2010	Hillcrest HQ	Dundee, Scotland	
2015	The Kelpies Visitor Centre	Falkirk, Scotland	
2018	Craigsfarm Community Hub	Livingston, Scotland	
2019	Water's Edge	Dundee, Scotland	
2020	St Andrews Music Centre	St Andrews, Scotland	
2024	LiveHouse Dundee	Dundee, Scotland	
